= List of photographers =

This is a list of notable photographers.

== Africa ==
=== Algeria ===
- Zohra Bensemra (born 1968)
- Sabrina Draoui (born 1977)
- Hocine Zaourar (born 1952)

=== Benin ===
- Joseph Agbodjelou (1912–1999)
- Leonce Raphael Agbodjelou (born 1965)
- Mayeul Akpovi (born 1979)

=== Cameroon ===
- Joseph Chila (born 1948)
- Angèle Etoundi Essamba (born 1962)
- Samuel Fosso (born 1962)
- Jacques Toussele (1939–2017)

=== Democratic Republic of the Congo ===
- Gosette Lubondo (born 1993)
- Joseph Makula (1929–2006)

=== Egypt ===
- Lara Baladi (born 1969)
- W. Hanselman
- Rana El Nemr (born 1974)
- Laura El-Tantawy (born 1980)
- Sherif Sonbol (1956–2023)
- Ayman Lotfy (born 1968)

=== Eritrea ===
- Senayt Samuel (born 1969)

=== Ethiopia ===
- Eyerusalem Jiregna (born 1993)
- Aïda Muluneh (born 1974)
- Michael Tsegaye (born 1975)

=== The Gambia ===
- Khadija Saye (1992–2017)

=== Ghana ===
- Edmund Abaka
- Felicia Abban (born 1935–2024)
- Campbell Addy (born c. 1993)
- Daniel Attoumou Amicchia (1908–1994)
- Philip Kwame Apagya (born 1958)
- Gilbert Asante (born 1987)
- James Barnor (born 1929)
- Eric Gyamfi (born 1990)
- Josephine Kuuire
- Bob Pixel (1976–2021)
- TwinsDntBeg (born 1989)

=== Kenya ===
- Mohamed Amin (1943–1996)
- Polly Irungu, photographer and journalist
- Osborne Macharia (born 1986)
- Boniface Mwangi (born 1983)
- Mimi Cherono Ng'ok (born 1983)
- Priya Ramrakha (1935–1968)

=== Mali ===
- Alioune Bâ (born 1959)
- Fatoumata Diabaté (born 1980)
- Seydou Keïta (1921–2001)
- Adama Kouyaté (1928–2020)
- Hamidou Maiga (born 1932)
- Malick Sidibé (1935–2016)

=== Namibia ===
- Margaret Courtney-Clarke (born 1949)
- Tony Figueira (1959–2017)

=== Nigeria ===
- Dayo Adedayo (born 1964)
- Jenevieve Aken (born 1989)
- Akintunde Akinleye (born 1971)
- Solomon Osagie Alonge (1911–1994)
- Kelechi Amadi-Obi (born 1969)
- Aisha Augie-Kuta (born 1980)
- Nora Awolowo (born 1999)
- George Da Costa (1853–1929)
- Andrew Esiebo (born 1978)
- Rotimi Fani-Kayode (1955–1989)
- Caleb Femi (born 1990)
- Tam Fiofori (1942–2024)
- Samuel Fosso (born 1962)
- Misan Harriman (born 1977)
- Neils Walwin Holm (1866–1927)
- Neec Nonso (born 1990)
- Ayodeji Awoyomi (born 1990)
- Simon Norfolk (born 1963)
- Amarachi Nwosu (born 1994)
- Uche Odoh (born 1989)
- J. D. 'Okhai Ojeikere (1930–2014)
- Emeka Okereke (born 1980)
- Bayo Omoboriowo (born 1987)
- Adetona Omokanye (born 1990)
- Anny Robert (born 1990)
- Herzekiah Andrew Shanu (1858–1905)
- Tidiani Shitou (1933–2000)
- James Iroha Uchechukwu (born 1972)
- Iké Udé (born 1964)
- David Uzochukwu (born 1998)

=== Sierra Leone ===
- Alphonso Lisk-Carew (1887–1969)

=== South Africa ===
- Omar Badsha (born 1945)
- Steve Bloom (born 1953)
- Steven Bosch (born 1978)
- Kevin Carter (1960–1994)
- James Chapman (1831–1872)
- Ernest Cole (1940–1990)
- Vera Elkan (1908–2008)
- Arthur Elliott (1870–1938)
- Abrie Fourie (born 1969)
- Caroline Gibello (born 1974)
- David Goldblatt (1930–2018)
- Bob Gosani (1934–1972)
- Anton Hammerl (1969–2011)
- Sam Haskins (1926–2009)
- Pieter Hugo (born 1976)
- Phumzile Khanyile (born 1991)
- Alf Kumalo (1930–2012)
- Carla Liesching (born 1985)
- Ambrose Lomax (1867–1943)
- David Lurie (born 1951)
- Peter Magubane (1932–2024)
- Michael Meyersfeld (born 1940)
- Eric Miller (born 1951)
- Nandipha Mntambo (born 1982)
- Santu Mofokeng (1956–2020)
- Billy Monk (1937–1982)
- Zwelethu Mthethwa (born 1960)
- Zanele Muholi (born 1972)
- Sam Nzima (1934–2018)
- Obie Oberholzer (born 1947)
- Henrik Purienne (born 1977)
- Andrzej Sawa (born 1941)
- Jürgen Schadeberg (1931–2020)
- Thabiso Sekgala (1981–2014)
- Lindokuhle Sobekwa (born 1995)
- Austin Stevens (born 1950)
- Mikhael Subotzky (born 1981)
- Guy Tillim (born 1962)
- Gisèle Wulfsohn (1957–2011)
- Paul Yule (born 1956)

=== Sudan ===
- Mohamed Nureldin Abdallah
- Ola Alsheikh
- Mohamed Altoum
- Salih Basheer (born 1995)
- Eythar Gubara (born 1988)
- Gadalla Gubara (1920–2008)
- Sara Gadalla Gubara (born 1956)
- Ala Kheir (born 1985)
- Rashid Mahdi (1923–2008)
- Hamza Yassin (born 1990)

=== Uganda ===
- Catherine Apalat (born 1981)
- Zarina Bhimji (born 1963)
- Sarah Waiswa

== Asia ==
=== Armenia ===
- Ida Kar (1908–1974)
- Ohannes Kurkdjian (1851–1903)
- Gabriel Lekegian (fl. 1870–1890)
- Jean Pascal Sébah (1872–1947)
- Pascal Sébah (1823–1886)
- Van Leo (1921–2002)
- Samvel Sevada (born 1949)

=== Azerbaijan ===
- Rena Effendi (born 1977)

=== Cambodia ===
- Dith Pran (1942–2008)

=== Georgia ===
- Irakly Shanidze (born 1968)

=== Hong Kong ===
- Basil Pao
- Ho Fan (1931–2016)

=== India ===
- Altaf Qadri (born 1976)
- Atul Kasbekar (born 1965)
- Balan Madhavan
- Benu Sen (1932–2011)
- Dabboo Ratnani (born 1971)
- Darogha Ubbas Alli (19th century)
- Dayanita Singh (born 1961)
- Dhaval Dhairyawan (1979–2012)
- Dimpy Bhalotia (born 1987)
- Gautam Rajadhyaksha (1950–2011)
- Jagdish Mali (1954–2013)
- Jayanth Sharma (born 1980)
- Kamran Yusuf (Kamran Yousuf, born 1994)
- Ketaki Sheth (born 1957)
- Lala Deen Dayal (1844–1905)
- Pablo Bartholomew (born 1955)
- Poulomi Basu (born 1983)
- Prabuddha Dasgupta (1956–2012)
- Raghu Rai (1942–2026)
- Rathika Ramasamy
- Sooni Taraporevala
- Sohrab Hura (born 1981)
- Subhankar Banerjee (born 1967)
- Sudhir Shivaram (born 1972)
- Sunil K. Dutt (born 1939)
- Sutapa Biswas (born 1962)
- Varun Aditya (born 1991)
- Vicky Roy (born 1987)
- Yatin Patel

=== Indonesia ===
- Kassian Cephas (1845–1912)

=== Iran ===
- Abbas (1944–2018)
- Hoda Afshar (born 1983)
- Reza Deghati (born 1952)
- Manoocher Deghati (born 1954)
- Kaveh Golestan (1950–2003)
- Mohammad Reza Domiri Ganji (born 1990)
- Bahman Jalali (1944–2010)
- Nasrollah Kasraian (born 1944)
- Mohammadreza Mirzaei (born 1986)
- Hossein Rajabian (born 1984)
- Mitra Tabrizian (born 1954)
- Newsha Tavakolian (born 1981)
- Jahangir Razmi (born 1947)
- Ali Khan Vali (1845–1902)
- Alfred Yaghobzadeh (born 1958)

=== Iraq ===
- Alaa Al-Marjani (born 1967)

=== Israel ===
- Micha Bar-Am (born 1930)
- Rafael Ben-Ari (born 1971)
- Michal Chelbin (born 1974)
- Nadav Kander (born 1961)
- Ziv Koren (born 1970)
- Alex Levac (born 1944)
- Roie Galitz (born 1980)

=== Japan ===
- Nobuyoshi Araki (born 1940)
- Masahisa Fukase (1934–2012)
- Rosō Fukuhara (1892–1946)
- Shinzō Fukuhara (1883–1948)
- Kansuke Yamamoto (1914–1987)
- Hiroshi Hamaya (1915/16–1999)
- Eikoh Hosoe (1933–2024)
- Kenro Izu (born 1949)
- Kikuji Kawada (born 1933)
- Rinko Kawauchi (born 1972)
- Ihei Kimura (1901–1974)
- Keizō Kitajima (born 1954)
- Ken Kitano (born 1968)
- Yasumasa Morimura (born 1951)
- Daidō Moriyama (born 1938)
- Yōnosuke Natori (1910–1962)
- Yasuzō Nojima (1889–1964)
- Tomoko Sawada (born 1977)
- Lieko Shiga (born 1980)
- Issei Suda (1940–2019)
- Hiroshi Sugimoto (born 1948)
- Kunié Sugiura (born 1942)
- Cozue Takagi (born 1985)
- Shōmei Tōmatsu (1930–2012)
- Hiroko Komatsu (born 1969)
- Ayano Sudo (born 1986)
- Osamu Shiihara (1905–1974)

=== Lebanon ===
- Nadim Asfar (born 1976)
- Gregory Buchakjian (born 1971)

=== Pakistan ===
- Tapu Javeri (born 1965)
- Adnan Kandhar (born 1986)
- Farah Mahbub (born 1965)
- Huma Mulji (born 1970)
- Zaigham Zaidi (1930–2006)

=== Palestine ===
- Karimeh Abbud (1893–1940)
- Asma Ghanem (born 1991)
- Motaz Azaiza (born 1999)
- Kegham Djeghalian (1915–1981)
- Rula Halawani (born 1964)
- Yousef Khanfar (born 1956)
- Steve Sabella (born 1975)
- Khalil Raad (1854–1957)

=== Singapore ===
- John Clang (born 1973)
- Sim Chi Yin (born 1978)
- Teo Bee Yen (born 1950)
- Marjorie Doggett (1921–2010)

=== Sri Lanka ===
- Lionel Wendt (1900–1944)

=== Syria ===
- Bengin Ahmad (born 1986)
- Fareed al-Madhhan (born 1969)

=== Taiwan ===
- Chien-Chi Chang (born 1961)
- Wang Hsin (born 1942)

=== Thailand ===
- Francis Chit (1830–1891)

=== Turkey ===
- Ömer Asan (born 1961)
- Bahaettin Rahmi Bediz (1875–1951)
- Sabiha Çimen (born 1986)
- Ara Güler (1928–2018)
- Mine Kasapoğlu (born 1979)
- Yıldız Moran (1932–1995)
- Pascal Sébah (1823–1886)
- Uğur Uluocak (1962–2003)

=== Vietnam ===
- Huynh Cong Ut, known professionally as Nick Ut (born 1951)

== Europe ==
=== Austria ===
- Manfred Baumann (born 1968)
- Lukas Beck (born 1967)
- Wilhelm J. Burger (1844–1920)
- David Uzochukwu (born 1998)
- Ernst Haas (1921–1986)
- Gottfried Helnwein (born 1948)
- Herbert Bayer (1900–1985)
- Josef Hoflehner (born 1955)
- Lisette Model (1901–1983)
- Inge Morath (1923–2002)
- Willy Puchner (born 1953)
- Baron Raimund von Stillfried (1839–1911)
- Stillfried & Andersen

=== Belgium ===
- Anthony Asael (born 1974)
- Jean-Marie Bottequin (born 1941)
- Bieke Depoorter (born 1986)
- Isidore Jacques Eggermont (1844–1923)
- Martine Franck (1938–2012)
- Harry Gruyaert (born 1941)
- Victor Guidalevitch (1892–1962)
- Carl De Keyzer (born 1958)
- Eugène Lemaire (1874–1948)
- Régine Mahaux (born 1967)
- Marcel Mariën (1920–1993)
- Filip Naudts (born 1968)
- Germaine Van Parys (1893–1983)
- Max Pinckers (born 1988)
- Bart Ramakers (born 1963)
- Herman Selleslags (1938-2024)
- Wim Tellier
- Herman van den Boom (born 1950)
- Stephan Vanfleteren (born 1969)

=== Croatia ===
- Tošo Dabac (1907–1970)
- Damir Hoyka (born 1967)
- Viktor Đerek (born 2000)

=== Czech Republic ===
- Karel Cudlín (born 1960)
- František Drtikol (1883–1961)
- Libuše Jarcovjáková (born 1952)
- Viktor Kolář (born 1941)
- Rudolf Koppitz (1884–1936)
- Josef Koudelka (born 1938)
- Antonín Kratochvíl (born 1947)
- Rudolf Franz Lehnert (1878–1948)
- Markéta Luskačová (born 1944)
- Frank Plicka (1926–2010)
- Karel Plicka (1894–1987)
- Jan Saudek (born 1935)
- Ignác Šechtl (1840–1911)
- Josef Jindřich Šechtl (1877–1954)
- Marie Šechtlová (1928–2008)
- Jindřich Štreit (born 1946)
- Josef Sudek (1896–1976)
- Miroslav Tichý (1926–2011)
- Josef Větrovský (1897–1944)

=== Denmark ===
- Mads Alstrup (1808–1876)
- Per Bak Jensen (born 1949)
- Reg Balch (1894–1994)
- Morten Bo (born 1945)
- Krass Clement (born 1946)
- Joakim Eskildsen (born 1971)
- Frederikke Federspiel (1839–1913)
- Kristen Feilberg (1839–1919)
- Jens Fink-Jensen (born 1956)
- Jan Grarup (born 1968)
- Ludvig Grundtvig (1836–1901)
- Georg Emil Hansen (1833–1891)
- Keld Helmer-Petersen (1920–2013)
- Ken Hermann
- Jacob Holdt (born 1947)
- Jesper Høm (1931–2000)
- Kirsten Klein (born 1945)
- Astrid Kruse Jensen (born 1975)
- Claus Bjørn Larsen (born 1963)
- Erling Mandelmann (1935–2018)
- Anton Melbye (1818–1875)
- Rigmor Mydtskov (1925–2010)
- Jacob Riis (1849–1914)
- Viggo Rivad (1922–2016)
- Leif Schiller (1939–2007)
- Lars Schwander (born 1957)
- Jacob Aue Sobol (born 1976)
- Mary Steen (1856–1939)
- Rudolph Striegler (1816–1876)
- Klaus Thymann (born 1974)
- Sigvart Werner (1872–1959)
- Mary Willumsen (1884–1961)

=== Estonia ===
- Kaupo Kikkas (born 1983)
- Jaan Künnap (born 1948)
- Johannes Pääsuke (1892–1918)
- Urmas Tartes (born 1963)

=== Finland ===
- Signe Brander (1869–1942)
- Elina Brotherus (born 1972)
- Joakim Eskildsen (born 1971)
- Ismo Hölttö (born 1940)
- Aino Kannisto (born 1973)
- Marjaana Kella (born 1961
- Ola Kolehmainen (born 1964)
- Sirkka-Liisa Konttinen (born 1948)
- Santeri Levas (1899–1987)
- Susanna Majuri (1978–2020)
- Arno Rafael Minkkinen (born 1945)
- Jyrki Parantainen (born 1962)
- Tero Puha (born 1971)
- Pentti Sammallahti (born 1950)

=== Germany ===
- Christian von Alvensleben (born 1941)
- Dieter Appelt (born 1935)
- Thomas Bak (born 1978)
- Kristian Liebrand (born 1973)
- Walter Ballhause (1911–1991)
- Uta Barth (born 1958)
- Bernd and Hilla Becher (1931–2007, 1934–2015)
- Hans Bellmer (1902–1975)
- Henning von Berg (born 1961)
- Sibylle Bergemann (1941–2010)
- Laurenz Berges (born 1966)
- Ruth Bernhard (1905–2006)
- Peter Bialobrzeski (born 1961)
- Patrick Bienert (born 1980)
- Karl Blossfeldt (1865–1932)
- Anna and Bernhard Blume (1936–2020, 1937–2011)
- Andreas Bohnenstengel (born 1970)
- Heinrich Brocksieper (1898–1968)
- Max Burchartz (1887–1961)
- Edmund Collein (1906–1992)
- Erich Consemüller (1902–1957)
- Peter Cornelius (1913–1970)
- Elger Esser (born 11 May 1967)
- Franz Fiedler (1885–1956)
- Helmut Gernsheim (1913–1995)
- Wilhelm von Gloeden (1856–1931)
- Franz Grainer (1871–1948)
- Andreas Gursky (born 1955)
- Peter Guttman
- John Gutmann (1905–1998)
- Esther Haase (born 1966)
- Siegfried Hansen (born 1961)
- Harald Hauswald (born 1954)
- John Heartfield (1891–1968)
- Fritz Henle (1909–1993)
- Hannah Höch (1889–1978)
- Thomas Hoepker (1936–2024)
- Heinrich Hoffmann (1885–1957)
- Carl Friedrich Höge (1834–1908)
- Lotte Jacobi (1896–1990)
- Gottfried Jäger (born 1937)
- Clemens Kalischer (1921–2018)
- Thomas Kellner (born 1966)
- Alex Kempkens (born 1942)
- Kevin Krautgartner (born 1988)
- Heinrich Kühn (1866–1944)
- Karl Lagerfeld (1933–2019)
- Ernst Heinrich Landrock (1878–1966)
- Hans G. Lehmann (born 1939)
- Peter Leibing (1941–2008)
- Esther Levine (born 1970)
- Peter Lindbergh (1944–2019)
- Herbert List (1903–1975)
- Alois Löcherer (1815–1862)
- Kurt Lubinski (1899–1955)
- Loretta Lux (born 1969)
- Felix H. Man (1893–1985)
- Oliver Mark (born 1963)
- Willy Matheisl (born 1950)
- Adolf de Meyer (1868–1946)
- Arwed Messmer (born 1964)
- Karsten Mosebach (born 1969)
- Hans Namuth (1917–1990)
- Helmut Newton (1920–2004)
- Josef H. Neumann (born 1953)
- Anja Niedringhaus (1965–2014)
- Hildegard Ochse (1935–1997]
- Walter Peterhans (1897–1960)
- Michael Poliza (born 1958)
- Guglielmo Plüschow (1852–1930)
- Albert Renger-Patzsch (1897–1966)
- Leni Riefenstahl (1902–2003)
- Michael Ruetz (1940–2024)
- Thomas Ruff (born 1958)
- Erich Salomon (1886–1944)
- August Sander (1876–1964)
- Jörg Sasse (born 1962)
- Curt O. Schaller (born 1964)
- Burkhard Schittny (born 1966)
- Michael Schmidt (1945–2014)
- Stefanie Schneider (born 1968)
- Martin Schoeller (born 1968)
- Katharina Sieverding (born 1944)
- Giorgio Sommer (1834–1914)
- Otto Steinert (1915–1978)
- Thomas Struth (born 1954)
- Ruben Talberg (born 1964)
- Gerda Taro (Gerta Pohorylle) (1910–1937)
- Juergen Teller (born 1964)
- Peter Thomann (born 1940)
- Elsa Thiemann (1910–1981)
- Karsten Thormaehlen (born 1965)
- Wolfgang Tillmans (born 1968)
- Herbert Tobias (1924–1982)
- Heinrich Tønnies (1825–1903)
- Ellen von Unwerth (born 1954)
- Chris von Wangenheim (1942–1981)
- Kai Wiedenhöfer (1966–2024)
- Charles Paul Wilp (1932–2005)
- Michael Wolf (1954–2019)
- Otto Wunderlich (1886–1975)
- Tobias Zielony (born 1973)

=== Hungary ===
- Brassaï (1899–1984)
- Cornell Capa (1918–2008)
- Robert Capa (1913–1954)
- Stephen Glass (photographer) (19??–1990)
- Zoltán Glass (1903–1981)
- Lucien Hervé (1910–2007)
- Judith Karasz (1912–1977)
- André Kertész (1894–1985)
- Imre Kinszki (1901–1945)
- László Moholy-Nagy (1895–1946)
- Martin Munkácsi (1896–1963)
- Nickolas Muray (1892–1965)
- Carol Szathmari (1812–1887)

=== Iceland ===
- Nökkvi Elíasson (born 1966)
- Ragnar Axelsson (born 1958)

=== Ireland ===
- Kevin Abosch (born 1969)
- Enda Bowe
- Bob Carlos Clarke (1950–2006)
- Eamonn Doyle (born 1969)
- Paul Gaffney (born 1979)
- Trish Morrissey (born 1967)
- Tony O'Shea (born 1947)

=== Italy ===
- Fratelli Alinari
- Olivo Barbieri (born 1954)
- Ernesto Bazan (born 1959)
- Antonio Beato (1825–1905)
- Felice Beato (1825–1903)
- Gianni Berengo Gardin (born 1930)
- Giacomo Brogi (1822–1881)
- Giacomo Brunelli (born 1977)
- Letizia Battaglia (1935–2022)
- Romano Cagnoni (1935–2018)
- Marcella Campagnano (born 1941)
- Ilario Carposio (1852–1921)
- Stefano Cerio
- Elio Ciol (born 1929)
- Nicolò Degiorgis (born 1985)
- Augusto De Luca (born 1955)
- Yvonne De Rosa (born 1975)
- Antonio Faccilongo (born 1979)
- Adolfo Farsari (1841–1898)
- Franco Fontana (born 1933)
- Piero Gemelli (born 1952)
- Luigi Ghirri (1943–1992)
- Mario Giacomelli (1925–2000)
- Gianfranco Gorgoni (1941–2019)
- Frank Horvat (1928–2020)
- Mimmo Jodice (born 1934)
- Vincenzo Laera (born 1966)
- Duccio Malagamba (born 1960)
- Fosco Maraini (1912–2004)
- Enrico Martino (born 1960)
- Tina Modotti (1896–1942)
- Ugo Mulas (1928–1973)
- Pino Musi (born 1958)
- Dianora Niccolini (born 1936)
- Giuseppe Palmas (1918–1977)
- Dino Pedriali (1950–2021)
- Paolo Pellizzari (born 1956)
- Secondo Pia (1855–1941)
- Fabio Ponzio (born 1959)
- Felice Quinto (1929–2010)
- Vittorio Sella (1859–1943)
- Frederick Sommer (1905–1999)
- Alberto Terrile (born 1961)
- Oliviero Toscani (born 1942)
- Luigi Veronesi (1908–1998)
- Massimo Vitali (born 1944)

=== Latvia ===
- Philippe Halsman (1906–1979)

=== Lithuania ===
- Izis Bidermanas (1911–1980)
- Vytautas Stanionis (1917–1966)
- Kęstutis Stoškus (born 1951)
- Antanas Sutkus (born 1939)
- Stanislovas Žvirgždas (born 1941)

=== Luxembourg ===
- Mark Divo (born 1966) art
- Marianne Majerus (born 1956)

=== Netherlands ===
- Hans Aarsman (born 1951)
- Emmy Andriesse (1914–1953)
- Iwan Baan (born 1975)
- Marwan Bassiouni (born 1985)
- Henze Boekhout (born 1947)
- Anton Corbijn (born 1955)
- Paul Cupido (born 1972)
- Rineke Dijkstra (born 1959)
- Ed van der Elsken (1925–1990)
- Karl Hammer (born 1959)
- Carli Hermès (born 1963)
- Rob Hornstra (born 1975)
- Ad Konings (born 1956)
- Jeroen Kramer (born 1967)
- Inez van Lamsweerde (born 1963)
- Frans Lanting (born 1951)
- Bertien van Manen (1935–2024)
- Erwin Olaf (born 1959)
- Pieter Oosterhuis (1816–1885)
- Eddy Posthuma de Boer (1931–2021)
- Rahi Rezvani (born 1978)
- José Manuel Rodrigues (born 1951)
- Marleen Sleeuwits (born 1980)
- Henricus Jacobus Tollens (1864–1936)
- Levi van Veluw (born 1985)

=== Portugal ===
- Helena Almeida (1934–2018)
- Joshua Benoliel (1873–1932)
- Daniel Blaufuks (born 1963)
- Ana Dias (born 1984)
- Frederick William Flower (1815–1889)
- Eduardo Gageiro (1935–2025)
- José Manuel Rodrigues (born 1951)

=== Romania ===
- Ioan Mihai Cochinescu (born 1951)
- Eddy Novarro (1925–2003)

=== Russia ===
- Alexey Brodovitch (1898–1971)
- George Hoyningen-Huene (1900–1968)
- Dmitry Markov (1982–2024)
- Yevgeny Khaldei (1917–1997)
- Rafail Sergeevich Levitsky (1844–1930)
- Sergei Lvovich Levitsky (1819–1898)
- El Lissitzky (1890–1941)
- Pyotr Otsup (1883–1963)
- Gueorgui Pinkhassov (born 1952)
- Sergey Ponomarev (born 1980)
- Irina Popova (born 1986)
- Sergei Mikhailovich Prokudin-Gorskii (1863–1944)
- Mark Redkin (1908–1987)
- Alexander Rodchenko (1891–1956)
- Yuri Rost (born 1939)
- Nicolas Tikhomiroff (1927–2016)
- Alexey Titarenko (born 1962)
- Roman Vishniac (1897–1990)

=== Slovakia ===
- Sarah Avni (born 1985)
- Irena Blühová (1904–1991)
- Yuri Dojc (born 1946)
- Peter Frolo
- Dezo Hoffmann (1912–1986)
- Patrik Jandak (born 1977)
- Jozef Božetech Klemens (1817–1883)
- Martin Kollar (born 1971)
- Eduard Nepomuk Kozič (1829–1874)
- Tono Stano (born 1960)
- Robert Vano (born 1948)

=== Slovenia ===
- Julie Martini (1871–1943)
- Justina Hermina Pacek (1931–2016)

=== Spain ===
- Delmi Álvarez (born 1958)
- Rogelio Bernal Andreo (born 1969)
- Francisco Boix (1920–1951)
- Xavi Bou (born 1979)
- Joan Colom (1921–2017)
- Joan Fontcuberta (born 1955)
- Marcel·lí Gausachs (1891–1931)
- Chema Madoz (born 1958)
- Pedro Madueño (born 1961)
- Isaura Marcos (born 1959)
- Isabel Muñoz (born 1951)
- José Ortiz-Echagüe (1886–1980)
- Joaquín del Palacio (1905–1989)
- Lua Ribeira (born 1986)
- Cristina García Rodero (born 1949)
- Txema Salvans (born 1971)
- Marqués de Santa María del Villar (1880–1976)

=== Sweden ===
- Sofia Ahlbom (1803–1868)
- Jens Assur (born 1970)
- Martin Bogren (born 1967)
- Anna Clarén (born 1972)
- Anders Edström (born 1966)
- Hedda Ekman (1860–1929)
- Åke Ericson (born 1962)
- Ingrid Falk (born 1960)
- Victor Hasselblad (1906–1978)
- Brita Sofia Hesselius (1801–1866)
- Olof Jarlbro (born 1978)
- Gerry Johansson (born 1945)
- Jan Töve Johansson (born 1958)
- Mattias Klum (born 1968)
- Jack Mikrut (born 1963)
- Lennart Nilsson (1922–2017)
- Anders Petersen (born 1944)
- Oscar Gustave Rejlander (1813–1875)
- Hilda Sjölin (1835–1915)

=== Switzerland ===
- Werner Bischof (1916–1954)
- René Burri (1933–2014)
- Michel Comte (born 1954)
- Carl Durheim (1810–1890)
- Hans Feurer (1939–2024)
- Robert Frank (1924–2019)
- Johann Baptist Isenring (1796–1860)
- Alwina Gossauer (1841–1926)
- Yann Gross (born 1981)
- Helmar Lerski (1871–1956)
- Pierre Rossier (1829–1883)
- Didier Ruef (born 1961)
- Roman Signer (born 1938)

=== Ukraine ===
- Igor Chekachkov (born 1989)
- Oleksandr Chekmenyov (born 1969)
- Mstyslav Chernov (born 1985)
- Maxim Dondyuk (born 1983)
- Gleb Garanich (born 1969
- Yuri Kosin (1948–2022)
- Igor Kostin (1936–2015)
- Nikolai Kozlovsky (1921–1996)
- Evgeniy Maloletka
- Boris Mikhailov (born 1938)
- Rita Ostrovskaya (born 1953)
- Ihor Podolchak (born 1962)
- Roman Pyatkovka
- Jury Rupin (1946–2008)
- Vasiliy Ryabchenko (born 1954)
- Arsen Savadov (born 1962)
- Anton Solomoukha (1945–2015)
- Anastasia Vlasova
- Yelena Yemchuk (born 1970)

=== United Kingdom ===
- William de Wiveleslie Abney (1843–1920)
- Ashley Perry Abraham (1876–1951)
- George Dixon Abraham (1871–1965)
- George Perry Abraham (1846–1923)
- Nudrat Afza
- Timothy Allen (born 1971)
- Martin Amis (born 1973)
- Martin Masai Andersen (born 1972)
- Tom Ang (born 1952)
- Malcolm Arbuthnot (1877–1967)
- Fred Archer (1889–1963)
- Antony Armstrong-Jones, 1st Earl of Snowdon known as "Snowdon" (1930–2017)
- Anna Atkins (1799–1871)
- Gerry Badger (born 1948)
- David Bailey (born 1938)
- Shirley Baker (1932–2014)
- Clive Barda (born 1945)
- Nigel Barker (born 1972)
- John S. Barrington (1920–1991)
- Emma Barton (1872–1938)
- Alexander Bassano (1829–1913)
- Richard Beard (1801–1885)
- Cecil Beaton (1904–1980)
- Francis Bedford (1816–1894)
- Ian Beesley (born 1954)
- George Beldam (1868–1937)
- Harry Benson (born 1929)
- Herbert Bowyer Berkeley (1851–1890)
- Richard Billingham (born 1970)
- Walter Bird (1903–1969)
- J. R. Black (1826–1880)
- John Blakemore (born 1936)
- Robert Blomfield (1938–2020)
- Dorothy Bohm (1924–2023)
- Henry Bond (born 1966)
- Samuel Bourne (1834–1912)
- Jane Bown (1925–2014)
- Tony Boxall (1929–2010)
- Alex Boyd (born 1984)
- Polly Braden (born 1974)
- Bill Brandt (1904–1983)
- Zana Briski (born 1966)
- Hamish Brown (born 1934)
- Marc Bryan-Brown
- Alfred Buckham (1879–1956)
- John Bulmer (born 1938)
- Victor Burgin (born 1941)
- Vanley Burke (born 1951)
- Will Burrard-Lucas (born 1983)
- Larry Burrows (1926–1971)
- Harry Burton (1879–1940)
- Lewis K. Bush (born 1988)
- Michael Busselle (1935–2006)
- Pogus Caesar (born 1953)
- Juno Calypso (born 1989)
- Julia Margaret Cameron (1815–1879)
- George Frederic Cannons (1897–1972)
- William Carrick (1827–1878)
- Lewis Carroll (1832–1898)
- Natasha Caruana (born 1983)
- Andrew Catlin (born 1960)
- Hugh Cecil (1892–1939)
- Allan Chappelow (1919–2006)
- Thomas Foster Chuck (1826–1898)
- William Clarridge
- Henry Collen (1797–1879)
- Georgina Cook
- Joe Cornish (born 1958)
- Douglas Corrance (born 1947)
- Joan Craven (1897–1979)
- Chris Craymer
- Mik Critchlow (1955–2023)
- Siân Davey (born 1984)
- Ron Davies (1921–2013)
- Richard Davis (born 1965)
- George Davison (1854–1930)
- Corinne Day (1962–2010)
- Peter Dazeley (born 1948)
- John Deakin (1912–1972)
- Hugh Welch Diamond (1808–1886)
- Graham Diprose
- Terence Donovan (1936–1996)
- Chris Dorley-Brown (born 1958)
- W. & D. Downey
- Gerald Drucker (1925–2010)
- Craig Easton
- Peter Henry Emerson (1856–1936)
- Frederick H. Evans (1853–1943)
- Jason Evans (born 1968)
- John Everard (1900–?)
- Robert Fairer (born 1966)
- Candice Farmer (born 1970)
- Alixandra Fazzina (born 1974)
- Roger Fenton (1819–1869)
- Graham Finlayson (1932–1999)
- Anna Fox (born 1961)
- Armet Francis (born 1945)
- Stuart Franklin (born 1956)
- Peter Fraser (born 1953)
- John French (1907–1966)
- Francis Frith (1822–1898)
- Peter Wickens Fry (1795–1860)
- Jill Furmanovsky (born 1953)
- Adam Fuss (born 1961)
- Alexander Gardner (1821–1882)
- George Georgiou (born 1961)
- Paula Rae Gibson (born 1968)
- Fay Godwin (1931–2005)
- Andy Goldsworthy (born 1956)
- Leah Gordon (born 1959)
- Paul Graham (born 1956)
- Eva Grant (1925–2024)
- Ken Grant (born 1967)
- Howard Grey (born 1942)
- Brian Griffin (born 1948)
- Ken Griffiths (1945–2014)
- Stuart Griffiths (born 1972)
- Ross Halfin (born 1957)
- E.R. Hall (1900–1982)
- David Hamilton (1933–2016)
- Bert Hardy (1913–1995)
- Misan Harriman (born 1977)
- Paul Hart (born 1961)
- Sam Haskins (1926–2009)
- Jamie Hawkesworth (born 1953)
- William Hayes (1871–1940)
- Darren Heath (born 1970)
- Tim Hetherington (1970–2011)
- Stuart Heydinger (5 May 1927 – 6 October 2019)
- Steve Hiett (1940–2019)
- David Octavius Hill (1802–1870)
- Alfred Horsley Hinton (1863–1908)
- David Hockney (born 1937)
- Thomas Hodges (born 1957)
- Frederick Hollyer (1838–1933)
- Eric Hosking (1909–1991)
- Robert Howlett (1831–1858)
- Tom Hunter (born 1965)
- David Hurn (born 1934)
- William H. Illingworth (1844–1893)
- Anthony Jones (born 1962)
- Charles Jones (1866–1959)
- Philip Jones Griffiths (1936–2008)
- Paul Joyce (born 1940s)
- Roshini Kempadoo (born 1959)
- Neil Kenlock (born 1950)
- Michael Kenna (born 1953)
- Paul Kenny (born 1951)
- James Kenny
- Anthony F. Kersting (1916–2008)
- Chris Killip (1946–2020)
- William Umpleby Kirk (1843–1928)
- Gary Knight (born 1964)
- Nick Knight (born 1958)
- Penny Lancaster (born 1971)
- Jack Latham (born 1989)
- Jim Lee (1945–2023)
- Rory Lewis (born 1982)
- Patrick Lichfield (1939–2005)
- Paul Lowe (1963–2024)
- Iain MacMillan (1938–2006)
- Duncan Macpherson (1882–1966)
- Daniel Marquis (1829–1879)
- Harrison Marks (1926–1997)
- Simon Marsden (1948–2012)
- Chloe Dewe Mathews (born 1982)
- Alfred Maudslay (1850–1931)
- John Jabez Edwin Mayall (1813–1901)
- Roger Mayne (1929–2014)
- Angus McBean (1904–1990)
- Eamonn McCabe (born 1948)
- Linda McCartney (1941–1998)
- Mary McCartney (born 1969)
- Don McCullin (born 1935)
- Dave McKean (born 1963)
- Joseph McKeown (1925–2007)
- Stephen McLaren
- Wendy McMurdo (born 1962)
- John McMurtrie (born 1969)
- Daniel Meadows (born 1952)
- Donald Mennie (1875–1941)
- Margaret Mitchell (born 1968)
- Mert and Marcus
- Bob Mazzer (born 1948)
- David Moore (born 1961)
- Derry Moore, 12th Earl of Drogheda (born 1937)
- Raymond Moore (1920–1987)
- Dennis Morris
- Eadweard Muybridge (1830–1904)
- Graham Nash (born 1942)
- Jimmy Nelson (born 1976)
- Zed Nelson (born 1960s)
- Mark Neville (born 1966)
- Sydney Newton (1875–1960)
- William Notman (1856–1935)
- Christopher Nunn (born 1983)
- Perry Ogden (born 1961)
- Jonathan Olley (born 1967)
- Robert Ormerod (born 1985)
- Stephens Orr (born 1990)
- Horace Ové (1936–2023)
- Graham Ovenden (1943–2022)
- Tim Page (1944–2022)
- Frederick Christian Palmer (1866–1939)
- John Eastman Palmer (1866–1941)
- William Eastman Palmer & Sons
- John Papillon (1838–1891)
- Richard Pare (born 1948)
- Norman Parkinson (1913–1990)
- Martin Parr (born 1952)
- Steve Parish (born 1965)
- Phil Penman (born 1977)
- Charlie Phillips (born 1944)
- Johny Pitts (born 1987)
- Mark Power (born 1959)
- Graeme Purdy (born 1971)
- Franki Raffles (1955–1994)
- Rankin (born 1966)
- Tony Ray-Jones (1941–1972)
- Paul Reas (born 1955)
- David Redfern (1936–2014)
- Sophy Rickett (born 1970)
- Grace Robertson (1930–2021)
- James Robertson (1813–1888)
- Ziki Robertson (1934–2000)
- Henry Peach Robinson (1830–1901)
- Mick Rock (1948–2021)
- George Rodger (1908–1995)
- Horatio Ross (1801–1886)
- Mary Rosse (1813–1885)
- Horace Roye (1906–2002)
- Dominic Rouse (born 1959)
- William Saunders (1832–1892)
- Khadija Saye (1990–2017)
- Charles Roscoe Savage (1832–1909)
- Jo Metson Scott
- Charles T. Scowen (1852–1948)
- Marco Secchi
- Charles Settrington (born 1955)
- Andy Sewell (born 1978)
- Syd Shelton (born 1947)
- Charles Shepherd (fl. 1858–1878)
- Victor Sloan (born 1945)
- Edwin Smith (1912–1971)
- Graham Smith (born 1947)
- Pennie Smith (born 1949)
- Sally Soames (1937–2019)
- Jem Southam (born 1950)
- Humphrey Spender (1910–2005)
- John Spinks
- Chris Steele-Perkins (born 1947)
- Brian David Stevens (born 1970)
- David Stewart (born 1958)
- John Stezaker (born 1949)
- Tom Stoddart (1953–2021)
- Jean Straker (1913–1984)
- Francis Meadow Sutcliffe (1853–1941)
- Homer Sykes (born 1949)
- Nik Szymanek (born 1953)
- Constance Fox Talbot (1811–1880)
- William Fox Talbot (1800–1877)
- Henry Taunt (1842–1922)
- Sam Taylor-Wood (born 1967)
- Anya Teixeira (1913–1992)
- John Thomson (1837–1921)
- Alys Tomlinson (born 1975)
- Jon Tonks (born 1981)
- John Topham (1908–1973)
- Linnaeus Tripe (1822–1902)
- Nick Turpin (born 1969)
- Henry Underhill (1855–1920)
- James Valentine (1815–1879)
- Marc Vallée (born 1968)
- Florence Vandamm (1883–1966)
- Nick Waplington (born 1965)
- Patrick Ward (born 1937)
- Allan Warren (born 1948)
- Albert Watson (born 1942)
- George Washington Wilson (1823–1893)
- Douglas Webb (1922–1996)
- Minnie Weisz (born 1972)
- Dorothy Wilding (1893–1976)
- Marc Wilson (born 1968)
- Vanessa Winship (born 1960)
- John Muir Wood (1805–1892)
- Walter B. Woodbury (1834–1885)
- Donovan Wylie (born 1971)
- Lorna Yabsley (born 1964)
- Yevonde (1893–1975)
- Paul Yule (born 1956)

== North America ==
=== Canada ===
- Bryan Adams (born 1959)
- Raymonde April (born 1953)
- Roy Arden (born 1957)
- George Barker (1844–1894)
- Roloff Beny (1924–1984)
- Robert Bourdeau (born 1931)
- Robert Burley (born 1957)
- Edward Burtynsky (born 1955)
- Yucho Chow (1876–1949)
- Lincoln Clarkes (born 1957)
- Sorel Cohen (born 1936)
- Bill Cunningham (1909–1993)
- Frederick Dally (1838–1914)
- Leonard Frank (1870–1944)
- Sunil Gupta (born 1953)
- Byron Harmon (1876–1942)
- Kiana Hayeri (born 1988)
- Fred Herzog (1930–2019)
- John Hryniuk
- Yousuf Karsh (1908–2002)
- Ian Lloyd (born 1953)
- Arnaud Maggs (1926–2012)
- Richard Maynard (1832–1907)
- Raphael Mazzucco
- Nicholas Morant (1910–1999)
- Freeman Patterson (born 1937)
- Bob Peterson (born 1944)
- Peter Pitseolak (1902–1973)
- Robert Polidori (born 1951)
- Raymond Henry St. Arnaud (born 1942)
- Michael Ernest Sweet (born 1979)
- Sam Tata (1911–2005)
- Larry Towell (born 1953)
- Jeff Wall (born 1946)
- Donald Weber (born 1973)
- Brian Wood (born 1948)

=== Cuba ===
- Luis Castaneda (born 1943)
- Alberto Korda (1928–2001)

=== Guatemala ===
- Sergio Izquierdo

=== Haiti ===
- Dieu-Nalio Chery (born 1981)

=== Jamaica ===
- Ester Anderson (born 1945)

=== Mexico ===
- Natalia Baquedano (1872–1936)
- Lola Álvarez Bravo (1903–1993)
- Manuel Álvarez Bravo (1902–2002)
- Alejandro Cartagena (born 1977)
- Edgar de Evia (1910–2003)
- Sergio Dorantes (born 1946)
- Yael Martínez (born 1984)
- Enrique Metinides (1934–2022)
- Rubén Ortiz Torres (born 1964)
- J. Michael Seyfert (born 1959)

=== Panama ===
- José Luis Rodríguez Pittí (born 1971)

=== United States ===
- Slim Aarons (1916–2006)
- Berenice Abbott (1898–1991)
- Sam Abell (born 1945)
- George W. Ackerman (1884–1962)
- Ansel Adams (1902–1984)
- Eddie Adams (1933–2004)
- Harriet Chalmers Adams (1875–1937)
- Robert Adams (born 1937)
- Shelby Lee Adams (born 1950)
- Alfred Shea Addis (1832–1886)
- Cris Alexander (1920–2012)
- William Albert Allard (born 1937)
- Khalik Allah (born 1985)
- Jules T. Allen (born 1947)
- Jane Fulton Alt (born 1951)
- Stephen Alvarez (born 1965)
- Rob Amberg (born 1947)
- Kalliope Amorphous (born 1978)
- Evan Amos (born 1983)
- George Edward Anderson (1860–1928)
- Blake Andrews (born 1968)
- Allan Arbus (1918–2013)
- Amy Arbus (born 1954)
- Diane Arbus (1923–1971)
- Hazel Larsen Archer (1921–2001)
- David Armstrong (1954–2014)
- Daniel Arnold
- Eve Arnold (1912–2012)
- Bill Aron (born 1941)
- Abraham Aronow (born 1940)
- Thomas E. Askew (1847–1914)
- Bill Atkinson (born 1951)
- Richard Avedon (1923–2004)
- Jerry Avenaim (born 1961)
- Justin Aversano (born 1992)
- John Baldessari (1931–2020)
- Jamie Baldridge (born 1975)
- James Presley Ball (1825–1904)
- Lewis Baltz (1945–2014)
- Susan Bank (born 1938)
- Tom Baril (born 1945)
- Tina Barney (born 1952)
- William A. Barnhill (1889–1987)
- George Barris (1922–2016)
- Pinky Bass (born 1936)
- Endia Beal (born 1988)
- Peter Hill Beard (1938–2020)
- Carol Beckwith (born 1945)
- Jamie Beck (born 1983)
- Arthur P. Bedou (1882–1966)
- Lawrence Beitler
- Charles Belden (1887–1966)
- William Bell (1830–1910)
- E. J. Bellocq (1873–1949)
- Robert Benecke (1835–1903)
- Berry Berenson (1948–2001)
- Andrew D. Bernstein
- John Benton-Harris (1939–2023)
- Jerry Berndt (1943–2013)
- James Bidgood (1933–2022)
- Edward Bierstadt (1824–1906)
- Jack Birns (1919–2008)
- Nydia Blas (born 1981)
- Ira Block (born 1949)
- Erwin Blumenfeld (1897–1969)
- A. Aubrey Bodine (1906–1970)
- Christopher Boffoli (born 1969)
- Skip Bolen (born 1960)
- Phil Borges (born 1942)
- Jack E. Boucher (1931–2012)
- Alice Boughton (1866–1943)
- Margaret Bourke-White (1904–1971)
- Alison Brady
- Mathew Brady (1823–1896)
- Jim Brandenburg (born 1945)
- Marilyn Bridges (born 1948)
- Sheila Pree Bright
- Anne Brigman (1869–1950)
- Mike Brodie (born 1985)
- Ben Brody
- Marc Bryan-Brown
- Elliott Jerome Brown Jr. (born 1993)
- Zoe Lowenthal Brown (1927–2022)
- Dan Budnik (1933–2020)
- Wynn Bullock (1902–1975)
- Christopher Burkett (born 1951)
- Keith Calhoun (born 1955)
- Harry Callahan (1912–1999)
- Loren Cameron (born 1959)
- Lana Z Caplan
- Paul Caponigro (born 1932)
- David Carol (born 1958)
- Dwight Carter (born 1943)
- Keith Carter (born 1948)
- Elinor Carucci (born 1971)
- Kyle Cassidy (born 1966)
- Dean Chamberlain (born 1954)
- Polly Chandler
- Dickey Chapelle (1919–1965)
- Don Hogan Charles (1938–2017)
- Bruce Charlesworth (born 1950)
- Sarah Charlesworth (1947–2013)
- John Chiara (born 1971)
- William Christenberry (1936–2016)
- Larry Clark (born 1943)
- William Claxton (1927–2008)
- Charles Clegg (1850–1937)
- Alvin Langdon Coburn (1882–1966)
- Mark Cohen (photographer) (born 1943)
- Florestine Perrault Collins (1895–1988)
- Lois Conner (born 1951)
- Linda Connor (born 1944)
- Martha Cooper (born 1943)
- Kate Cordsen (born 1964)
- Jeff Cowen (born 1966)
- Gregory Crewdson (born 1962)
- Ted Croner (1922–2005)
- Imogen Cunningham (1883–1976)
- Bill Cunningham (1929–2016)
- Asahel Curtis (1874–1941)
- Edward S. Curtis (1868–1952)
- Bill Curtsinger (born 1946)
- Louise Dahl-Wolfe (1895–1989)
- Binh Danh (born 1977)
- Joseph Dankowski (1932–2010)
- Eileen Darby (1916–2004)
- Bruce Davidson (born 1933)
- Daniel Davis Jr. (1813–1887)
- Robert Dawson (born 1950)
- F. Holland Day (1864–1933)
- Loomis Dean (1917–2005)
- Roy DeCarava (1919–2009)
- Joe Deal (1947–2010)
- Terry Deglau
- Jack Delano (1914–1997)
- Lou Dematteis
- Autumn de Wilde (born 1970)
- Philip-Lorca diCorcia (born 1951)
- Henry Diltz (born 1938)
- John Dominis (1921–2013)
- Don Donaghy (1936–2008)
- Jordan Doner
- Elsa Dorfman (1937–2020)
- Cheryl Machat Dorskind (born 1955)
- David Doubilet (born 1946)
- Jim Dow (born 1942)
- Rory Doyle (born 1983)
- Richard Drew (born 1946)
- Corinne Dufka
- David Douglas Duncan (1916–2018)
- Jeff Dunas (born 1954)
- Aimé Dupont (1842–1900)
- Dutton & Michaels
- Charles C. Ebbets (1905–1978)
- Harold Eugene Edgerton (1903–1990)
- Dudley Edmondson
- Hugh Edwards (1903–1986)
- John Paul Edwards (1884–1968)
- William Eggleston (born 1939)
- Rudolf Eickemeyer, Jr. (1862–1932)
- Alfred Eisenstaedt (1898–1995)
- Jill Enfield (born 1954)
- Mitch Epstein (born 1952)
- Elliott Erwitt (1928–2023)
- Dulah Marie Evans (1875–1951)
- James H. Evans (born 1954)
- Walker Evans (1903–1975)
- Chris Faust (born 1955)
- James Fee (1949–2006)
- Andreas Feininger (1906–1999)
- Mark Feldstein (1937–2001)
- Larry Fink (1941–2023)
- Leonard Fink (1930–1992)
- George Fiske (1835–1918)
- Sean Flynn (1941–1970)
- Neil Folberg (born 1950)
- Rahim Fortune (born 1994)
- Jona Frank (born 1966)
- Felice Frankel (born 1945)
- Thomas E. Franklin (born 1966)
- LaToya Ruby Frazier (born 1982)
- Leonard Freed (1929–2006)
- Jesse Freidin (born 1981)
- Adrienne French (born 1987)
- Jim French (1932–2017)
- Mary Frey (born 1948)
- Arny Freytag (born 1950)
- Lee Friedlander (born 1934)
- Eva Fuka (1927–2015)
- Ron Galella (1931–2022)
- Phyllis Galembo (born 1952)
- Louisa Bernie Gallaher (1858–1917)
- Harry Gamboa, Jr. (born 1951)
- William Garnett (1916–2006)
- David Brandon Geeting (born 1989)
- Matthew Genitempo (born 1983)
- Arnold Genthe (1869–1942)
- Carlo Gentile (1835–1893)
- Ralph Gibson (born 1939)
- Carl Giers (1828–1877)
- Bruce Gilden (born 1946)
- Steve Giovinco (born 1961)
- Barbara Gluck (born 1938)
- Frank Gohlke (born 1942)
- Anthony Goicolea (born 1971)
- Jim Goldberg (born 1953)
- Nan Goldin (born 1953)
- Miguel Gómez (born 1974)
- Rolando Gomez (born 1962)
- Glenalvin Goodridge (1829–1867)
- Greg Gorman (born 1949)
- John Gossage (born 1946)
- William P. Gottlieb (1917–2006)
- Hal Gould (1920–2015)
- Emmet Gowin (born 1941)
- Karen Graffeo
- Katy Grannan (born 1969)
- Hugh Grannum (1941–2013)
- Ken Graves (1942–2016) and Eva Lipman (born 1946)
- Jill Greenberg (born 1967)
- Herb Greene (born 1942)
- Timothy Greenfield-Sanders (born 1952)
- Lauren Greenfield (born 1966)
- Lois Greenfield (born 1949)
- Stan Grossfeld (born 1951)
- Bob Gruen (born 1945)
- Johan Hagemeyer (1884–1962)
- Bruce Hall
- Mark Robert Halper (born 1965)
- Dirck Halstead (1936–2022)
- Adelaide Hanscom (1875–1931)
- Charles Harbutt (1935–2015)
- John Harding (born 1940)
- Ron Harris (1933–2017)
- Alfred A. Hart (1816–1908)
- David Alan Harvey (born 1944)
- Ron Haviv (born 1965)
- Masumi Hayashi (1945–2006)
- Frank Jay Haynes (1853–1921)
- William Heick (1916–2012)
- Alexander Hesler (1823–1895)
- J Malan Heslop (1923–2011)
- R.C. Hickman (1922–2007)
- Todd Hido (born 1968)
- Chester Higgins Jr. (born 1946)
- John K. Hillers (1843–1925)
- David Hilliard (born 1964)
- Lewis Hine (1874–1940)
- Hiro (1930–2021)
- John Hoagland (1947–1984)
- David Hobby (born 1965)
- Joseph Holmes
- Horst P. Horst (1906–1999)
- Tama Hochbaum (born 1953)
- Charles Howard (1842–?)
- Tom Howard (1894–1961)
- Matt Hoyle
- Fred Hultstrand (1888–1968)
- John Humble (1944–2025)
- William Hundley (born 1976)
- Frank Hunter (born 1947)
- Art Hupy (1924–2003)
- George Hurrell (1904–1992)
- Philip Hyde (1921–2006)
- Jerry Interval (1923–2006)
- Walter Iooss (born 1943)
- Edith Irvine (1884–1949)
- Lee Isaacs
- Texas Isaiah
- Yasuhiro Ishimoto (1921–2012)
- William Henry Jackson (1843–1942)
- Michael Jang (born 1951)
- Ellei Johndro
- Acacia Johnson (born 1990)
- Belle Johnson (1864–1925)
- David Johnson (1926–2024)
- Alfred Cheney Johnston (1885–1971)
- John S. Johnston (1839–1899)
- Pirkle Jones (1914–2009)
- Anatol Josepho (1894–1980)
- Gertrude Käsebier (1852–1934)
- Consuelo Kanaga (1894–1978)
- Emy Kat (born 1959)
- Mary Morgan Keipp (1875–1961)
- Marie Hartig Kendall (1854–1943)
- David Michael Kennedy (born 1950)
- Robert Glenn Ketchum (born 1947)
- Miru Kim (born 1981)
- Darius Kinsey (1869–1945)
- William Klein (1928–1922)
- Mark Klett (born 1952)
- Russell Klika (born 1960)
- Stuart Klipper (born 1941)
- Joseph Knaffl (1861–1938)
- Karen Knorr (born 1954)
- Stacy Kranitz (born 1976)
- George Krause (born 1937)
- Barbara Kruger (born 1945)
- Yasuo Kuniyoshi (1893–1953)
- Justine Kurland (born 1969)
- David LaChapelle (born 1963)
- Vincent Laforet (born 1975)
- Dorothea Lange (1895–1965)
- Jim Laughead (1909–1978)
- Clarence John Laughlin (1905–1985)
- Shane Lavalette (born 1987)
- Alma Lavenson (1897–1989)
- Lisa Law (born 1943)
- Tom Lecky (born 1972)
- Russell Lee (1903–1986)
- Annie Leibovitz (born 1949)
- Neil Leifer (born 1942)
- Jacques Leiser
- Jim Leisy (1950–2014)
- Saul Leiter (1923–2013)
- Jesse Lenz (born 1988)
- Herman Leonard (1923–2010)
- Joanne Leonard (born 1940)
- Zoe Leonard (born 1961)
- Sherrie Levine (born 1947)
- David Levinthal (born 1949)
- Helen Levitt (1913–2009)
- Jerome Liebling (1924–2011)
- Lawrence Denny Lindsley (1879–1974)
- O. Winston Link (1914–2001)
- Susan Lipper (born 1953)
- Jacqueline Livingston (1943–2013)
- John Loengard (1934–2020)
- Sal Lopes (born 1943)
- Rodney Lough Jr. (born 1960)
- Jet Lowe (born 1947)
- Benjamin Lowy (born 1979)
- Joshua Lutz (born 1975)
- George Platt Lynes (1907–1955)
- Danny Lyon (born 1942)
- Nathan Lyons (1930–2016)
- Pirie MacDonald (1867–1942)
- Maxwell MacKenzie
- Vivian Maier (1926–2009)
- David Maisel (born 1961)
- Jay Maisel (born 1931)
- Christopher Makos (born 1948)
- Steve Mandel (born 1953)
- Sally Mann (born 1951)
- Jonathan Mannion (born 1970)
- Robert Mapplethorpe (1946–1989)
- Ken Marcus (born 1946)
- Joan Marcus (born 1953)
- Mary Ellen Mark (1940–2015)
- Jim Marshall (1936–2010)
- Louise Martin (1911–1995)
- Pat Martin
- Spider Martin (1939–2003)
- Oscar G. Mason (1830–1921)
- Margrethe Mather (1886–1952)
- Gordon Matta-Clark (1943–1978)
- Annu Palakunnathu Matthew (born 1964)
- Kate Matthews (1870–1956)
- Morton D. May (1914–1983)
- John McBride (born 1967)
- Will McBride (1931–2015)
- Chris McCaw (born 1971)
- Leonard McCombe (1923–2015)
- Chandra McCormick (born 1957)
- Steve McCurry (born 1950)
- Paul McDonough (born 1941)
- Joe McNally (born 1952)
- Laura McPhee (born 1958)
- Raymond Meeks (born 1963)
- Steven Meisel (born 1954)
- Susan Meiselas (born 1948)
- Jeff Mermelstein (born 1957)
- Justin Merriman (born 1977)
- Nick Meyer (born 1981)
- Sonia Handelman Meyer (1920–2022)
- Joel Meyerowitz (born 1938)
- Arthur Meyerson (born 1949)
- Duane Michals (born 1932)
- Fred E. Miller (1868–1936)
- Lee Miller (1907–1977)
- Richard Misrach (born 1949)
- Daniel S. Mitchell (1838–1929)
- Tyler Mitchell (born 1995)
- George F. Mobley (born 1935)
- Andrea Modica (born 1960)
- Vijat Mohindra (born 1985)
- Charles Moore (1931–2010)
- John Moran (1831–1902)
- Abelardo Morell (born 1948)
- Christopher Morris (born 1958)
- Wright Morris (1910–1998)
- Ray Mortenson (born 1944)
- Lida Moser (1920–2014)
- William McKenzie Morrison (1857–1921)
- Stephen Mosher (born 1964)
- David Muench (born 1936)
- Zora J. Murff (born 1987)
- Carl Mydans (1907–2004)
- Clay Myers
- James Nachtwey (born 1948)
- Billy Name (1940–2016)
- Arnold Newman (1918–2006)
- Marvin E. Newman (1927–2023)
- Lora Webb Nichols (1883–1962)
- Nicholas Nixon (born 1947)
- James B. Norman (born 1952)
- Zak Noyle (born 1985)
- Lee Nye (1926–1999)
- Pipo Nguyen-duy (born 1962)
- Nic Nicosia (born 1951)
- Michael O'Brien (born 1950)
- Catherine Opie (born 1961)
- Charles O'Rear (born 1941)
- Estevan Oriol
- Timothy O'Sullivan (1840–1882)
- Kevin Ou (born 1979)
- Paul Outerbridge (1896–1958)
- Bill Owens (born 1938)
- Tod Papageorge (born 1940)
- Coyote Park (born 1999)
- Gordon Parks (1912–2006)
- Winfield Parks (1932–1977)
- Robert ParkeHarrison (born 1968)
- Christian Patterson (born 1972)
- Irving Penn (1917–2009)
- Elle Pérez (born 1989)
- Lucian Perkins (born 1953)
- Philip Perkis (born 1935)
- John Pezzenti (1952–2007)
- John Pfahl (1939–2020)
- Jack Pierson (born 1960)
- Sylvia Plachy (born 1943)
- David Plowden (born 1932)
- Eliot Porter (1901–1990)
- Lucy Wallace Porter (1876–1962)
- Victor Prevost (1820–1881)
- Hal Prewitt (born 1954)
- Richard Prince (born 1949)
- Andrew Prokos (born 1971)
- Melanie Pullen (born 1975)
- Gerald P. Pulley (1922–2011)
- Herbert Randall (born 1936)
- Paul Raphaelson (born 1968)
- Susana Raab
- Jan Rattia (born 1974)
- William H. Rau (1855–1920)
- Man Ray (1890–1976)
- Marcia Reed (born 1948)
- Ryan Spencer Reed (born 1979)
- H. Reid (1925–1992)
- Lorne Resnick (born 1961)
- Michael Richard (born 1949)
- Eugene Richards (born 1944)
- Terry Richardson (born 1965)
- Meghann Riepenhoff (born 1979)
- Robert Riger (1924–1995)
- Frank Rinehart (1861–1928)
- Herb Ritts (1952–2002)
- Ruth Robertson (1905–1998)
- John V. Robinson (born 1960)
- Thomas C. Roche (1826–1895)
- Milton Rogovin (1909–2011)
- Matthew Rolston (born 1955)
- Thomas Roma (born 1950)
- Marcus Aurelius Root (1808–1888)
- Ben Rose (1916–1980)
- Barbara Rosenthal (born 1948)
- Joe Rosenthal (1911–2006)
- Martha Rosler (born 1943)
- Arthur Rothstein (1915–1985)
- Galen Rowell (1940–2002)
- Johnny Rozsa (born 1949)
- Andrew J. Russell (1829–1902)
- Manuel Rivera-Ortiz (born 1968)
- Mark Ruwedel (born 1954)
- Eugene de Salignac (1861–1943)
- Lucas Samaras (1936–2024)
- Arnold E. Samuelson (1917–2002)
- Joel Sartore (born 1962)
- Francesco Scavullo (1921–2004)
- Howard Schatz (born 1940)
- Rocky Schenck (born 1960)
- T. M. Schleier (1832–1908)
- Stefanie Schneider (born 1968)
- Bryan Schutmaat (born 1983)
- Bill Schwab (born 1959)
- John Schwartz (1858–1937)
- Morris Schwartz (1901–2004)
- Arthur E. Scott (1917–1976)
- Addison N. Scurlock (1883–1964)
- Art Seitz (1942–2025)
- Allan Sekula (1951–2013)
- Mark Seliger (born 1959)
- Craig Semetko (born 1961)
- Andres Serrano (born 1950)
- John Sexton (born 1953)
- Jamel Shabazz (born 1960)
- Charles Sheeler (1883–1965)
- Bob Shell (born 1946)
- Accra Shepp (born 1962)
- Cindy Sherman (born 1957)
- Thomas John Shillea (born 1947)
- Stewart Shining (born 1964)
- Janell Shirtcliff (born 1982/1983)
- Melissa Shook (1939–2020)
- Stephen Shore (born 1947)
- Julius Shulman (1910–2009)
- Marilyn Silverstone (1929–1999)
- Lorna Simpson (born 1960)
- Aaron Siskind (1903–1991)
- Sandy Skoglund (born 1946)
- Neal Slavin (born 1941)
- Moneta Sleet Jr. (1926–1996)
- Brian Smith
- Dayna Smith (born 1962)
- Henry Holmes Smith (1909–1986)
- Mickey Smith (born 1972)
- W. Eugene Smith (1918–1978)
- Rodney Smith (1947–2016)
- James Reuel Smith (1852–1935)
- Ming Smith
- Marvin Smith (1910–2003)
- Morgan Smith (1910–1993)
- Rick Smolan (born 1949)
- Herb Snitzer (1932–2022)
- Milton Snow (1905–1986)
- Melvin Sokolsky (1933–2022)
- Alec Soth (born 1969)
- Pete Souza (born 1954)
- Melissa Springer (born 1956)
- John Stanmeyer (born 1964)
- Chad States (born 1975)
- Will Steacy (born 1980)
- Edward Steichen (1879–1973)
- Ralph Steiner (1899–1986)
- Mark Steinmetz (born 1961)
- Stanley Stellar (born 1945)
- Jeffrey Lynn Stephanic (born 1946)
- Joel Sternfeld (born 1944)
- Louis Stettner (1922–2016)
- Alfred Stieglitz (1864–1946)
- Robert Stivers (born 1953)
- Nellie Stockbridge (1868–1965)
- Ezra Stoller (1915–2004)
- Dana Stone (1939–1970)
- Les Stone (born 1959)
- Tom Stone (born 1971)
- Paul Strand (1890–1976)
- Zoe Strauss (born 1970)
- Roy Stuart (born 1962)
- Jock Sturges (born 1947)
- Anthony Suau (born 1956)
- Larry Sultan (1946–2009)
- Kenneth Dupee Swan (1887–1970)
- Joseph Szabo (born 1944)
- John Szarkowski (1925–2007)
- I. W. Taber (1830–1912)
- Paulette Tavormina (born 1949)
- John Bigelow Taylor (born 1950)
- Maggie Taylor (born 1961)
- Brad Temkin (born 1956)
- Joyce Tenneson (born 1945)
- Al J Thompson (born 1980)
- Kyle Thompson (born 1992)
- Warren T. Thompson (active 1840–1870)
- George Tice (born 1938)
- Barbara Traub (born 1960)
- Bill Travis (born 1957)
- Eric Treacy (1907–1978)
- Arthur Tress (born 1940)
- Jules Trobaugh (born 1968)
- Thomas Tulis (born 1961)
- Spencer Tunick (born 1967)
- David C. Turnley (born 1955)
- Peter Turnley (born 1955)
- Jerry Uelsmann (1934–2022)
- Neal Ulevich
- Brian Ulrich (born 1971)
- Doris Ulmann (1882–1934)
- Steven Underhill (born 1962)
- John Vachon (1914–1975)
- Max Vadukul (born 1961)
- James Van Der Zee (1886–1983)
- Carl Van Vechten (1880–1964)
- Kathy Vargas (born 1950)
- Salvatore Vasapolli (born 1955)
- John Veltri (born 1938)
- Kiino Villand
- Scott Vlaun (born 1958)
- Nicholas Vreeland (born 1954)
- Evan Vucci (born 1977)
- William George Wadman (born 1975)
- Andre D. Wagner (born 1986)
- Bob Walker (1952–1992)
- Andy Warhol (1928–1987)
- Marion E. Warren (1920–2006)
- Waswo X. Waswo (born 1953)
- Carleton Watkins (1829–1916)
- Bruce Weber (born 1946)
- Weegee (1899–1968)
- Carrie Mae Weems (born 1953)
- William Wegman (born 1942)
- Ryan Weideman (born 1941)
- Terri Weifenbach
- Eudora Welty (1909–2001)
- Henry Wessel, Jr. (1942–2018)
- Brett Weston (1911–1993)
- Cole Weston (1919–2003)
- Edward Weston (1886–1958)
- Kim Weston (born 1953)
- John H. White (born 1945)
- Lily White (1866–1944)
- Minor White (1908–1976)
- Jeff Widener (born 1956)
- Janine Wiedel (born 1947)
- Leigh Wiener (1929–1993)
- Hannah Wilke (1940–1993)
- Christopher Williams (born 1956)
- D'Angelo Lovell Williams (born 1992)
- Michael Williamson (born 1957)
- Deborah Willis (born 1948)
- Ben Willmore (born 1967)
- Bob Willoughby (1927–2009)
- Laura Wilson (born 1939)
- Kathryn Tucker Windham (1918–2011)
- Merry Moor Winnett (1951–1994)
- Garry Winogrand (1928–1984)
- Lucian Wintrich (born 1988)
- Dawn Wirth (born 1960)
- Ernest Withers (1922–2007)
- Joel-Peter Witkin (born 1939)
- Marion Post Wolcott (1910–1990)
- Art Wolfe (born 1951)
- Bernard Pierre Wolff (1930–1985)
- Francesca Woodman (1958–1981)
- Don Worth (1924–2009)
- Bruce Wrighton (1950–1988)
- Thomas Joseph Wynne (photographer) (1838–26 October 1893)
- Max Yavno (1911–1985)
- Bunny Yeager (1929–2014)
- Jerome Zerbe (1904–1988)
- David Zimmerman (photographer) (born 1955)
- John G. Zimmerman (1927–2002)
- David Drew Zingg (1923–2000)
- Fred Zinn (1892–1960)
- Monte Zucker (1929–2007)

== Oceania ==
=== Australia ===
- David Adams (born 1963)
- Jack Atley (born 1968)
- Peter Bainbridge (born 1957)
- Daniel Berehulak (born 1975)
- Barcroft Capel Boake (1838–1921)
- Jarrod Castaing (born 1983)
- Harold Cazneaux (1878–1953)
- Neville Coleman (1938–2012)
- Edwin Dalton (active 1818–1867)
- Peter Dombrovskis (1945–1996)
- Ken Duncan (born 1954)
- Max Dupain (1911–1992)
- Adam Ferguson (born 1978)
- Frederick Frith (1819–1871)
- Bill Gekas (born 1973)
- Mark Gray (born 1981)
- Hans Hasenpflug (1907–1977)
- Bill Henson (born 1955)
- Graham Howe (born 1950)
- Frank Hurley (1885–1962)
- Russell James (born 1962)
- Barry Kay (1932–1985)
- Charles Kerry (1857–1928)
- Peter Lik (born 1959)
- Darryn Lyons (born 1965)
- Daniel Marquis (1829–1879)
- Peter Milne (born 1960)
- Izzy Orloff (1891–1983)
- Charles Page (born 1946)
- Trent Parke (born 1971)
- Cillín Perera (born 1977)
- Robert Rankin (born 1951)
- Robert Rosen (born 1953)
- Wolfgang Sievers (1913–2007)
- Steven Siewert (born 1964)
- Andrew Stark (born 1964)
- H. H. Tilbrook (1848–1937)
- Olegas Truchanas (1923–1972)
- Ian Wallace (born 1972)
- Charles Woolley (1834–1922)
- Anne Zahalka (born 1957)
- Andrew Rovenko (born 1978)

=== New Zealand ===
- Laurence Aberhart (born 1949)
- Mark Adams (born 1949)
- Harvey Benge (1944–2019)
- Brian Brake (1927–1988)
- Jessie Buckland (1878–1939)
- Peter Bush (1930–2023)
- Rosaline Margaret Frank (1864–1954)
- Marti Friedlander (1928–2016)
- Anne Geddes (born 1956)
- Ken Griffiths (1945–2014)
- Geoff Moon (1915–2009)
- Robin Morrison (1944–1993)
- Ans Westra (1936–2023)

=== Philippines ===
- Juan Paolo Aquino (living)

== South America ==
=== Argentina ===
- Gustavo Aguerre (born 1953)
- Horacio Coppola (1906–2012)
- Sara Facio (born 1932)
- Esteban Gonnet (1829–1868)
- Annemarie Heinrich (1912–2005)
- Alejandro Kuropatwa (1956–2003)
- Adriana Lestido (born 1955)
- Grete Stern (1904–1999)

=== Brazil ===
- Miguel Rio Branco (born 1946)
- Marc Ferrez (1843–1923)
- Vik Muniz (born 1961)
- Arthur Omar (born 1948)
- Sebastião Salgado (born 1944)
- Sérgio Valle Duarte (born 1954)
- Cássio Vasconcellos (born 1965)
- Guy Veloso (born 1969)
- Felipe Dana (born 1985)
- Gustavo Chams (born 1994)

=== Chile ===
- Ricardo Carrasco (born 1965)
- Jesús Inostroza (born 1956)
- Carlos Reyes-Manzo (born 1944)
- Valeria Zalaquett (born 1971)

=== Colombia ===
- Ricardo Acevedo Bernal (1867–1930)
- Jesús Abad Colorado (born 1967)
- Miguel Gómez (born 1974)
- Nereo López (1920–2015)
- Leo Matiz (1917–1998)

=== Ecuador ===
- Hugo Cifuentes (1923–2000)

=== Peru ===
- Martín Chambi (1891–1973)
- Mario Testino (born 1954)
- Pedro Jarque (born 1963)

=== Suriname ===
- Augusta Curiel (1873–1937)
- Gustaaf Martinus Oosterling (1873–1928)

=== Venezuela ===
- Ricardo Gómez Pérez (born 1952)
- Alejandro López de Haro (1949–2010)
- Ronaldo Schemidt (born 1971)

== See also ==
- List of photojournalists
- List of black photographers
- List of street photographers
- List of women photographers
- List of Jewish American photographers
- List of most expensive photographs
- List of museums devoted to one photographer
- Wikipedian Photographers
- Photographers of the American Civil War
- Photographers of the African-American civil rights movement
- Photography in the Philippines
- Photography of Sudan
