= Scowen =

Scowen is a surname. Notable people with the surname include:

- Charles T. Scowen (1852–1948), British photographer
- Eric Frank Scowen (1910–2001), English physician
- Jack Scowen (1935–2001), Canadian politician
- Josh Scowen (born 1993), British footballer
- Reed Scowen (1931–2020), Canadian business executive, author, and politician
- Sam Scowen (born 1987), British paracanoeist and former adaptive rower
