= Peter Bainbridge =

Peter Bainbridge may refer to:

- Peter Bainbridge (footballer) (born 1958), English footballer
- Peter Bainbridge (silkscreen artist) (born 1957), Australian fashion photographer
