= Eugène Lemaire =

Belgian photographer (1874–1948)

Eugène Lemaire (Vireux-Molhain, 1874 – Charleroi, 1948) was a Belgian pictorialist photographer. He is an excellent artist of portrait and still life. He was a friend of fellow Belgian pictorialist Léonard Misonne.

== Exhibitions ==
- XXVIIème Salon International d'Art Photographique, 1932.(Paris, France).
- 1er Salon International de Charleroi, 1934. (Charleroi, Belgium).
- Cercle photographique Verviétois, 1938 (Verviers, Belgium).
- Exhibitions in USA (Los Angeles), Canada and Germany.(Source:Vintage Works, Ltd, USA)
- Maison de la Culture de Namur, 2003 (Namur, Belgium)
- Musée d'Art Letton de Riga. Expo Art/W20, 2005 (Riga, Latvia)

== Bibliography ==
- Pour une histoire de La photographie en Belgique, Musée de la Photographie, Charleroi 1993.
- De photokunst in Belgïe 1839–1940 Het Sterkshof.
- XXème siècle, L'Art en Wallonie Renaissance du Livre, 2001

== See also ==
- List of photographers
