= Michael Meyersfeld =

South African photographer

- Born: June 5, 1940 (age 85); Johannesburg, South Africa
- Spouse: Saranne Meyersfeld
- Website: meyersfeld.com

Michael Meyersfeld is a fine art photographer living and working in Johannesburg, South Africa. Meyersfeld works with both fine art and advertising photography.

== Life and work ==
Born to a South African mother and French-German father, Meyersfeld's interest in photography began at a very early age when he made his first contact prints from a Baby Brownie camera at his family home in Johannesburg. He was schooled at King Edward Vll, and attained a B.Com. in 1961, from the University of the Witwatersrand, after which he joined the family steel merchandising business.

At 47, he left the family business and for the next twenty years worked as an advertising photographer, all the while exhibiting his fine art work. Most of Meyersfeld's photographs require a level of ‘staging'. As examples, Life Staged, a series consisting of four bodies of work, 12 Naked Men (2007), Woman Undone, Guests at the Troyeville Hotel and Urban Disquiet. Gradually the representational has made way for pictures that happen without planning.

== Awards ==
- 2009 - 1 Gold Award - Professional Advertising Category (Yum Yum Purple)
- 2010 - Gold Non-Commissioned Body Single (Alex Church), London AOP Awards, London

== Exhibitions ==
- 2012: Retrospective: ABSA Gallery
- 2011: Transience: In Toto Gallery
- 2007: David Brown Gallery

== Publications ==
- Gaze. ISBN 0-620-29066-8
- Life Staged. ISBN 978-0-620-48049-9. Accompanied the exhibition of the same title.
