= Jim Laughead =

Photographer

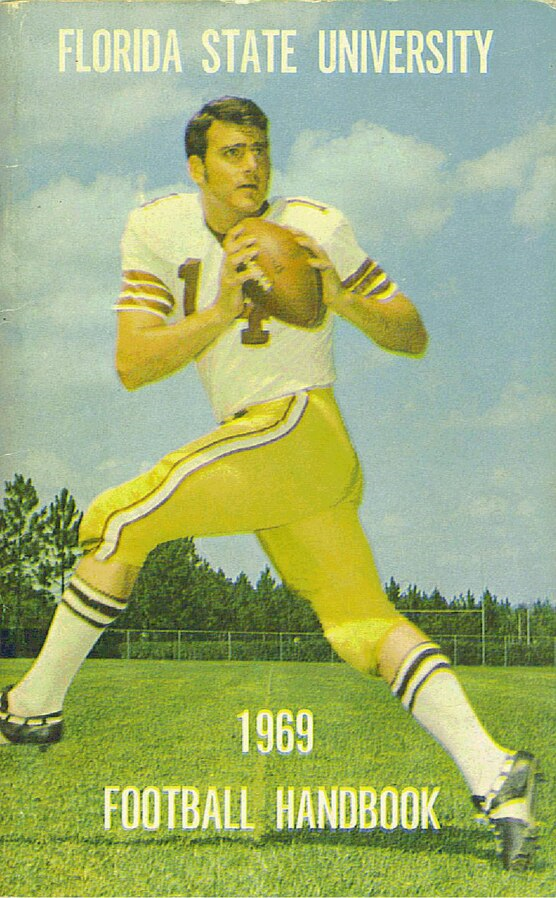
Photograph by Laughead of Florida State Seminoles quarterback Bill Cappleman, used on the cover of the program's 1969 media guide

James Laughead (July 21, 1909 – 1978) was a photographer whose style defined the art of posed sports photography. He developed techniques for posing athletes to appear as if they were in action. He coined the term "huck 'n' buck" to describe the style. His photos appeared in Life and in Sports Illustrated. His style was of posing players was often imitated, and influenced many of the sports photographers of his era.
