= Jesse Freidin =

American photographer

Jesse Evan Freidin
- Born: Boston, MA, United States
- Known for: Photography
- Notable work: 'The Doggie Gaga Project'

Jesse Evan Freidin is a fine art photographer. For his 'Doggie Gaga Project', in early 2010, Freidin dressed canine models in five of Lady Gaga's most celebrated outfits, and photographed them using two packs of Polaroid film from the last remaining supply.

== Photography ==
Jesse Evan Freidin is a fine art photographer known for his black-and-white dog portraiture, including the 2010 series ''The Doggie Gaga Project'', in which canine subjects were styled after outfits worn by Lady Gaga. His recognizable black and white fine art dog photography. In 2017 his first book of dog photography was published by Lyons Press, called Finding Shelter: Portraits of Love, Healing and Survival. His second book was published by Lerner Books, called When Dogs Heal: Powerful Stories of People Living with HIV and the Dogs That Saved Them.

== Shift in focus ==
After nearly 15 years of dog photography, Freidin shifted his focus. As a queer-identified photographer, he decided to focus his attention on elevating the experience of the trans/non-binary community through portraiture and interviews. After nearly 15 years of focusing on dog photography, Freidin shifted his work toward portraiture, exploring the experiences of trans and non-binary individuals. His series ''Are You OK?'' addresses the impact of recent anti-trans legislation and has received recognition from The Los Angeles Center of Photography.

== Personal life ==
Freidin grew up in the suburbs of Boston and spent time in New Hampshire, Vermont, and Cape Cod. He began photographing local landscapes when he was young. He is largely self-taught, having apprenticed at a portrait studio in San Francisco and taken classes at City College of San Francisco.

== See also ==
- Portrait photography
- LGBT art
- Transgender rights in the United States
