= Marqués de Santa María del Villar =

Diego de Quiroga y Losada
- Born: August 18, 1880; Madrid, Spain
- Died: May 15, 1976 (aged 95); San Sebastián, Spain
- Spouse: Narcisa Valdés y Palavicino
- Children: 3

Diego Quiroga y Losada, Marqués de Santa María del Villar, (Marquess of Santa María del Villar), was born in Madrid in 1880 and died in San Sebastián in 1976. He took pictures of many places of Spain, its landscapes, monuments and people.

== Biography ==
He started his work in the early 20th century and ended in the 1960s. As a member of the nobility, he was close to Alfonso XIII, king of Spain. He took pictures of the daily work of the king and he also took photos when the king was doing some sport (hunting). He was asked to be the president of the National Patronage of Tourism, but he did not accept this post. However, his photos represented the same image of Spain as the kind of images encouraged by the National Patronage. His pictures were published in magazines and newspapers like Blanco y Negro, Vértice and Trenes.

Before the Spanish Civil War (1936), he had more than 120,000 photographs, but many of them were destroyed during this war.

His photographic style was pictorialism, but lately he changed to documental and ethnographic photography in order to show the way Spain looked like after the war. Most of his collection is in the Archivo Real y General de Navarra in Pamplona, which held several exhibitions of his work.

He was also founder of photographic societies in Madrid and Guipúzcoa.

His marriage to Narcisa Valdés y Palavincino resulted in 3 children, including José Quiroga y Valdés (1913-1995).
