= Olof Jarlbro =

Swedish photographer (born 1978)

Olof Jarlbro (born 10 July 1978 in Helsingborg, Sweden) is a Swedish photographer. At the age of 19 Olof made his military service as a Lapland Ranger (Lapland Ranger Regiment) in the most northern part of Sweden located some 150 kilometers north of the Arctic Circle in Lapland.

He started to photograph at the age of 20. At the age of 22 he moved to New York and studied photojournalism at Icp, international center of photography. At the year 2002 he went to Nepal, a place he consider a second home for almost a decade, covering the political situation and subjects which he calls” The one the west forgotten” Such as the stone factory, a place where women and children works at small stone mill. In 2006 he moved to Prague, Czech Republic for studies at Famu School of performing art, film and TV. He works for numerous magazines and are widely exhibit throughout Europe.

In the year 2008 he published the book The falling Kingdom Kant Publishing House. The book covering the Nepalese Civil War. But most of all, it reveals an old country on the doorstep for rapid transformation. The year 2010 he published the book Stonefactory Rough Dog Press and 2011 the book Nepal and Mao Rough Dog Press.

In 2012, Olof Jarlbro entered Syria illegally to cover the insurgent Free Syrian Army (FSA) struggles against the Assad regime. Jarlbro spends his time in the different frontlines around Syria’s largest city, Aleppo. Jarlbro’s work from Syria got published 2013 in the book Syria: The War Within Rough Dog Press. The book was received with good reviews in Swedish dailies and also led to Swedish TV appearance were Jarlbro talks about his extreme time in Syria.

== Sources ==
- Radio wave (interview Kingdom of Nepal
- Fotografia magazine 06/2007,
- Reflex magazine 37/2005,
- Review Swedish dailies
- Helsingborgs Dagblad
