= Josef Větrovský =

Czech photographer

Josef Větrovský (1897 –1944) was a Czech photographer from Prague, a direct student of František Drtikol.

He died of a heart attack in 1944.

== Life and work ==
He photographed mainly portraits and nudes. In 1926, he took part in the exhibition of the Czech Photographic Society, which was supported by Josef Sudek, Jaromír Funke and Adolf Schneeberger. In the autumn of 1939, he organized his own retrospective, which was very valuable at the time. In the first half of the 1930s, he was a student of František Drtikol, and similar subjects, props, people and compositions appear in his photographs.
