= David Brandon Geeting =

American visual artist

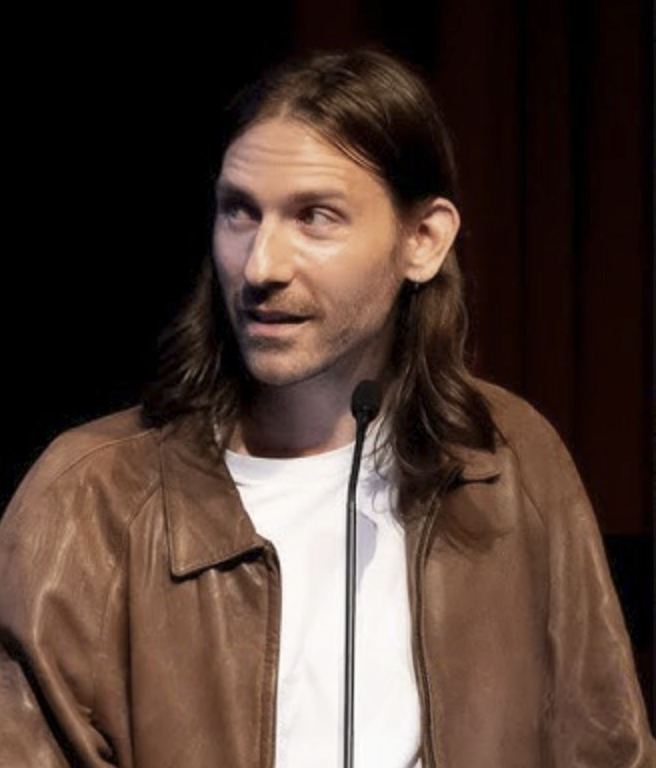
- Geeting speaking at Nicer Tuesdays in 2024
- Born: February 24, 1989 (age 37)
- Education: Bachelor of Fine Arts in Photography
- Alma mater: New York's School of Visual Arts
- Occupations: Visual artist; photographer
- Known for: New media, digital art
- Movement: Contemporary
- Website: dbg.nyc

David Brandon Geeting (born 1989) is a photographer and artist based in New York City. His work bridges genres, including a mix of still life, portraiture, and happenstance captures.

== Early life and education ==
Geeting graduated from New York's School of Visual Arts in 2011.

== Career ==
Geeting has named William Eggleston and Roe Ethridge as two important artists who influenced his work. He has been commissioned to take photographs for publications such as The New York Times, Vogue, and Time.

In 2015, his monograph Infinite Power was published by Pau Wau Publications. In 2017, his second book Amusement Park was published by Lodret Vandret.

Journalist Michael Paulson considered Geeting as a skilled artist in "object portraiture".

== Exhibitions ==
- 2018: Amusement Park, Janet Borden (New York City)
- 2020: Neighborhood Stroll, Janet Borden (New York City)
- 2022: The Marble, 10 14 Gallery (London)

== Books ==
- Infinite Power. Pau Wau Publications, 2015.
- Amusement Park. Lodret Vandret, 2017.
- Neighborhood Stroll. Skinnerboox and Same Paper, 2019. ISBN 978-88-94895-22-3
- A Spell Too Far (with Lina Sun Park). Same Paper, 2021. ISBN 978-988-75196-2-1
- The Marble. TBW Books, 2025. ISBN 978-1-942953-80-7

== Personal life ==
Geeting lives in New York City with his partner Lina Sun Park.
