= Peter Frolo =

Slovak photographer

- Born: Czechoslovakia
- Known for: Photography, photojournalism
- Website: peterfrolo.com

Peter Frolo is a Slovak photographer.

A recipient of the journalism award for the Best Journalist Photograph in 2004, he also became known in his homebase as a member of the Photo Challenge jury in 2011.

== Exhibitions ==
- 2011: Orange JOJ Music Summer by Peter Frolo – JOJ Café, Aupark, Bratislava, Slovakia

== Awards ==
| Year | Nominated work | Award | Category | Result | |
|---|---|---|---|---|---|
| 2004 | "Zavalený" ("Buried Under") | Journalism Award by Open Society Foundation | Best Journalist Photograph | (Slovakia) | Won |
Note: For a series of three photographs published by/for Nový čas.
