= Jesse Lenz =

American photographer

Jesse Lenz (born 1988) is an American photographer.

== Life and work ==
Lenz was born in Montana in 1988. He was a co-founder and publisher of The Collective Quarterly and The Coyote Journal. He is the founder of monthly book club The Charcoal Book Club, its publishing arm Charcoal Press, and the Chico Hot Springs Portfolio Review.

After a few years of traveling through the US in an Airstream with his wife and three sons, Lenz settled on a farm in Ohio. His first book, The Locusts (2020), shows his children immersed in the rural setting, exploring their home and the wildlife that surrounds it. It is made using black-and-white film. A second volume, The Seraphim, was published in 2023. Made over four years, it continues to look through the lens of his now six children, at "the wonder of life and the rhythms of nature".

== Publications ==
- The Locusts. Charcoal, 2020. ISBN 978-0-578-67947-1.
- The Seraphim. Charcoal, 2023. ISBN 978-1-7362345-3-2.
