= Raymond Henry St. Arnaud =

Canadian photographer

Raymond St. Arnaud, "Flower 7412", 2009, inkjet mounted to acrylic

Raymond Henry St. Arnaud (born June 24, 1942, in Edmonton, Alberta) is a Canadian photographer.

== Work ==
St. Arnaud would often take on jobs for a few months at a time, then leave and use the money he had earned to pursue his next photography project. At one point in his life, he left his job to take a series of landscape photos – fifteen of which ended up in Canada's National Gallery.

When he moved to Victoria, British Columbia, he started working for Camosun College on a temporary basis and stayed for 20 years.

In December 2010, he was included in the PrintedArt collection and has since then been one of its most prolific artists.

== Exhibitions and publications ==
=== Notable solo exhibitions ===
- Outside the Box solo exhibitions in Reno, NV and Dublin, OH
- Helen Smith Gallery in Auburn Washington
- Southern Light Gallery in Amarillo
- 3-day sale on GILT.com

=== Group exhibitions ===
- SigGraph 2003
- metaLphor at Art Institute of California, San Diego. Two simultaneous exhibitions from September 1 to October 1, 2011
- Theater of the Mind 2002
- Eye Appeal
- Homage
- Beecher Center Digital Art Competition 2001
- Art Incognito
- ASCI Digital 2002

=== Books ===
- Secrets from the museums of Paris
- Random Walks
- Sortie ... the Running Man
- 27 after 25
- As Seen On TV
- Outside the Box
- Reflections: The Pre-Millennium Landscapes
- Visit to a Surrey Townhouse
- The Forced March
- The Dysfunctional Photographer
- The Amdahl Graphics
- Solo Artist's First Flight
- Island Illustrators
- Frank Gurney ... engraver
- Evenlyn de R. McMann: Biographical Index of Artists in Canada (University of Toronto)

=== Other publications ===
- The Island Illustrator Society...25th anniversary...68 studio visits
- Digital Art Guild
- Opus Framing & Art
- New Trail (University of Alberta)
- Will the Real Alberta Please Stand Up (in New Trail)
