= Josef Hoflehner =

Austrian photographer (born 1955)

Josef Hoflehner (born 1955) is an Austrian photographer known for his dramatic black-and-white landscape and subtle color images. He is also known for his "Jet Airliner" series—mostly high-key photographs of people on Maho Beach on the Caribbean island of St. Maarten, overshadowed by low-flying passenger planes taking off and landing at Princess Juliana International Airport. He was voted Nature Photographer of the Year 2007, and named as one of "Austria's 10 Best Contemporary Artists" in 2014.

== Photobooks ==
- Southern Ocean (2002)
- Frozen History (2003)
- Gegendum (2004)
- Unleashed (2005)
- Yemen (2006)
- Iceland (2006)
- Unleashed Two (2007)
- Big Island (2008)
- Li River (2008)
- Nine 9 (2008)
- China (2009)
- Jet Airliner. Wels, Austria: Most, 2009. ISBN 9783902600066.
- Unleashed 3 (2010)
- ZNZ: Zanzibar (2011)
- Jet Airliner: the Complete Works. Wels, Austria: Most, 2012. ISBN 978-3902600110.
- Retrospective 1975 - 2015 (2015 teNeues)

== Exhibitions ==
- Frozen History, Atlas Gallery, London, 2006
- Sublime, Stephen Cohen Gallery, Los Angeles, 2010
