= Caroline Gibello =

South African photographer

Caroline Gibello (born 1974), is a South African fine art nature photographer. In 2007 she founded the Galleria Gibello chain of art galleries in Cape Town, South Africa.

Gibello's breakthrough series of work was called "At the Stillpoint of the Turning World". This opened up many doors for her and led to her work being collected by hotels, art collectors, interior decorators, and national art collections.

In 2008 Gibello toured Southern Africa visiting Namibia, Botswana and Mozambique. During her travels she took various photographs that became her "Water & Dust" series. She exhibited the work at Centre for the Book in Cape Town, South Africa, in December 2008. The exhibition was a collaboration between Gibello and a close friend, fine art artist and illustrator, Sharon Boonzaier. The exhibition consisted of clean photography and a group of collaborative works. The collaborative work contained Gibello's photographs added with Boonzaier's etchings and oil paint strokes. The exhibition was received positively by the critics. On the back of the success of this exhibition Gibello has been invited to exhibit in Mumbai (India) in April 2009, Lake Como (Italy) in July 2009 and also in Hamburg (Germany) in August 2009.

In January 2009 one of her early photographs from 2002 was selected for the first issue of the National Geographic Traveler South Africa. Another of her photographs has since been selected for the second issue of the same magazine.

2010 to 2017 Caroline continued to build a large following around the world. Her wildlife African prints hang on the walls of the Reserve Bank South Africa, University of Cape Town (UCT), Tuynhuys (The Presidency), as well as Deutsche Bank (New York)

Caroline exhibited her work for the month of May 2018 in New York.
