= Daniel Attoumou Amicchia =

Ghanaian photographer (1908–1994)

Daniel Attoumou Amicchia (1908–1994) was a Ghanaian photographer who settled in Grand-Bassam, Ivory Coast.

== Early life and career ==
Amicchia was introduced to photography in 1920s. In 1948, he settled in Grand-Bassam, Ivory Coast, where he was active until 1970. In Grand-Bassam, he kept in contact with the English-speaking Ghanaian community in Côte d'Ivoire, whom he photographed extensively. He acted like a "travelling merchant" and produced photographs of families and businesses. Little is known about Amicchia's life and career, as he was largely undocumented and his family threw away his archives after his death.

Amicchia's partner, Joseph Ernest Kouao, however, kept and preserved the remnants of the photographer's archive. Revue Noire featured Amicchia's photographs in 1991. Since then, his photographs have appeared in many exhibitions in the west.

== Death ==
Amicchia died from cancer in 1994.
