= Wim Tellier =

Belgian photographer and artist

Wim Tellier is a Belgian photographer and artist known for his installation projects using giant-size photographs. His projects have included covering 800 square meters of the Antwerp docks with six giant photos of elderly nude sunbathers, and his "Protect 7–7" project, the first installation art project in Antarctica, and one at Knokke-Heist in Belgium.
