= Yann Gross =

Swiss photographer

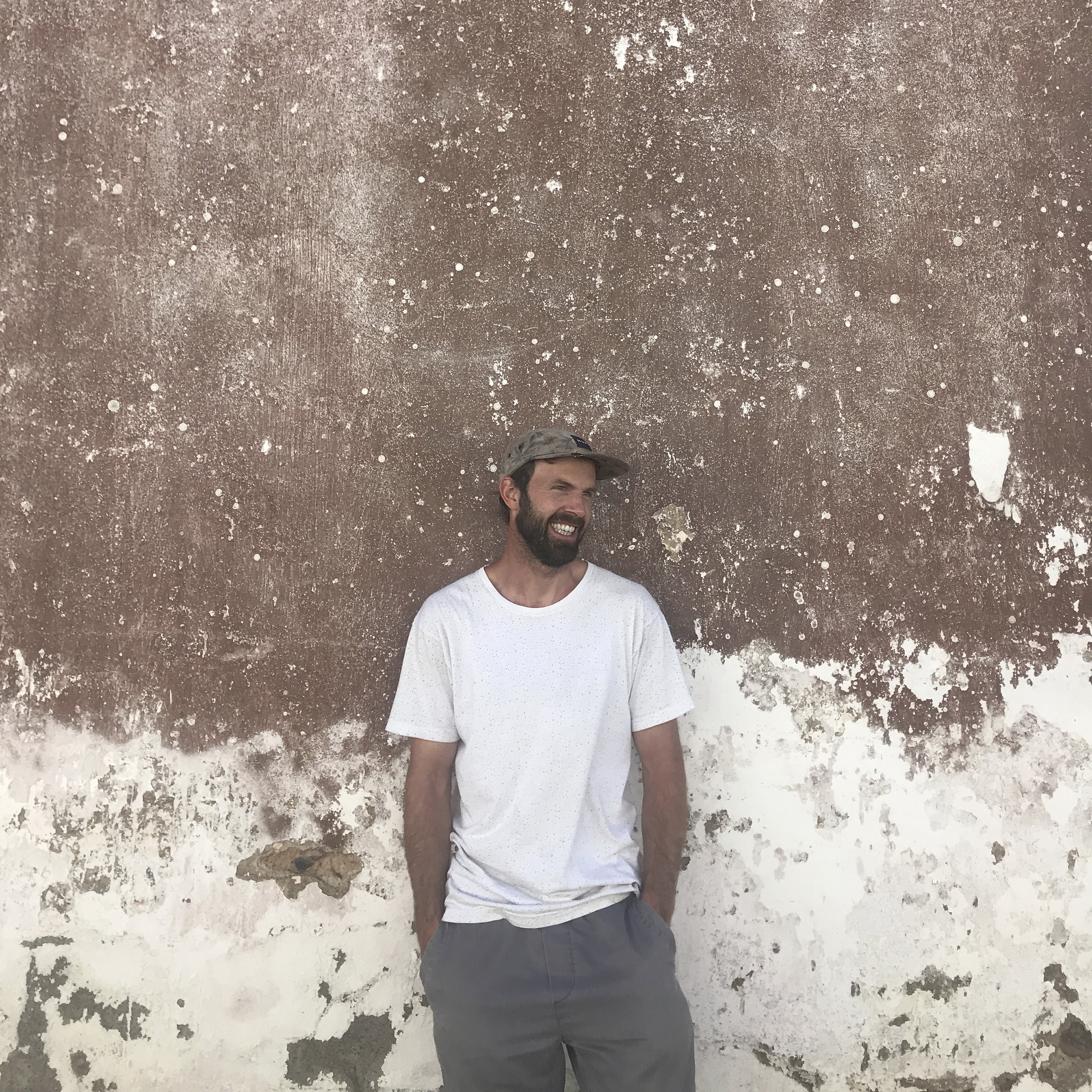
Gross in 2019

Yann Gross (born 1981) is a Swiss photographer.

== Work ==
Horizonville is a series about a village in Switzerland obsessed with American biker culture.

Kitintale is about skateboarding culture in Uganda.

The Jungle Book: Contemporary Stories of the Amazon and its Fringe "contains a collection of stories that demystify Amazonia, probing fiction and reality to both play with the perceived stereotypes and convey the contemporary lived experiences of the local inhabitants." It won the Dummy Book Award at Rencontres d'Arles in 2015.

Aya, in collaboration with Arguiñe Escandón, describes an immersion into the Amazon rainforest in Peru, following the path of Charles Kroehle, a pioneering nineteenth-century photographer.

== Publications ==
- Horizonville. ISBN 978-3-03764-105-7.
- Kitintale. ISBN 978-2-8399-0672-2.
- The Jungle Book: Contemporary Stories of the Amazon and Its Fringe.
  - English edition. Aperture Foundation, 2016. ISBN 978-1-59711-382-3.
  - French edition. Actes Sud. ISBN 978-2-330-06829-5.
  - Spanish edition. RM. ISBN 978-84-16282-66-1.
- Aya. RM. With Arguiñe Escandón. Includes vintage photographs by Charles Kroehle.
  - English edition. ISBN 978-84-17975-04-3.
  - Spanish edition. ISBN 978-84-17975-03-6.

== Group exhibitions ==
- Horizonville included in Rencontres d'Arles, Arles, France, 2011
- Aya included in Vevey festival, Switzerland, 2020
- Aya included in Grow Up, Manuel Rivera-Ortiz Foundation, Arles, France, during Rencontres d'Arles, 2023
