= Ben Brody =

American photographer

Ben Brody is an American war photographer whose work is about his country's war on terror in Iraq and Afghanistan, and its aftermath. His book Attention Servicemember includes photographs made while enlisted in the U.S. Army working in Public Affairs as a combat photographer in Iraq.

== Life and work ==
In 2002, at age 22, Brody enlisted in the U.S. Army, "not because he supported the impending invasion of Iraq [...] but because he wanted to photograph it." From 2003 to 2008, he worked in Army Public Affairs as a combat photographer in Iraq. "Brody enjoyed unique access, both physically (moving around the battle space with far greater liberty than civilian journalists were able to) and psychically (wearing the same uniform and subscribing to the same creed as his subjects)." After being discharged, between 2010 and 2018 he spent three to six months a year in Afghanistan as an embedded independent civilian photojournalist.

While in Iraq, the pictures he took were subject to censorship, and selectively edited to portray an optimistic and successful view of the war. The photos released by the Army were propaganda, often wildly at odds with the deteriorating and violent situation on the ground. Later in Afghanistan, his work was again restricted, this time implicitly through the press access and permits granted by the military.

The resulting book, Attention Servicemember (2019), was described in Huck as "using photography and storytelling to communicate the immense brutality of 21st-century warfare, and the way images can be used to sell anything, from government propaganda to vape pens."

In 2021, as the United States Armed Forces completed their withdrawal from Afghanistan, Brody worked remotely, trying to help people stuck on the ground there. His book 300m, which uses an accordion format, pairs reproduction of a WhatsApp chat with a friend and translator from this time, with photographs he made using a 360 degree panoramic toy camera while in Afghanistan. "It follows the friend's attempts to reach the entrance to Kabul's airport in the frenzy [...] It begins 300m (900ft) from the gate".

== Publications ==
- Attention Servicemember. Red Hook, 2019. ISBN 9781941703120. Photographs and text.
  - Second, expanded edition. Mass, 2020. ISBN 9781941703120.
- 300m. Mass, 2022. ISBN 9780997216349. Edition of 600 copies.
