= Willy Matheisl =

German photographer (born 1950)

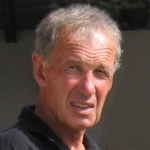

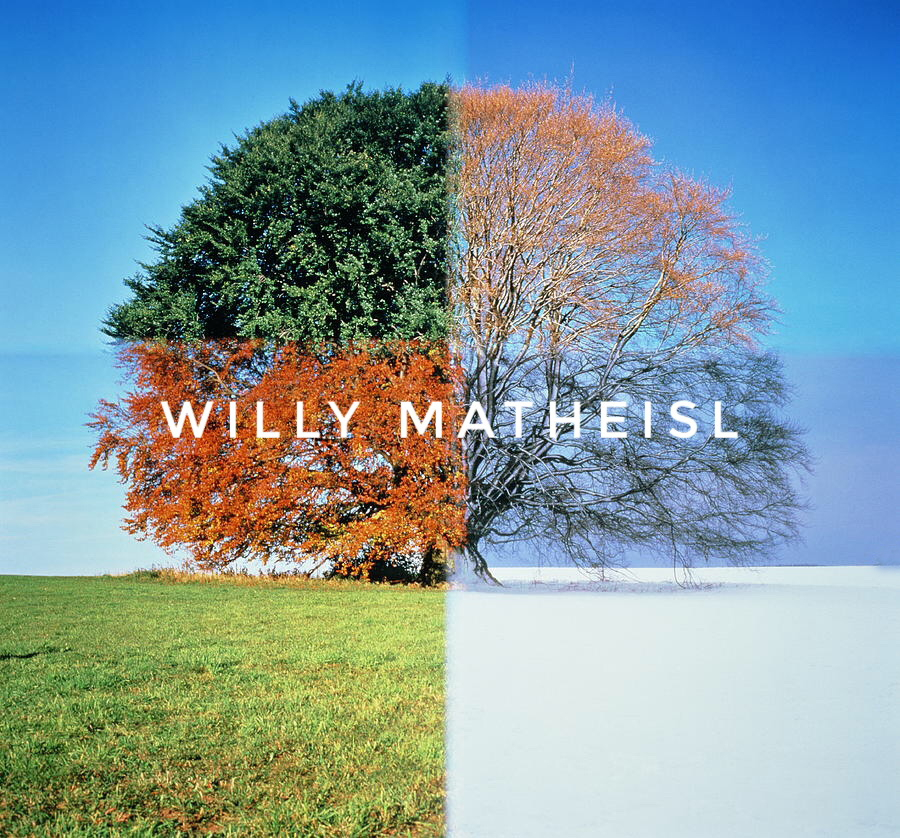

Willy Matheisl (born 1950) in Ingolstadt, Bavaria, Germany was educated in photography in the city of Zuerich, Switzerland, Europe. He was travelling the world for decades as a freelance travel photographer photographing for stock agencies and publishers. Landscape photography was very important to him and so it is no wonder that he worked with the legendary Linhof Panorama camera 6x17 using medium format roll film 6x6.

He is a photographer living in Deggendorf, Bavaria, Germany since 1985. He is the creator of a famous photo of a tree through the four seasons. The image has been used on calendars, on book covers and school books. (see external link below).
