= Alois Löcherer =

German photographer (1815-1862)

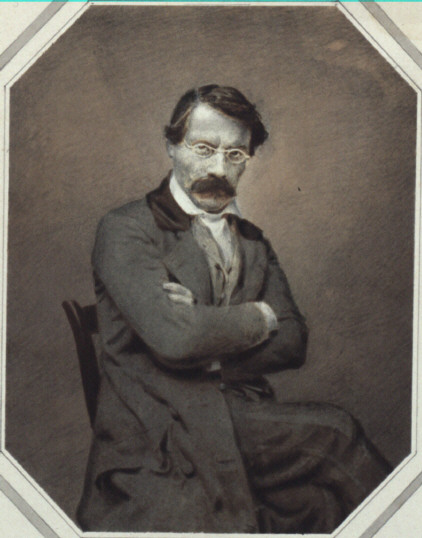
Alois Löcherer, self-portrait, around 1850

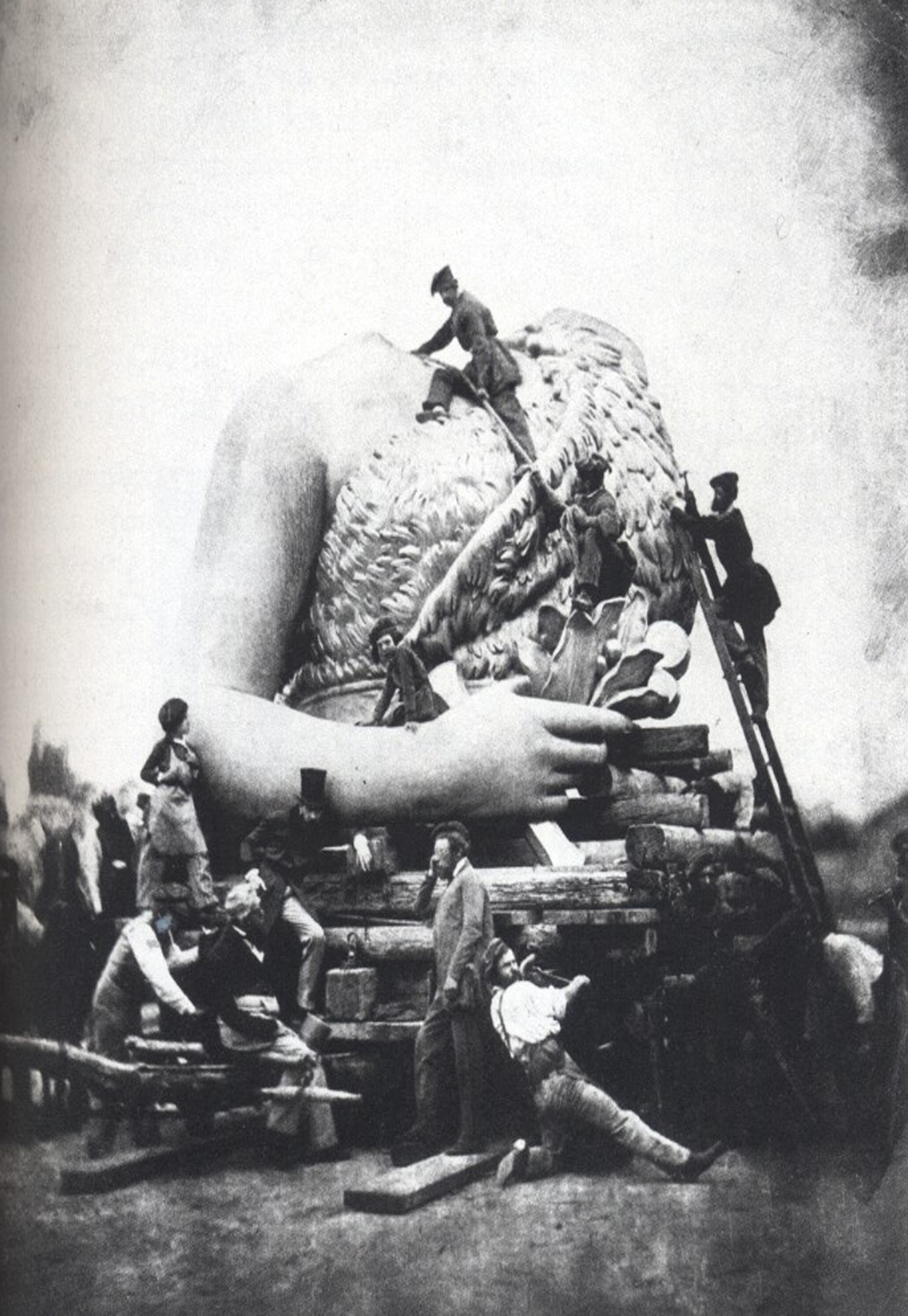
Alois Löcherer: Photo of the torso of the Bavaria statue

Alois Löcherer (14 August 1815 – 15 July 1862) was a professional German photographer active in the mid-nineteenth century.

== Biography ==
He was born in Munich, and opened a business as a photographer there in 1840, after training as a chemist and pharmacist.

== Work ==
His work consisted of daguerrotypes. It includes "The Torso Section of Bavaria, Munich" (c. 1848), which depicts the construction of the fifty-two foot tall nationalist statue "Bavaria." This image is an early example of photoreportage and is additionally noted for its surrealistic effects. He also published, together with de:Hans Hanfstaengl, Album der Zeitgenossen (Album of Contemporary Figures), a collection of portraits of current celebrities, each accompanied by a capsule biography. The work was republished in 1975. Exhibitions of his photographs were held in Cologne in 1980-81 and in Munich in 1998.
