= Kurt Lubinski =

German and Dutch author and photojournalist

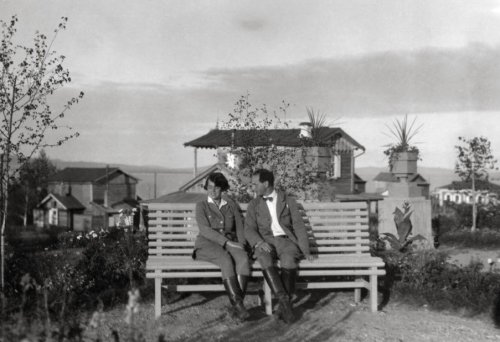
Kurt and Margot Lubinski (c. 1928)

Kurt Gottlieb Lubinski (October 19, 1899 – August 15, 1955) was a German and Dutch author and photojournalist who traveled through remote areas of the former Soviet Union and Ethiopia.

== Life and work ==
Lubinski was born in Berlin.

He worked for the Ullstein Verlag in the late 1920s, emigrated to The Netherlands in 1933 and to the United States in 1943. He worked for Dutch illustrated weeklies such as Het Leven where he was an early photojournalist who traveled through the remote areas of the former Soviet Union and Ethiopia. His unusual subject matter—people from rarely-photographed cultures, lions riding in sidecars, people behaving oddly in public places—gave him the reputation of being "among the first to acquaint the general public with images of strange cultures and exotic peoples."

He died on August 15, 1955, in New York.

== Personal life ==
He was married to photographer Margot R. Lewin-Richter in 1927 and later (in 1950) divorced. They had one son, Peter, in 1931. Margot and Peter changed their last name to Lucas when they emigrated to the US.

== Publications ==
- "Abyssinia, Land of Babel". The Living Age: 991–993. December 1927.
- Kurt Lubinski (1935). Abessinië, land en volk. Blitz.
- Kurt Lubinski (1938). This is Our World. Hodder and Stoughton.
