= Sabrina Draoui =

Algerian film director (born 1977)

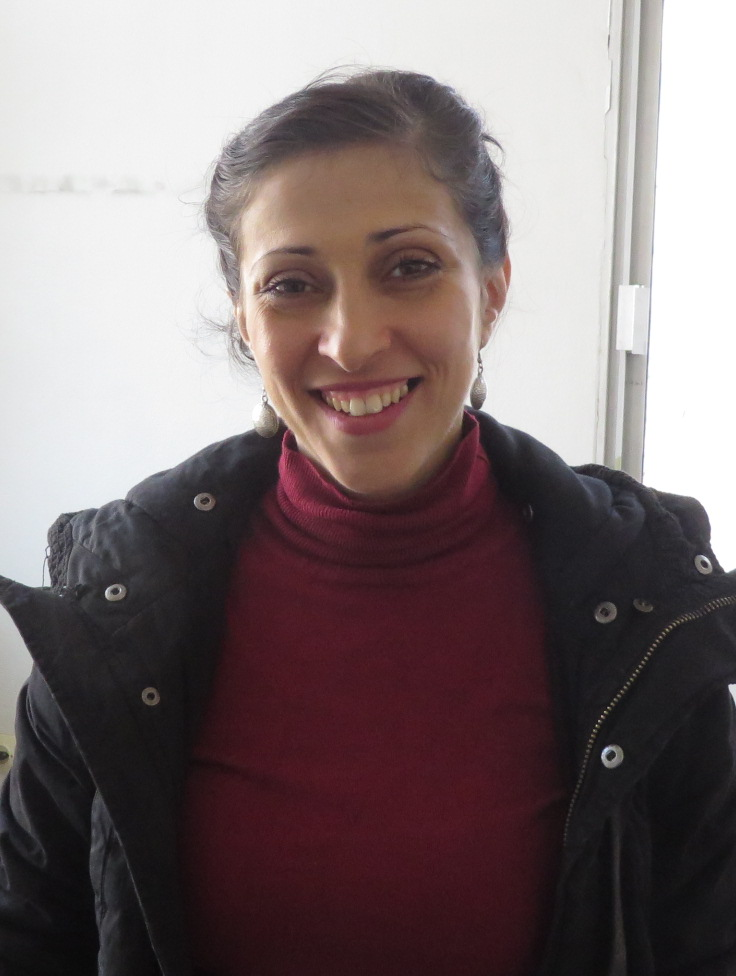
- Draoui in 2017
- Born: November 24, 1977 (age 48); Batna, Algeria
- Education: University of Science and Technology Houari Boumediene
- Occupations: Film director, photographer
- Years active: 2008-present

Sabrina Draoui (born 24 November 1977) is an Algerian film director and photographer.

== Biography ==
Draoui was born in Batna, Algeria in 1977, the daughter of an Algerian father and French mother. In 1989, she finished second in Algeria in her age group in swimming. Draoui also trained in piano and karate growing up. She graduated with a diploma in chemistry from the University of Science and Technology Houari Boumediene in 2001. Draoui supervised a group of photographers at the World University Youth Festival in August 2001. From 2001 to 2004 she was a sales representative for GROUPE VIGIL. Draoui did an internship in video editing at the Centre culturel Algiers between 2004 and 2005. She also worked as a photographer and camerawoman for KLEM Agence de Pub et Communication from 2004 to 2006. Draoui was a national winner of artistic photography competition in Algiers in 2004, and was a Euro-Mediterranean winner of the “crossed views” photo competition in 2006. In 2007, she had photography exhibitions in Algiers, Rabat, Rome, and in Alexandria.

In 2008, Draoui served as an assistant for the short films Orange Amère and Recyclage. In July 2008, she directed the film Goulili. It was selected at the Carthage Cinematographic Days in Tunis, at the Jordan Short Film Festival in Amman, and the 1st Dakar International Festival where she received her first prize, the Grand Prix (Audience Award). The film was praised for asking questions without giving definitive answers. In 2019, she was a production assistant for Inspecteur llob. Draoui directed Albert Camus et moi in 2013, as well as 50 ans, 50 femmes the same year. She directed Hada Makan in 2016, after receiving a grant from Rencontres cinématographiques de Béjaïa. The film received the prize for best documentary screenplay at the Algiers Cinematographic Days.

Draoui speaks Arabic and English.

== Filmography ==
- 2008 : Goulili (Dis-moi)
- 2009 : Le lever du jour
- 2013 : Albert Camus et moi
- 2013 : 50 ans, 50 femmes
- 2016 : Hada Makan
