= Bill Gekas =

Australian photographer

Bill Gekas (born 1973) is an Australian photographer who focuses on fine arts and portrait photography. His daughter Athena is the main focus of many of his fine art photographs.

== Life and career ==
Born in Melbourne, Gekas originally worked in the IT field and got into photography as an autodidact. In 2010, he started a project that showed his daughter on a set recreating paintings of the Old Masters. Three years later, these photographs began to attract more and more attention and have been printed in magazines, journals, newspapers and other formats from then on.

== Group exhibitions ==
- Kuala Lumpur International Photo Awards 2011–2015 KL, Malaysia (finalists exhibition)
- National Photographic Portrait Prize 2015, Canberra, Australia (finalists exhibition)
- AddOn 2012–2014, Sydney, Australia
- Fremantle Portrait Prize, Fremantle, Western Australia (finalists exhibition)

== Awards ==
- National Photographic Portrait Prize 2015 (finalist)
- International Loupe Awards 2013 (1st place portrait)
- Kuala Lumpur International Photo Awards (finalist years 2011, 2012, 2013, 2014, 2015)
- Px3 Prix De La Photographie Paris, 2014 (Gold Award)
