= Susan Bank =

American photographer (born 1938)

- Born: Susan Sweetster; 1938 (age 86–87); Portsmouth, New Hampshire, U.S.
- Occupation: Photographer
- Years active: 1998
- Known for: Piercing the Darkness

Susan Bank (née Sweetster; born 1938) is an American photographer, and painter.

As a documentary photographer, she is known for photos she took on regular trips to Cuba. Born in Portsmouth, New Hampshire, she did not take up photography until the age of 60. She studied photography under Mary Ellen Mark and Constantine Manos.

== Collections ==
Her work is included in the collection of the Museum of Fine Arts, Houston, the Lehigh University Art Galleries Permanent Collection and the James A. Michener Museum of Art.

== Bibliography ==
- Cuba: Campo Adentro. Sagamore Press, 2008 ISBN 978-0615205953
- Piercing the Darkness. La Fabrica, 2012 ISBN 978-8415303909
