= Hugh Grannum =

American photographer, photojournalist, and short film maker

Hugh Grannum (1941–2013) was an American photographer, photojournalist, and short film maker. He was inducted into the Michigan Journalism Hall of Fame in 2013.

Grannum's works have been displayed in various magazines and galleries such as Forbes, Ebony, Essence, Jet magazine, Black Enterprise, Michigan 24/7.

== Biography ==
Grannum was born in 1941. He died on Jan 11, 2013 at the age of 72. By 2013, he'd spent 37 years taking "photographs that captured the heart and soul of Detroit and its people."
