= Vincenzo Laera =

Italian photographer (born 1966)

- Born: Vincenzo Laera; 1966 (age 59–60); Milan, Italy
- Known for: Art, Portrait, Fashion
- Website: vincenzolaera.com

Vincenzo Laera (born 1966) is an Italian photographer.

== Life and work ==
Vincenzo Laera began his creative career in the 1980s in the fashion industry of his hometown of Milan. Trained as a hair stylist, he began working as a freelancer for magazines such as Lei and Per Lui early on and collaborated regularly with South African photographer Koto Bolofo. In the late 1980s, Laera, just 20 years old, became a member of Helmut Newton's team. 1989 he moved to New York City. Till 2005 Laera collaborated on projects with Newton and photographers like Albert Watson, Irving Penn, Brigitte Lacombe, Deborah Tuberville, Bert Stern, Greg Gorman, and Annie Leibovitz. During this time, Laera began to work on his own photography. In 2006, when he moved to Berlin, he became self-employed as a professional photographer. Laera worked for magazines like Icon, GQ, Spiegel, InStyle or Kaltblut. Laera's photography is dedicated to the exploration of the male body, beauty, and eros. It reflects the experiences he has made with the icons of fashion photography. His work is also influenced by the black-and-white aesthetic that photographers such as Bruce Weber or Herb Ritts established in the 1980s and 1990s. At the same time, Laera's work is determined by the intensive examination of art and cultural history. Raised in a Catholic family, his work references the traditions of Christian iconography, Italian Renaissance and early Baroque art. At the same time, Laera refers to the formal compositions of classical nude photography and the " Neues Sehen", the "New Vision" in the photography of the 1920s. His experiments with light and shadow emphasize the sculptural aspect of the body and the connection with its architectural surroundings. Many of Laera's series oscillate between documentation and staging, control and spontaneity. They also question the boundaries between subject and object. Laera, who often accompanies his models over a long period of time, arranges them in strict formal compositions, often like sculptures in space, and models them with light. He juxtaposes these images with spontaneous shots that also focus on the pictorial composition but underline the vulnerability and individuality of his counterpart in front of the camera.
