= Marion E. Warren =

American photographer

Marion Edwin Warren (June 18, 1920 – September 8, 2006) was an American photographer, best known for his black-and-white photographs of the Chesapeake Bay and its Maryland surroundings. His work appeared in Fortune, Life, Time, National Geographic and Sports Illustrated.
