= Vytautas Stanionis =

Lithuanian photographer

Vytautas Stanionis: Fotografios/Photographs, a posthumous collection of Stanionis's Lithuanian work.

Vytautas Stanionis (27 February 1917 – 11 May 1966) was a Lithuanian photographer of Lithuania and Ukraine during the Soviet period.

Born in Drisa on 27 February 1917, Stanionis was brought up in Kaunas. His mother died when he was young; his father then remarried but he too died when Stanionis was only 16. Stanionis trained and worked as an accountant. He moved to Vilnius in 1940, but three years later became ill and was hospitalized for tuberculosis in Alytus. Stanionis married soon after the war, both working as an accountant and being treated in the hospital, and taking photographs in his spare time.

When in 1946 the new internal Soviet passports required photographs of their bearers, Stanionis was authorized to take them. A white sheet was a sufficient backdrop, and Stanionis would often photograph two people together in order to reduce costs. A number of these photographs (uncut) survive. Stanionis would also take any other photographs on demand; some survive of Lithuanian partisans. In 1947 he got a job in a regional newspaper, and was a popular photographer, although his work was hindered by his poor health. Photographs recently exhibited and republished show people more or less stiffly standing or sitting for photographs they had requested, plus Soviet rallies and rituals (some with floats eerily reminiscent of demonstrations of US civic pride), the river Nemunas (particularly in flood), and people unselfconsciously going about their business.

The strain worsened Stanionis's health, and he went briefly to the Crimea in the hope of recuperating. His health soon deteriorated again after his return to Alytus, and in 1960 he went again to Crimea, this time to the resort of Sosniak. Here he was able to become photographer for the Nikitsky Botanical Garden; his botanical work was exhibited in Yalta, Kiev and Moscow.

Stanionis died in Yalta on 11 May 1966.

Stanionis's elder son, Vytautas V. Stanionis, would later become a professional photographer and the editor of his father's work.

== Publications ==
- Stanionis, Vytautas. Dainų šventė. Vilnius, 1958.
- Stanionis, Vytautas. Nemuno vingiuose (In the bends of the Nemunas). Vilnius, 1959.
- Stanionis, Vytautas. Alytus. Alytus, 1960.
- Stanionis, Vytautas. Žuvintas. Vilnius, 1961.
- Stanionis, Vytautas. Nikitskij Botanicheskij sad (Nikitsky Botanical Garden). Moscow, 1962.
- Stanionis, Vytautas, and V. Narkevičiūtė. Nikitskij Botanicheskij sad (Nikitsky Botanical Garden). Simferopol, 1967.
- Pokario Dzūkija (Postwar Dzūkija), Vilnius, 1990.
- Stanionis, Vytautas V., ed. Vytautas Stanionis: Fotografios/Photographs 1945–1959. N.p.: Baltos lankos, 2002. ISBN 9955-429-95-X (Text in Lithuanian and English.)
- Stanionis, Vytautas V., ed. Nuotraukos dokumentams / Photographs for Documents. Kaunas: Kaunas Photography Gallery, 2014. ISBN 978-609-8099-04-1. (Text in Lithuanian and English.)
