= Imre Kinszki =

Hungarian photographer

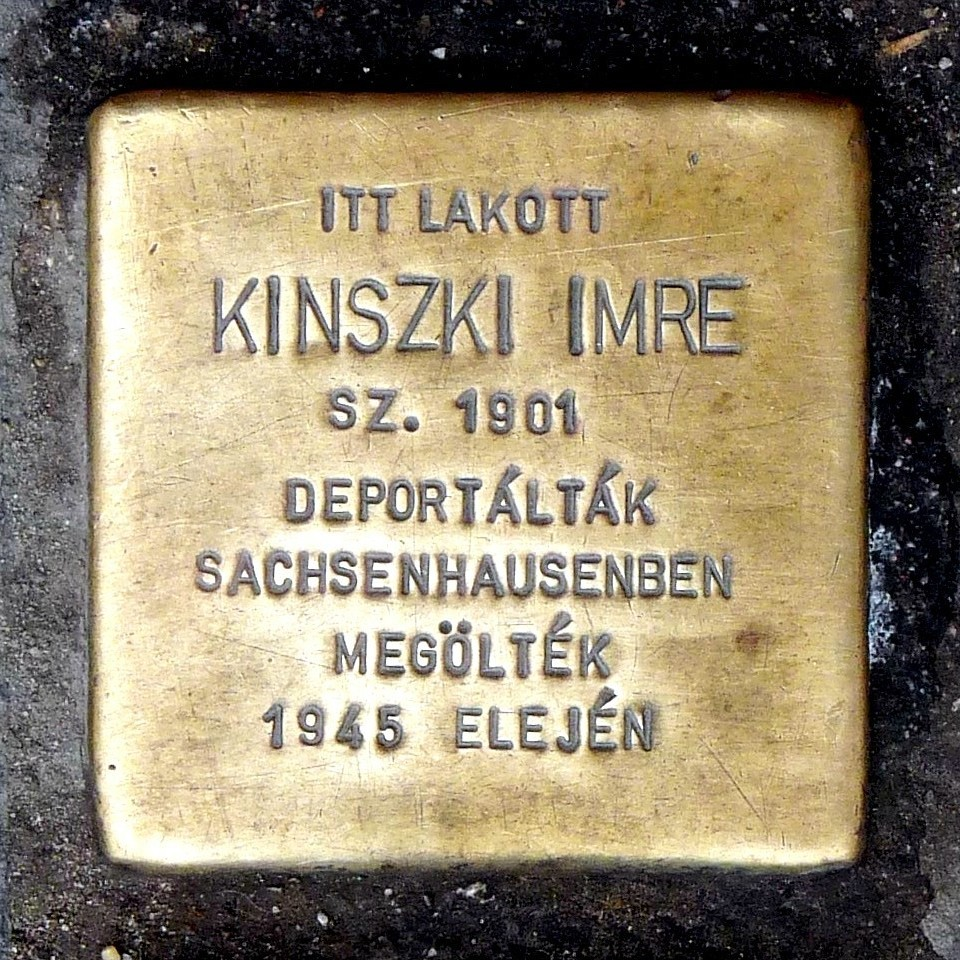
Stolperstein in memory of Mr. Imre Kinszki (1901–1945), at the entrance of his former domicile. (Budapest, District XIV, Róna Street Nr 121)

Imre Kinszki (1901–1945) was a Jewish-Hungarian photographer.

== Biography ==
Imre Kinszki was born in Budapest, Hungary in 1901. He captured motion and speed, architecture, and city life. In 1937, together with Erno Vadas and Gusztáv Seiden, he co-founded the Modern Hungarian Photographers Group. His photographs and articles appeared in American Photography and National Geographic. The KINSECTA camera was invented by Kinszki to improve on the technique of close-up photography.

In 1943, during the Second World War, he was sent to forced labor camps in Romania and Hungary. He died on the way to Sachsenhausen concentration camp in 1945.
