= Dominic Rouse =

Dominic Hugh Peter Rouse (born 15 August 1959) is an English photographer and visual artist whose career has included photojournalism, advertising, commercial and fine art photography. He is an early practitioner of digital photography.

== Career ==
He is known for producing large format silver prints from digitally composed negatives.

His more recent commercial works were made using a computer without the use of a camera and are generally exhibited as contemporary pop street/urban art.

He has been described by America's Black & White Magazine as a "master of digital manipulation" and his black and white silver prints were lauded by the editor of the British Journal of Photography as "masterpieces" when 'Haunted by a Painter's Ghost' was exhibited in London.
