= Nick Meyer (photographer) =

American photographer (born 1981)

Nick Meyer (born 1981) is an American photographer, living in Western Massachusetts.

== Life and work ==
Meyer received a BFA from Massachusetts College of Art and Design in Boston in 2005, and an MFA from California College of the Arts in Oakland in 2008.

His book The Local was made in his home town of Greenfield, Massachusetts in New England and highlights issues with addiction, housing insecurity and small-town decline in America.

== Publications ==
- Pattern Language. Brick, 2010. ISBN 978-0984362004. With an introduction by Melissa Febos.
- Either Limits or Contradictions. Daylight, 2016. ISBN 9781942084341. With a foreword by Aaron Schuman and contributions by Lawrence Ferlinghetti.
- The Common. 2018. Zine. Edition of 500 copies.
- Good Bones. 2020.
- Obvious Children. 2020. Edition of 50 copies.
- The Local. London: Mack, 2021. ISBN 978-1-912339-90-7.
