= Jayanth Sharma =

Wildlife photographer

- Born: 6 May 1980 (age 46); Mysore, India
- Occupation: Wildlife photographer
- Website: www.jayanthsharma.com

Jayanth Sharma is an Indian wildlife photographer.

== Life and work ==
Sharma was born on 6 May 1980 in Mysore to Nagaraja Sharma, a historian and photographer. He learned photography from his father. Prior to entering photography, Sharma worked in the information technology field.

He has photographed in Africa, Antarctica, Norway, and India. He has written about travel and photography for The Asian Age, Outlook India and Deccan Chronicle. In 2010, Sharma founded "Toehold", a photography and travel company that provides mentorship by photographers. In 2018, he partnered with Amazon India to take online photography classes under the program named "Shutterbug".

== Awards ==
- 2018: DJ Memorial photography award, Wildlife category.

== Gallery ==
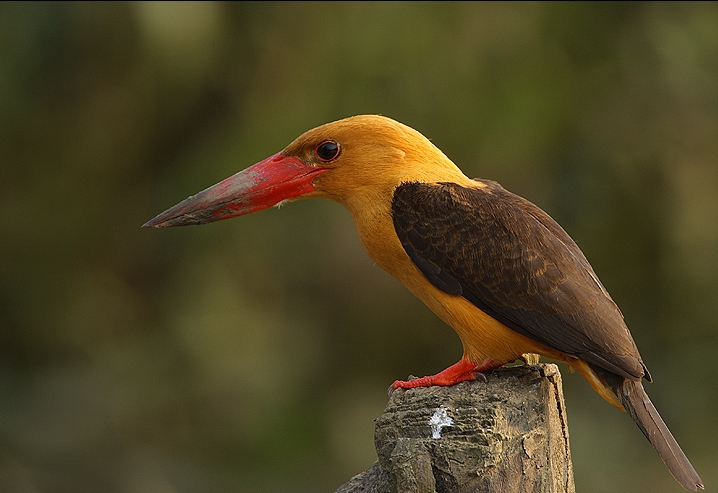
Brown winged

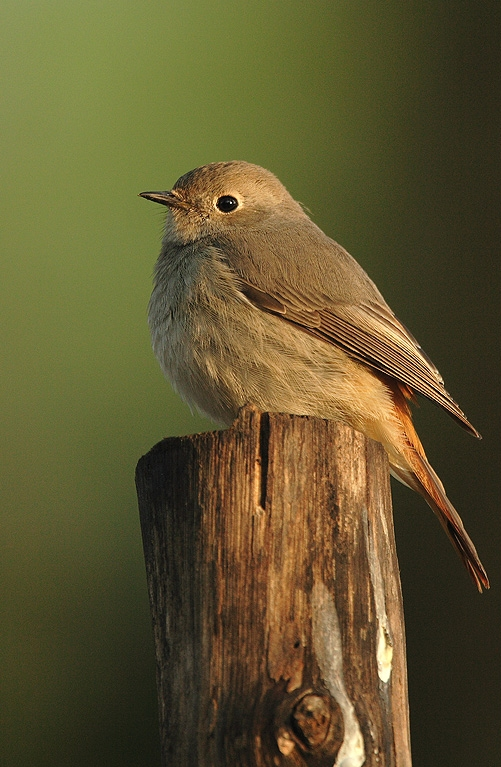
Hodgsons redstart
