= Peter Bainbridge (silkscreen artist) =

Australian fashion photographer

- Born: Peter Bainbridge; Melbourne, Australia
- Citizenship: Australian
- Occupation: Silkscreen Artist
- Years active: 2008– present
- Known for: Silkscreen prints
- Spouse: Rose Borg

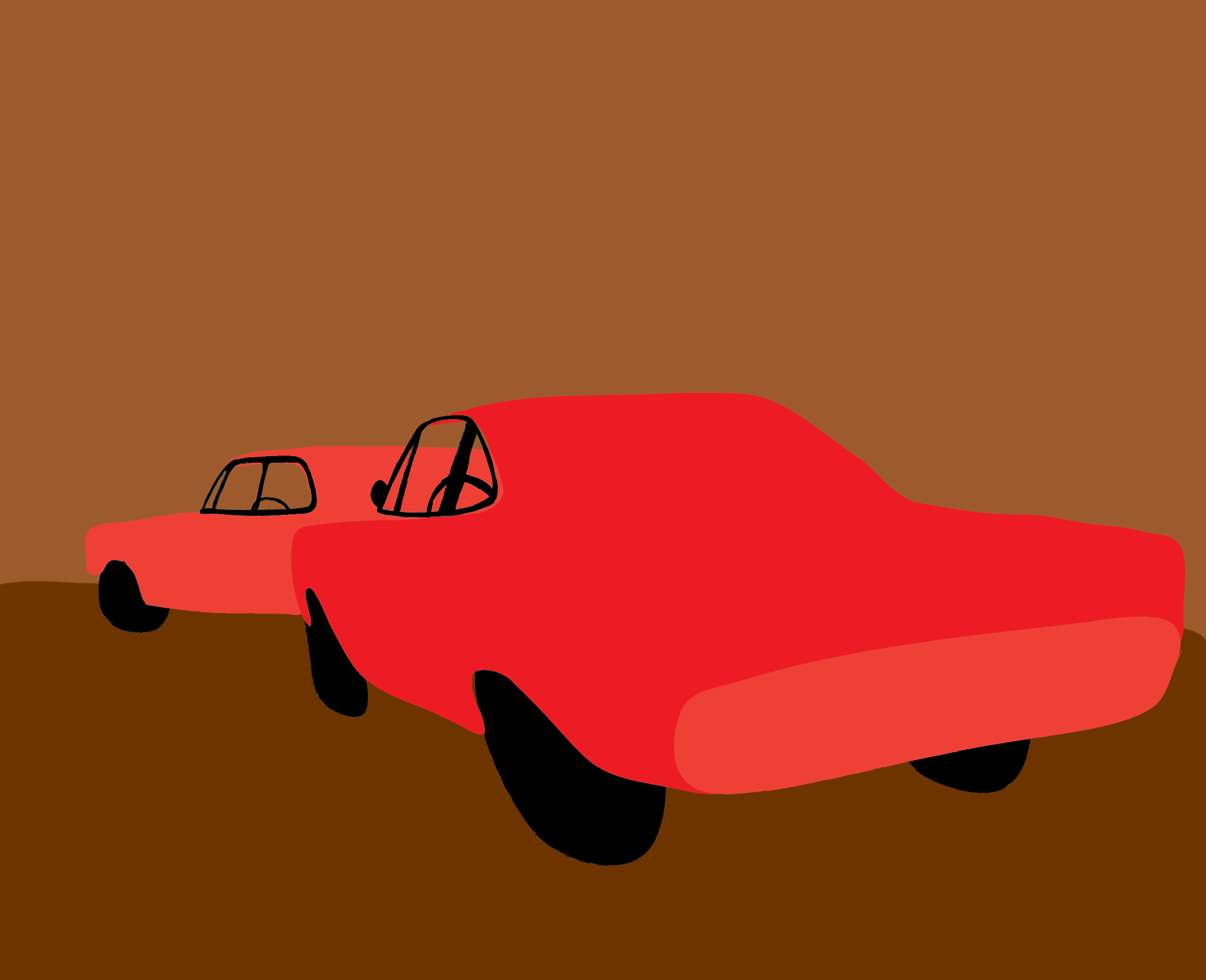

"Girls with Black Chefs Hats" by Peter Bainbridge

Peter Bainbridge (born 1957 in Melbourne) is a silkscreen artist. He was a clothing artist Illustrator during the 80-90's and became a fashion photographer until 2009. He then published his own fashion arts broadsheet magazine in 2010 which the Sydney Morning Herald asked him to partner after seeing the first issue. He has exhibited his clothes and knitwear together with partner Rose Borg at the Victoria and Albert Museum in London, America and Japan. He was commissioned by the National Gallery in Canberra and the Powerhouse Museum in Sydney for their permanent collections. Peter started shooting fashion in 1994, and owned and operated Bluefish Hire Studio in Darlinghurst together with Rose Borg. The New South Wales state library has purchased peters silkscreen work. And is currently the fashion illustrator at Australian.New Zealand's Harper's Bazaar
