= Charles T. Scowen =

19th century British photographer

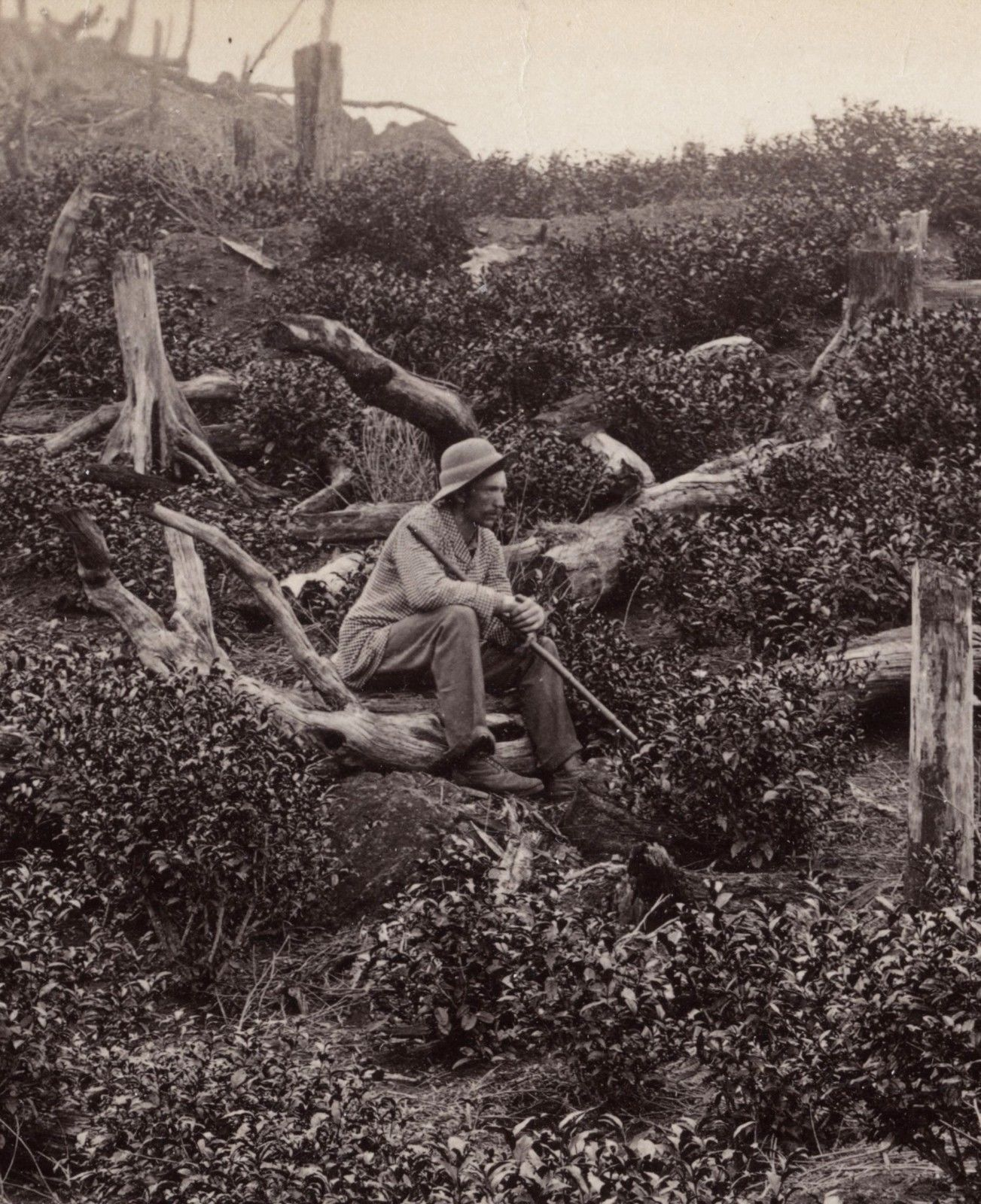
Self-portrait, circa 1880.

Charles Thomas Scowen (11 March 1852 – 24 November 1948) was a British photographer during the nineteenth century. He was active as a photographer from 1871 to 1890, working in Sri Lanka and British India in the early 1870s. By 1876 Scowen had established a studio, Scowen & Co, in Kandy and by the 1890s, he had opened a second in Colombo. His work, which included landscapes and portraits of Malay women, is noted for its lighting, technically superior printing, and strong compositional qualities.

Scowen's photographs are represented in the collections of the J. Paul Getty Museum, Yale University Art Gallery, the Art Institute of Chicago, the Metropolitan Museum of Art, Museum of Fine Arts, Boston, and the Lanckoroński’s Archive Photography of the Polish Academy of Arts and Sciences.

He became a tea planter before retiring and returning to England around the turn of the century. He died in Sudbury, Suffolk, aged 96.

== Gallery ==
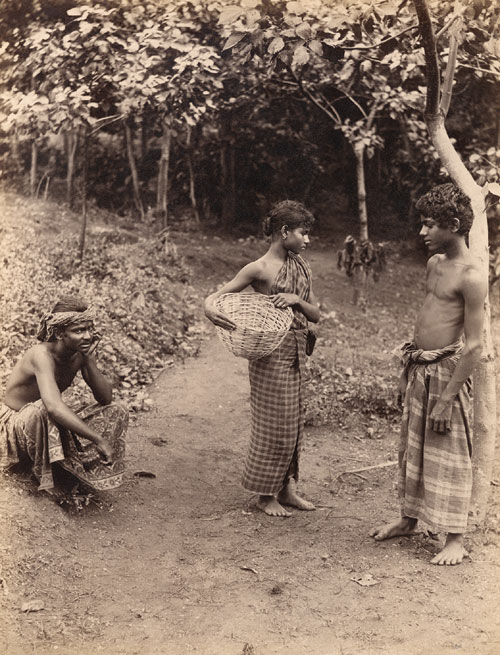
People in Ceylon, c. 1870s

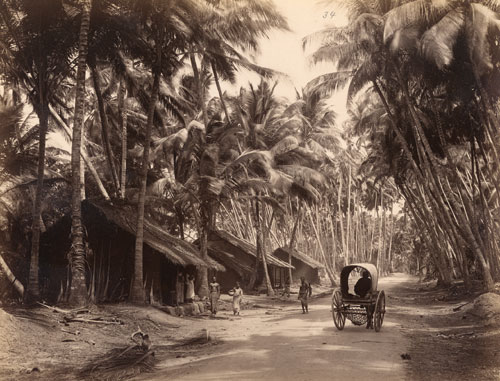
Landscape in Ceylon, c. 1870s

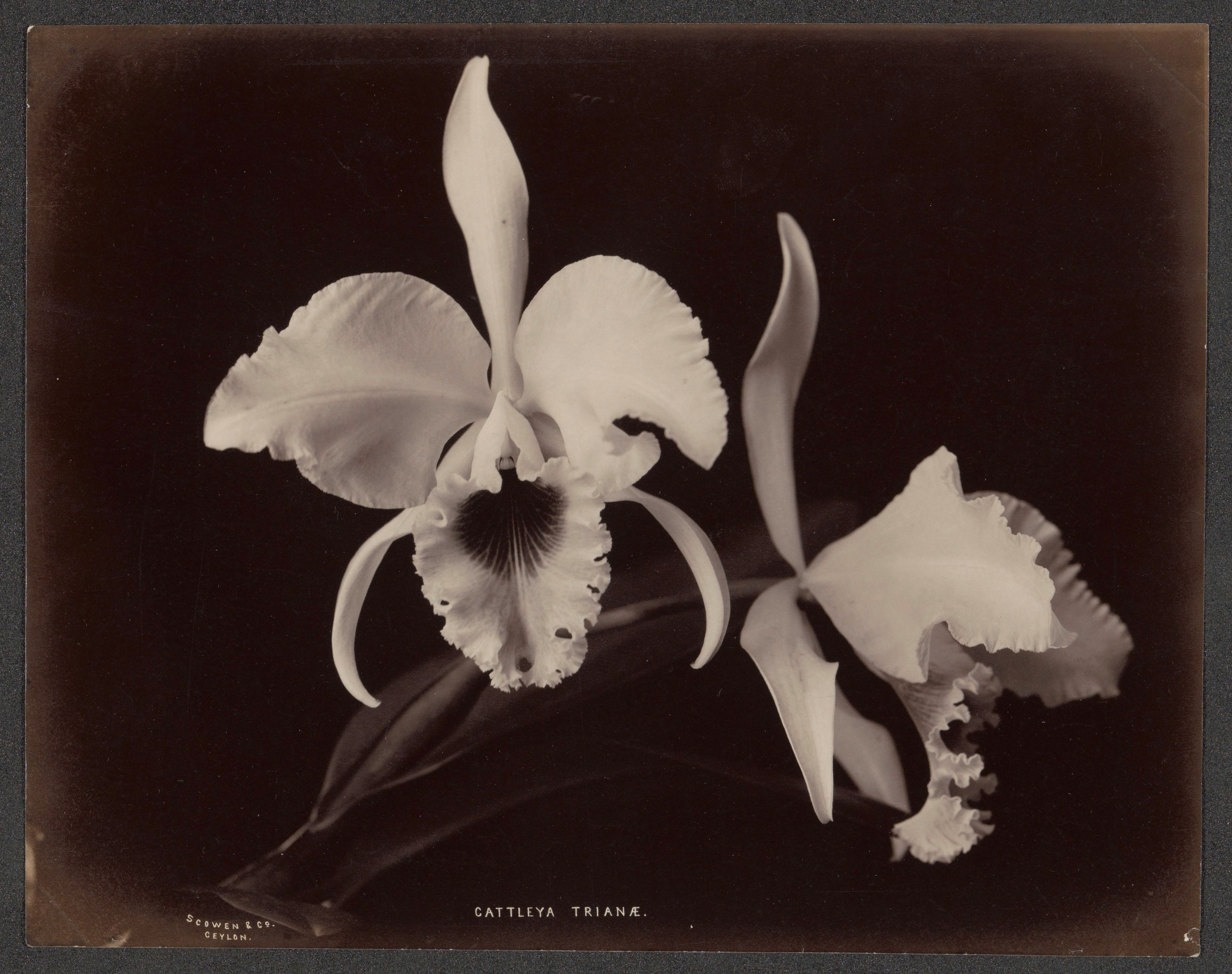
OrchideeCattleya Trianae, Ceylon, 1870s

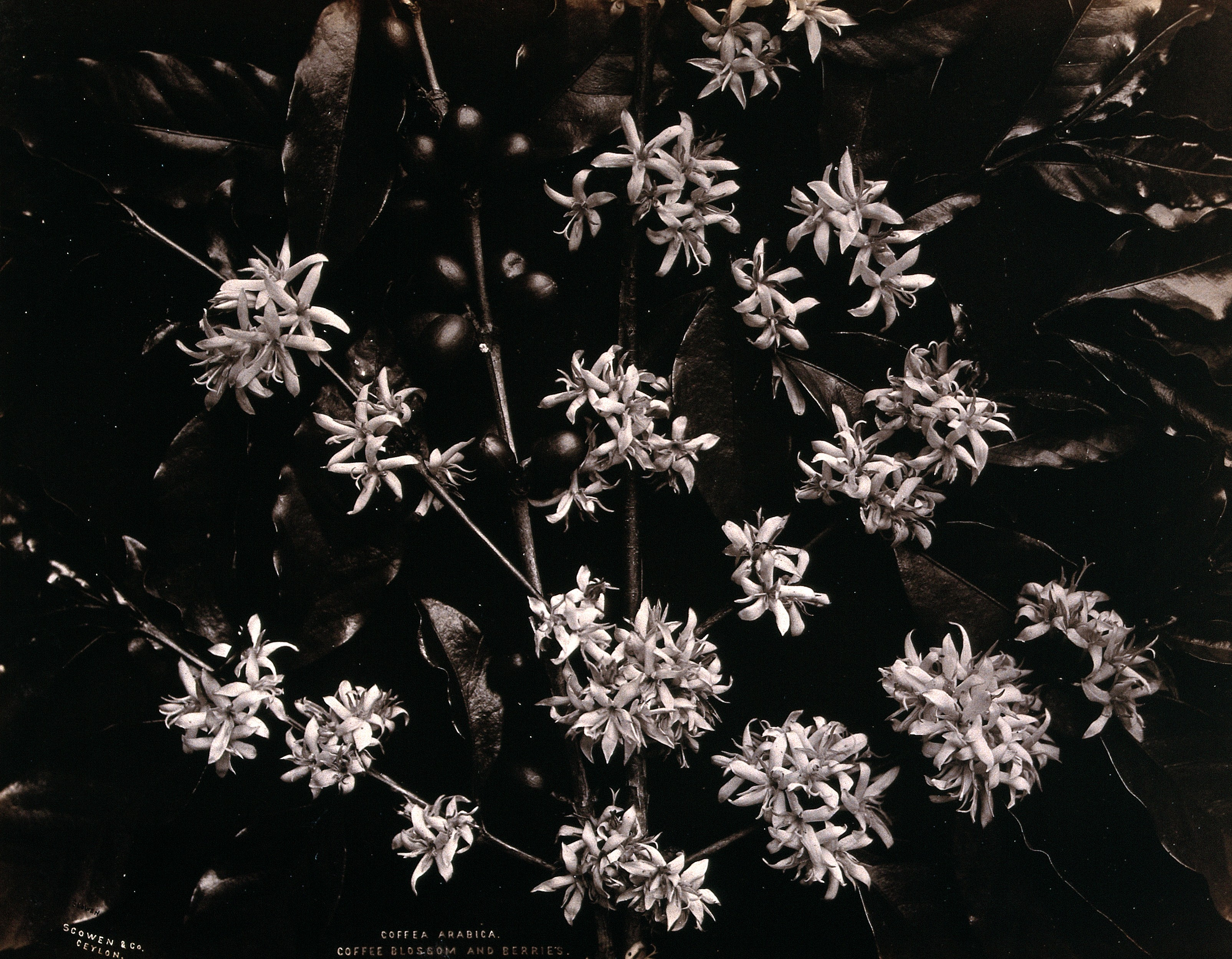
The blossom and fruit of a coffee tree (Coffea arabica). Photograph by Scowen and company.

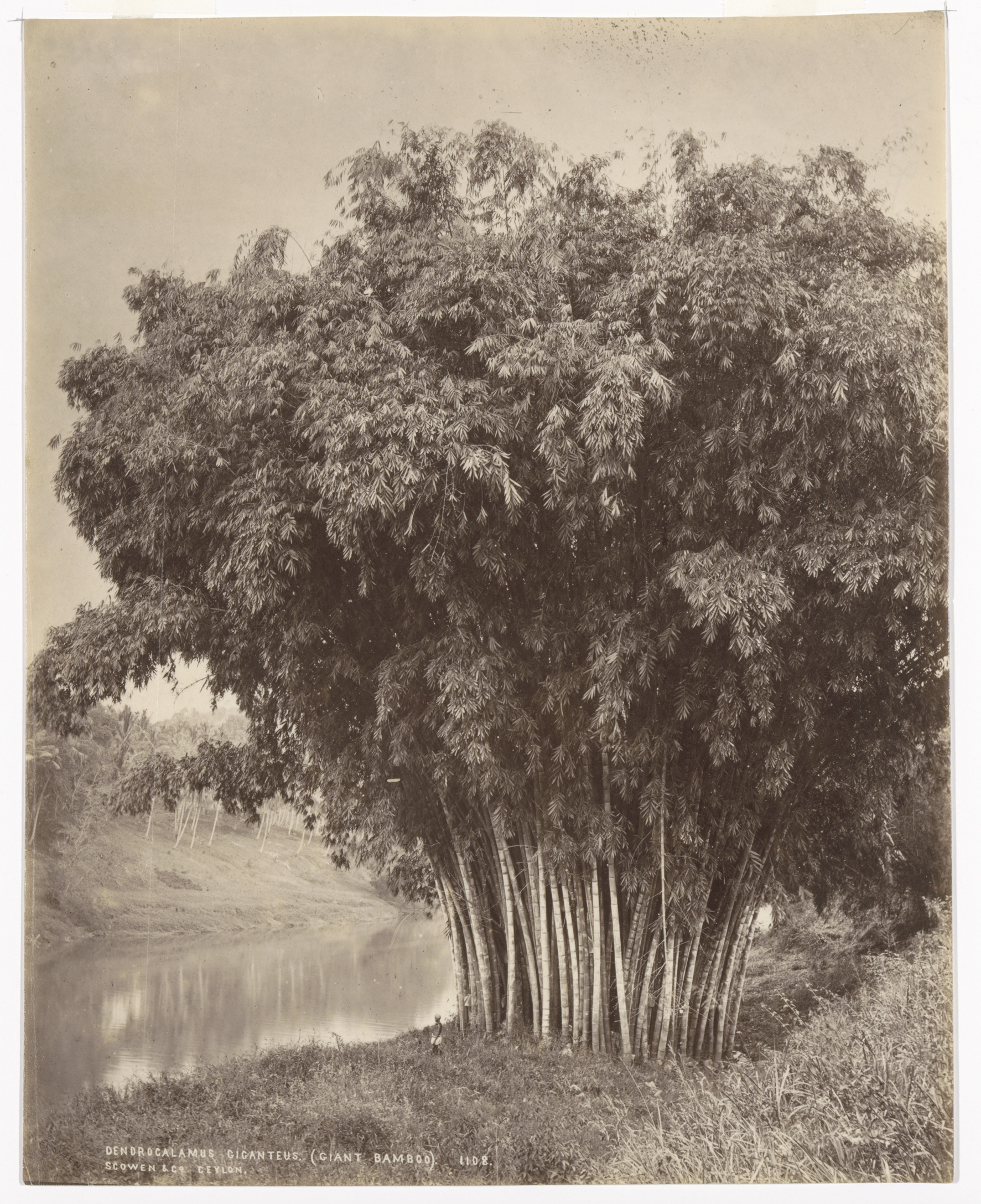
Giant Bamboo, Ceylon c. 1875–1880
