= Šechtl =

Šechtl is a surname. Notable people with the surname include:

- Ignác Šechtl (1840–1911), pioneer of Czech photography (especially photojournalism) and cinematography
- Josef Jindřich Šechtl (1877–1954), Czech photographer who specialized in photojournalism and portrait photography

== See also ==
- Šechtl and Voseček, photographic studio founded in Tábor (Bohemia) in 1888 by Ignác Šechtl, and assistant Jan Voseček
