= Josef Jindřich Šechtl =

Czech photographer (1877–1954)

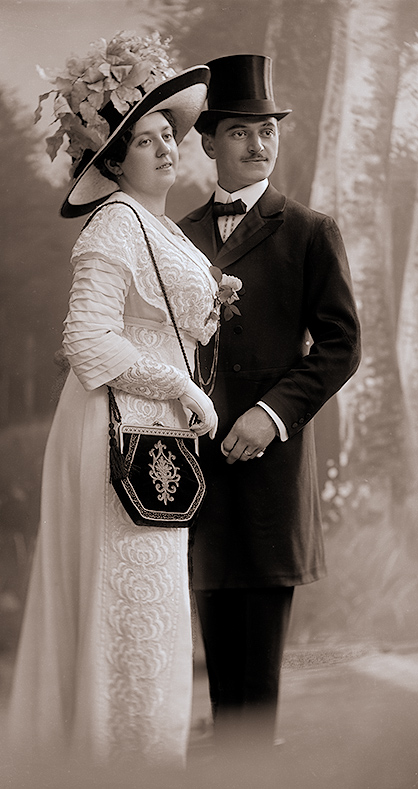
Josef Jindřich Šechtl and wife Anna, 1911

Josef Jindřich Šechtl (9 May 1877 – 24 February 1954) was a Czech photographer who specialized in photojournalism and portrait photography. On the death of his father, photographer Ignác Šechtl, Josef inherited the photographic studios of Šechtl & Voseček.

== Early years ==
Josef Jindřich Šechtl was born in Tábor, South Bohemia, on 9 May 1877, as the second of three children. His father, Ignác Šechtl, had opened his photographic studio in Tábor in 1876, and thus Josef Jindřich was influenced by photography from his childhood.

After finishing lower high school in Tábor, the boy was particularly interested in chemigraphy (a method of printing photographs). In 1891 (at the age of 14) he started to work as a trainee in the polygraphic factory of Jan Vilím in Prague. After two years, in 1893, he changed jobs to work as a photographer in the studio of František Krátký in Kolín. Krátký's studio specialized in stereoscopy and publishing photographs as educational tools, allowing Josef Jindřich to further develop his interests in photographic printing. His certificate of a completed apprenticeship, written in 1906 by his father Ignác Šechtl, also certifies his studies in the Šechtl & Voseček studios in the period 1892–1895, apparently in parallel with his jobs in Prague and Kolín. At 22, after serving in the army (1898–1899), he started work in the affiliated Šechtl & Voseček studio in Černovice u Tábora, a town near Tábor. At this time his father Ignác was travelling with his cinematograph (motion pictures), and the Tábor studio was run by Ignác's partner Jan Voseček.

== Photographic career ==
Josef Jindřich Šechtl had a wide variety of interests in photography, including portrait photography, photojournalism, documenting changes in the town of Tábor, photography of architecture, film, color photography using the Autochrome process, street photography using an early Leica camera, and fine art photography influenced by photographic pictorialism (including use of the bromoil process).

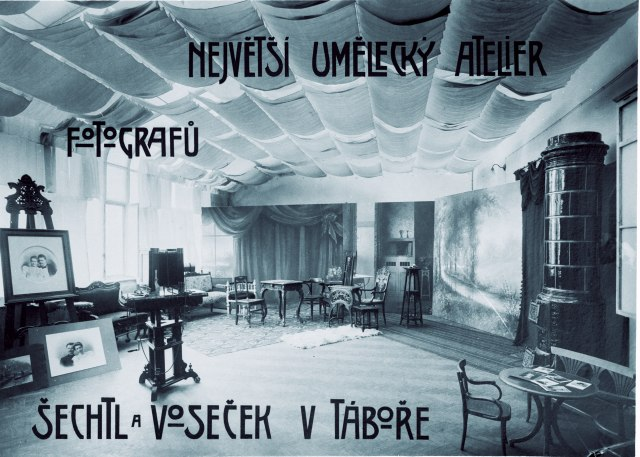
Contemporary advertisement picturing the new studio and reading "The largest art studio of photographers Šechtl and Voseček in Tábor". The studio was often described as the largest in South Bohemia or the Czech countryside.

Since the photographs from the Šechtl & Voseček studio are not usually signed by the particular photographer, it is not clear which photographs taken during 1897–1911 were taken by Josef Jindřich or Ignác Šechtl. Josef Jindřich's influence on the work of studio is however apparent. Soon after the start of his career, the studio started to publish large photo essays on important events, and produced postcards signed Šechtl & Voseček. The earliest of these larger photo essays — from an exhibition in Sedlčany, the Sokol gymnastic festival (Slet), or the arrival of Austrian Emperor Franz Joseph I — contained about twenty photographs each. The essays however quickly grew larger, and the Regional Exhibition in Tábor in 1902 was recorded in over 100 photographs.

The main source of income for the studio however remained its studio work, in which Josef Jindřich excelled: despite the provincial location of the studio, his works were comparable with those of the best Czech portrait studios. His work is influenced by photographic pictorialism. He used various visual aids and decorations to help express the personality of his subjects, often with a gentle sense of humor. His skilful use of light and contrast with shadows achieved stunning visual effects.

Josef Jindřich Šechtl became a partner in the Šechtl & Voseček studio in 1904 and took complete control in 1911 after the death of his father. Under his lead the studio prospered, and in 1906 he opened an affiliated studio in Pelhřimov, while the studio also participated in the Imperial Austrian Exhibition in London. In 1907, a new and modern studio was built on the main street of Tábor.

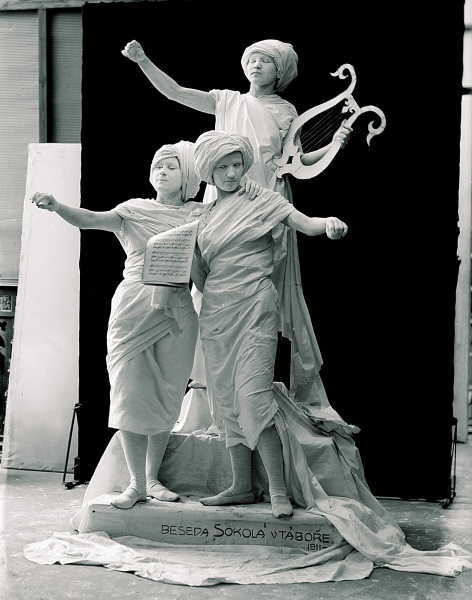
Live statue of poetry, 1911, arranged for the Czech Sokol movement with sculptor Jan Vítězslav Dušek.

The photographic work of Josef Jindřich was very much influenced by Anna Stocká, whom he married in 1911. Anna loved art, and thanks to her charm the family befriended several artists living in Tábor, in particular the sculptor Jan Vítězslav Dušek. In 1912 Josef Jindřich and Anna's daughter Ludmila was born, and all seemed well. Josef Jindřich didn't serve in the army during World War I, and thus had a chance to record life in Tábor during this period, including the fire that significantly damaged the Tábor studio in 1917. He recorded the fire in a unique photo-essay, with several snapshots made on small-format sheet film, and for a record, a "reconstructed scene" made afterwards as an exact reconstruction of one of the snapshots, on a 13×18 cm glass plate negative.

Much more disastrous for his life than the fire was the death of Anna from a kidney disorder in 1925 just six months after, and precipitated by, the birth of their son, Josef Ferdinand Ignác. His second marriage, to teacher Božena Bulínová, in 1926, wasn't as happy; and Josef Jindřich began to concentrate more on work in the studio and less on family life.

In 1928 Josef Jindřich bought a Leica camera and started recording life on 35mm film. His collected work on 35mm much of it for the illustrated weekly Pestrý týden, gives an interesting insight into the daily life of the photographer, his vacations in Jáchymov and Yugoslavia, and his trip to the Olympic Games in Berlin in 1936 with his friend the sculptor Jan Vítězslav Dušek, as well as events of the Second World War and the early years of communist Czechoslovakia.

During the life of Josef Jindřich, photography changed from a job that could be taken up and practised fairly freely to a regulated craft: first for portrait photography in 1911, and later in 1926 (despite the protests of many amateur photographers) it was declared a full-scale craft, requiring apprenticeship and a permit to practice. In 1948, the new communist government socialised all services, including photographic studios. The Šechtl & Voseček studio was turned into a syndicate and nationalized in 1951 and, as a former tradesman, Josef Jindřich Šechtl was granted a small pension (200 Kčs per month).

Josef Jindřich Šechtl died in Tábor on 24 February 1954, aged 76.

=== Fine art photography ===
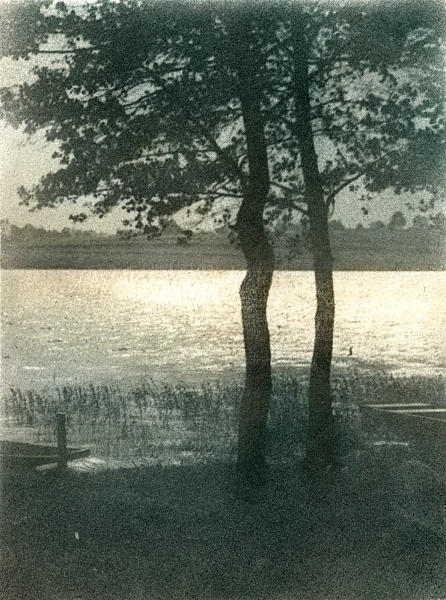
Bromoil, 1920s

The Šechtl & Voseček studios were advertised as artistic studios with a special focus on portraits of women and children. Josef Jindřich Šechtl did a number of works in fine art photography; however, most of these photographic prints either have been lost or are in private collections. Many of his architectural photographs have a great artistic quality, in particular those of the old town of Tábor, and his booklet Kutná Hora on that town.

He was among the few professional photographers in the Bohemia experimenting successfully with the bromoil process and Autochrome processes.

=== Photo essays ===
Josef Jindřich Šechtl did most of his work in the limits of the Tábor region of southern Bohemia. However, within these limits, he captured a number of important historical events, and portrayed in great detail life in the Czech countryside. A number of his photo essays have been preserved, either on glass plate negatives or on nitrate films. Until 1911 the photo essays were done in collaboration with his father, Ignác Šechtl, and until the 1930s, with Jan Voseček.

Josef Jindřich Šechtl was, from 1927, among the first photographers in Czechoslovakia to use the Leica 35mm film camera.

Selected photo essays preserved in the archive:

Year	
1901	Vaulting over horse at a Sokol gathering, Prague, 1901 Arrival in Tábor of Austrian Emperor Franz Joseph I, Fourth Sokol Gathering in Prague.
1902	Regional Exhibition in Tábor,
1902–1903	Construction of the first electric railway from Tábor to Bechyně with inventor František Křižík. This photo essay led to later collaboration with Křižík's company.
1917	Rhythmic - modern open air dancing of Sokol. Sokol was banned during World War I.
1918	TGM leaving train in Tábor. Arrival of President of Czechoslovakia Tomáš G Masaryk after WWI, one of the first photographs of the President of the country.
1919–1920	Return of legionnaires to Czechoslovakia.
1920	Sokol Gathering in Prague 1920, Visit of President Masaryk to the 500th anniversary celebration of the town of Tábor.
1921	Visit of politician and future president of Czechoslovakia, Edvard Beneš, with several color photographs made using the Autochrome process.
1934	Celebration of Czechoslovakia's success in soccer at the 1934 FIFA World Cup.
1936	Olympic Games in Berlín, 1936 Olympic Games in Berlin, 1936.
1948	Communist May Day celebration.

== Archive of the negatives ==
After the death of Josef Jindřich Šechtl the glass plate negatives remained stored in the building of the former Šechtl and Voseček studio and were inherited by his son Josef Šechtl. Josef worked as the head of the new syndicate into which the former Šechtl and Voseček studio was turned, and his wife Marie Šechtlová worked as an employee. The communist regime was afraid of what might be seen in Josef Jindřich's photo essays made during the Nazi occupation, and particularly worried that its own members might be revealed as having collaborated. The family was asked to pass the negatives to the "cultural house" (Dům Osvěty) but decided to keep them in private ownership. As a result, Josef Šechtl was arrested in November 1957 and jailed for one year (ostensibly for taking a photograph of a wedding without permission to practise as a photographer) and the majority of the archive was confiscated shortly afterwards. Marie Šechtlová was tipped off about the impending confiscation, and the night before it brought what she thought were the most important negatives into their new house. A considerable amount of the confiscated material was destroyed but the rest was stored in the Regional Archive in Tábor. In the 1970s the syndicate was relocated to the main square and the Tábor studio destroyed to allow the Hotel Palcát to be built in its place. This led to the destruction of most of the cameras, photographic prints and other items still in the attic of the building. The studio in Pelhřimov (an important example of functionalist architecture by Karel Chochola) survived but was significantly damaged by being abandoned and allowed to decay for years. A result of these events was that the work of Josef Jindřich Šechtl was rarely presented during the communist period.

After the Velvet Revolution in 1989 the Pelhřimov studio was returned to Marie Šechtlová. A book that was already in preparation presenting photographs of Ignác Šechtl, Josef Jindřich Šechtl, Josef Šechtl and Marie Šechtlová was published. In 2004 a project to digitize and publish on the internet the surviving negatives by Šechtl and Voseček studios was started, and the private Šechtl and Voseček Museum of Photography was opened in Tábor.

== Chronology ==
Year	
1877, May 9	Josef Jindřich Šechtl born in Tábor, at house #346, son of Ignác Schächtl (who later changed his name to Ignác Šechtl) and Kateřina Šechtlová née Šťastná. On the same day, [Jan Voseček] started work in Ignác's photographic studio.
1880	Jan Voseček registered as a photographer's assistant in the census.
1895	Jan Voseček became a partner of Ignác Šechtl. The studio was named Schächtl & Voseček, later Šechtl & Voseček.
1895, November	Šechtl & Voseček studio moved to the former studio of Alexander Seik.
1892–1895	Josef Jindřich Šechtl studied in Šechtl & Voseček studios. Served out in 1895.
1897 and earlier	Studied in studios of J. Vilím in Prague and František Krátký in Kolín.
1898–1899	Military service, originally part of Prague battalion #28, later moved to battalion 22 as "polní myslivec"; in 1899 he left service, as the only son and thus required to support his family.
approx. 1900	The Czech written form of "Šechtl" was starting to be used instead of the German form "Schächtl". Josef Jindřich Šechtl started work in Šechtl & Voseček studio.
1902	Šechtl & Voseček had a pavilion at the Regional Exhibition in Tábor. First large photo-reportage of Šechtl & Voseček studios. Both Ignác and Josef Šechtl cooperated in its preparation. Also, first photographs from sport events (Sokol exercises).
1904	Josef Jindřich Šechtl became a partner of Šechtl & Voseček studio.
1906	The affiliated company "Šechtl & Voseček" opened in Pelhřimov.
1906	Šechtl & Voseček studio participated in the Austrian Exhibition in London.
1906, April 4	Josef Jindřich Šechtl awarded official vocational certificate for photography (for his studies in 1892-1895).
1907, May 24	Blueprints accepted for new design of the Šechtl & Voseček studio at Nádražní street #316 (today 9 Května street) in Tábor. The new studio was advertised as being the largest in Southern Bohemia.
1911, July 7	Ignác Šechtl, founder of the studio, died in Tábor.
1911, August 21	Josef Jindřich Šechtl married Anna Stocká (born 21 May 1889) from Písek.
1912, September 12	Ludmila Šechtlová, daughter of Josef Jindřich and Anna, born.
1917, May 9	Šechtl & Voseček studio in Tábor significantly damaged by fire from neighbouring farmyard. Photo-essay about the fire and the following reconstruction were preserved.
1925, April 26	Josef Ferdinand Ignác Šechtl, son of Josef Jindřich and Anna, born in Prague.
1925, November 1	Anna Šechtlová, née Stocká, died in Tábor, aged 36.
1926, May 12	Josef Jindřich Šechtl married Božena Bulínová (born 20 January 1890 in Jivno).
1936, January 1	Jan Voseček, regarded as a member of Šechtl family, died in Tábor.
1948, May 15	Josef Ferdinand Ignác Šechtl married Marie Kokešová, future photographer and partner in Šechtl & Voseček studio.
1951	Nationalization of the Šechtl & Voseček studio by communist government.
1954, March 17	Josef Jindrich Šechtl died in Tábor, aged 76.
