= Hao Boyi =

Hao Boyi (Chinese: 郝伯义, 1938–2019) was an art activist and printmaker. He is credited with the rise of the Beidahuang woodcut movement and the Art Creation Class in northern China. The original generation of Beidahuang printmakers included Chao Mei (b.1931), Zhang Zhenqi (1934–2020), Zhang Zuoliang (1927–2005), Du Hongnian (1928–98), Zhang Lu (1919–77) and the youngest member, Hao Boyi.

== Biography ==
Hao arrived in the Beidahuang reclamation area in 1958, accompanying the military. He excelled at woodworking but had no formal training in fine arts and was self-taught both in general education and artistic skills. During the reclamation period, he developed a broad interest in multiple art forms such as Chinese paintings, western-style oil paintings and prints. Hao organized the Art Creation Class from 1971 until 1991, when he retired due to health reasons.

Hao guided his students to study the techniques, composition and emotional expressiveness of classic Beidahuang prints. He was involved in all aspects of the set up and management of the Art Creation Class, ranging from organizing exhibitions, taking photos of the works and dealing with incoming correspondence. Hao's ability to lead and mentor young artists was said to be crucial to shaping the development of art across subsequent generations of printmakers. He also influenced the transition in the 1980s from traditional, single-method oil-printed woodcuts to a diverse range of techniques, including oil prints, colour separation, black-and-white prints, screenprinting and techniques involving the use of filter paper for rubbing and printing. In 1983 the Chinese magazine Printmaking World awarded the Creative Collective Award to the Beidahuang printmakers.

== Sources ==
- Huang Shiqing, ‘Hao Boyi and the Art Creation Class: Nurturing Beidahuang Printmaking in Northern China’, Print Quarterly, vol.xlii, no.4 (December 2025), pp. 414–25.
- Hao Boyi, ‘On Beidahuang Woodcuts’, Art Garden, I, 1982, pp. 9–12. 郝伯义，关于北大荒版画[J]. 美苑.
- Yang Shiliang, ‘Hao Boyi: The Organizer of the New Beidahuang Woodcuts’, Fine Arts, V, 1985, p. 17. 杨诗粮，新北大荒版画的组织者郝伯义[J]. 美术.
- Hao Boyi, ‘The Art of Pioneers: Beidahuang Woodcuts Then and Now’, Art Research, III, 1982, pp. 56–61. 郝伯义，拓荒者的艺术——北大荒版画今昔[J], 美术研究.
- Hao Boyi. ‘Lush Forests and Blossoming Flowers: Sustaining the Legacy – Training the Next Generation of Reclamation Area Printmakers’, Heilongjiang Fine Arts Bulletin, III, 1982, p. 30. 郝伯义, 林茂花繁, 永续常荣——垦区版画后继队伍的培养[J], 黑龙江美术通讯.
