= Károly Koller =

Austro-Hungarian photographer and painter (1838–1889)

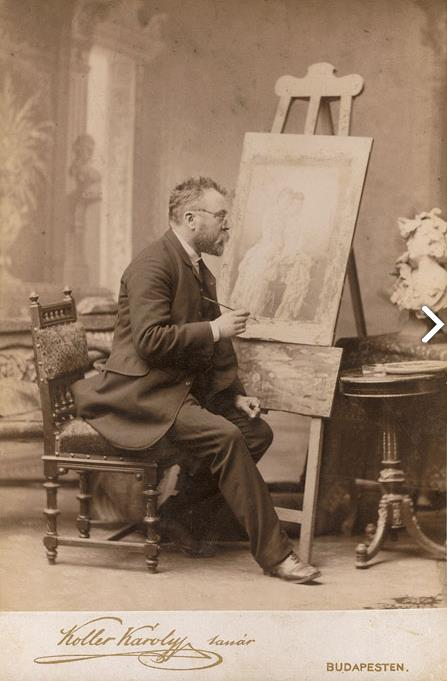
Károly Koller; photograph from his studio (1889)

Károly Koller, originally Karl (28 January 1838 – 26 November 1889) was an Austro-Hungarian photographer and painter.

== Biography ==
His father was originally from Tyrolia, and his mother was from an upper-class family in Kronstadt. Koller was born in Hermannstadt. He attended the German grammar school in his hometown and studied with the drawing teacher, Theodor Glatz, with whom he was associated for many years; operating a joint studio. From 1856 to 1859, he was enrolled at the Polytechnikum and the Academy of Fine Arts in Vienna. From 1859 to 1871, he worked as a drawing teacher in Bistritz, where he first developed his interest in photography. He published two albums in 1862, together with Glatz, depicting notable Transylvanian personalities and Trachten (clothing). From 1866, he was a member of the Viennese Photographische Gesellschaft.

After Glatz died, in 1871, he closed the drawing school, but continued to operate the photography studio, opening branches in Klausenburg and Neumarkt. In 1873, he transferred the company to Glatz's niece, Camilla Asbóth (1838–1908), thereby making her the first independent female photographer in Transylvania. At the 1873 Vienna World's Fair, he received awards for his portraits and chromophotography techniques.

In 1874, he took photographs at the Royal Hungarian residence, Schloss Gödöllő, and was named Court Photographer. The following year, he opened a studio under his Hungarian name, in Budapest, where he employed over thirty people. The well-known artist, József Borsos, also worked there for a time.

He was able to attract a clientele that included many of the local Austro-Hungarian nobility, as well as members of the Imperial Family. A planned move to Klagenfurt was never accomplished. After his sudden death, while dining at a café, his longtime employees, Román Forché and István Gálfy, took over the firm; running it until 1908.

== Selected photographs ==
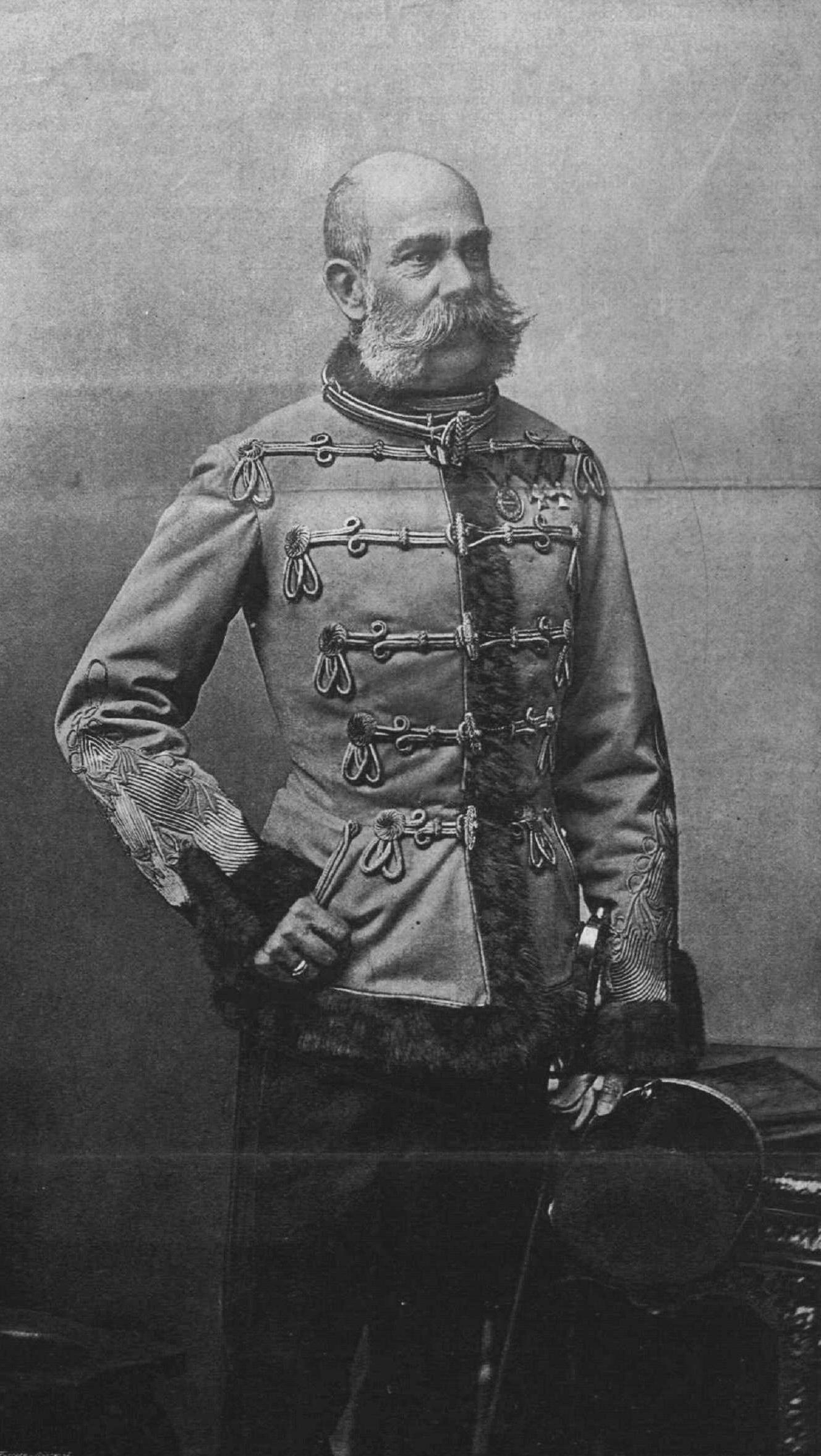
Emperor
Franz Joseph I

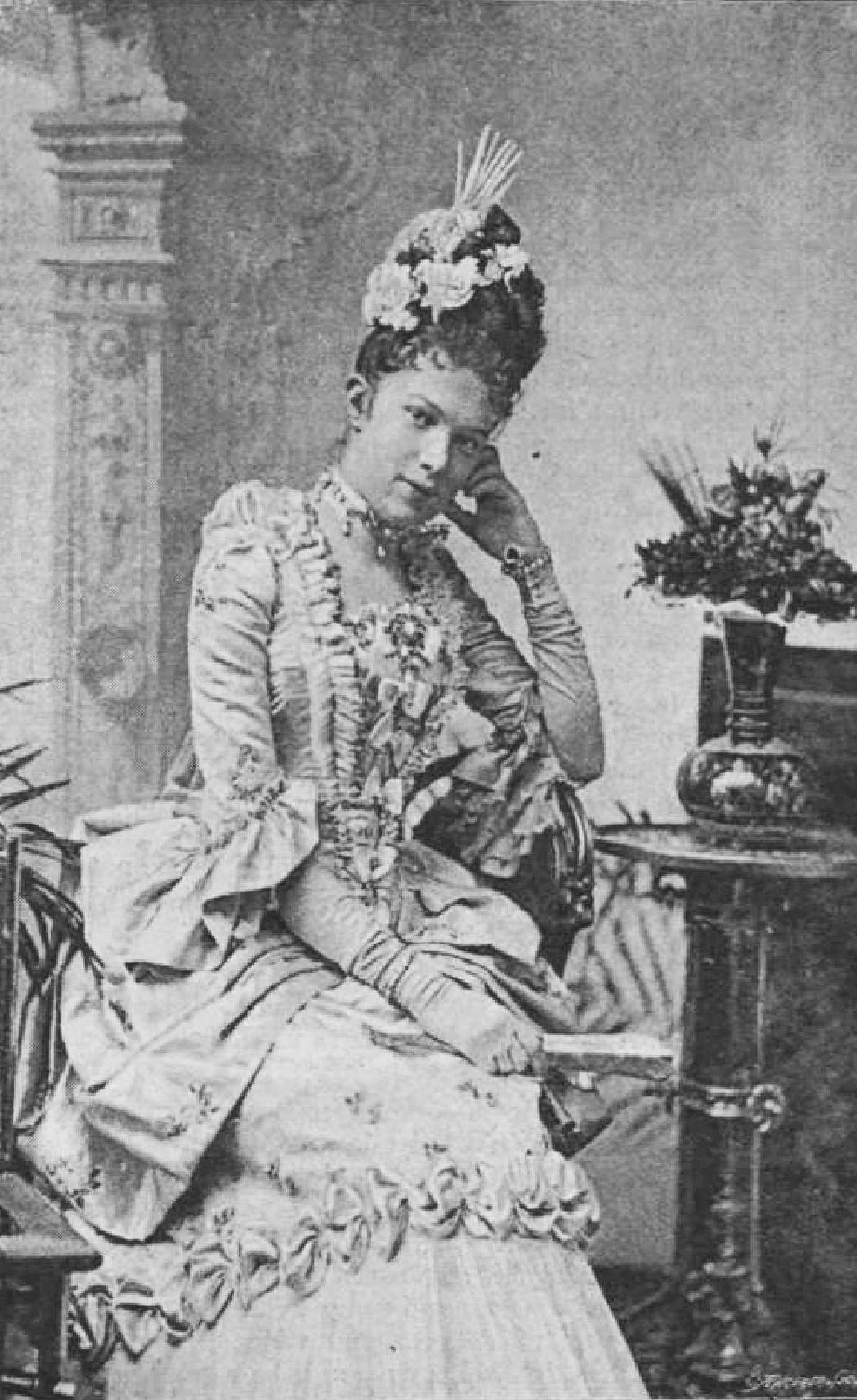
Archduchess
Marie Valerie

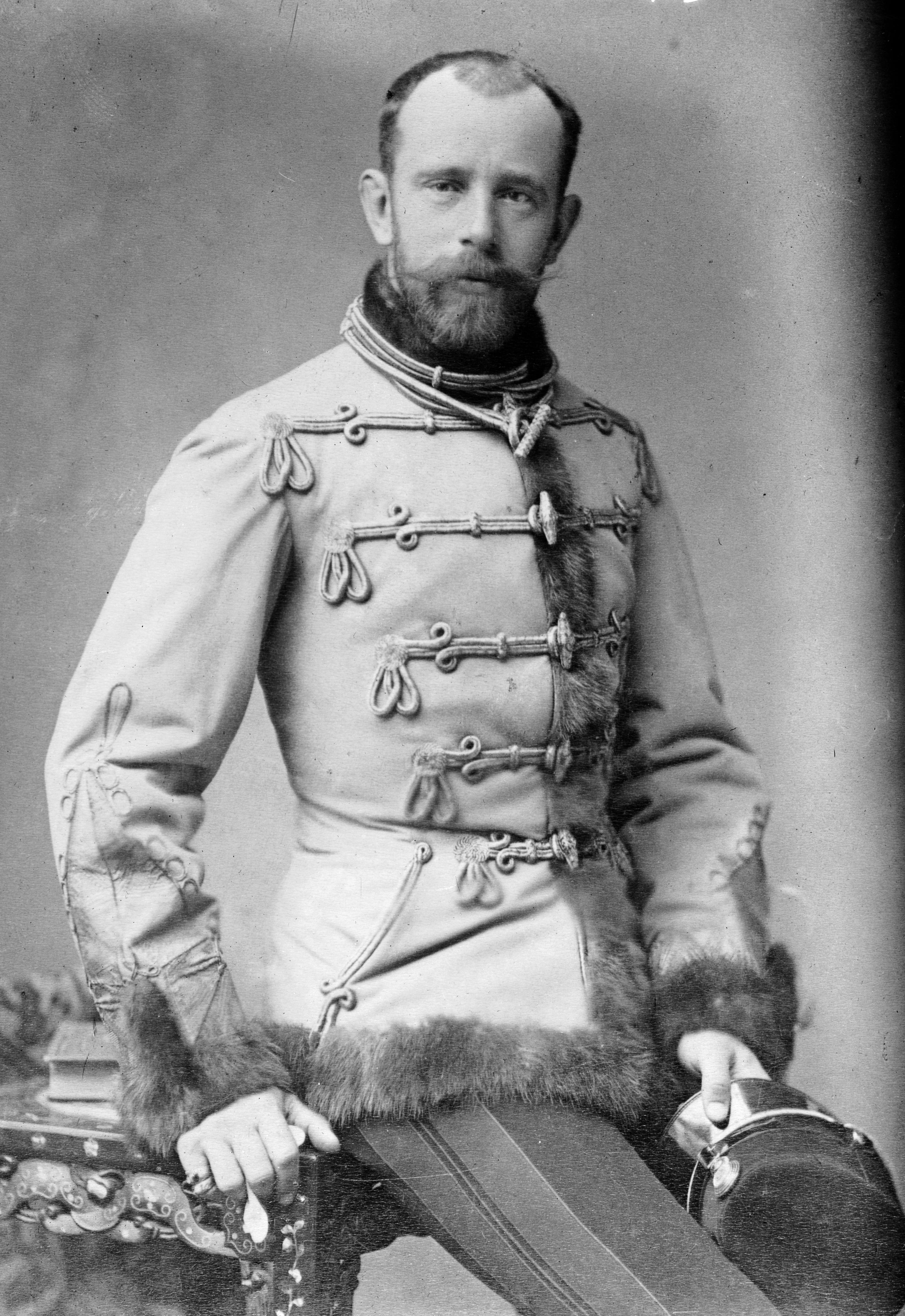
Crown Prince Rudolf

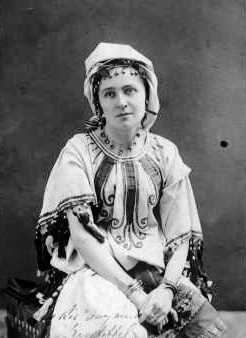
Actress
Mari Jászai

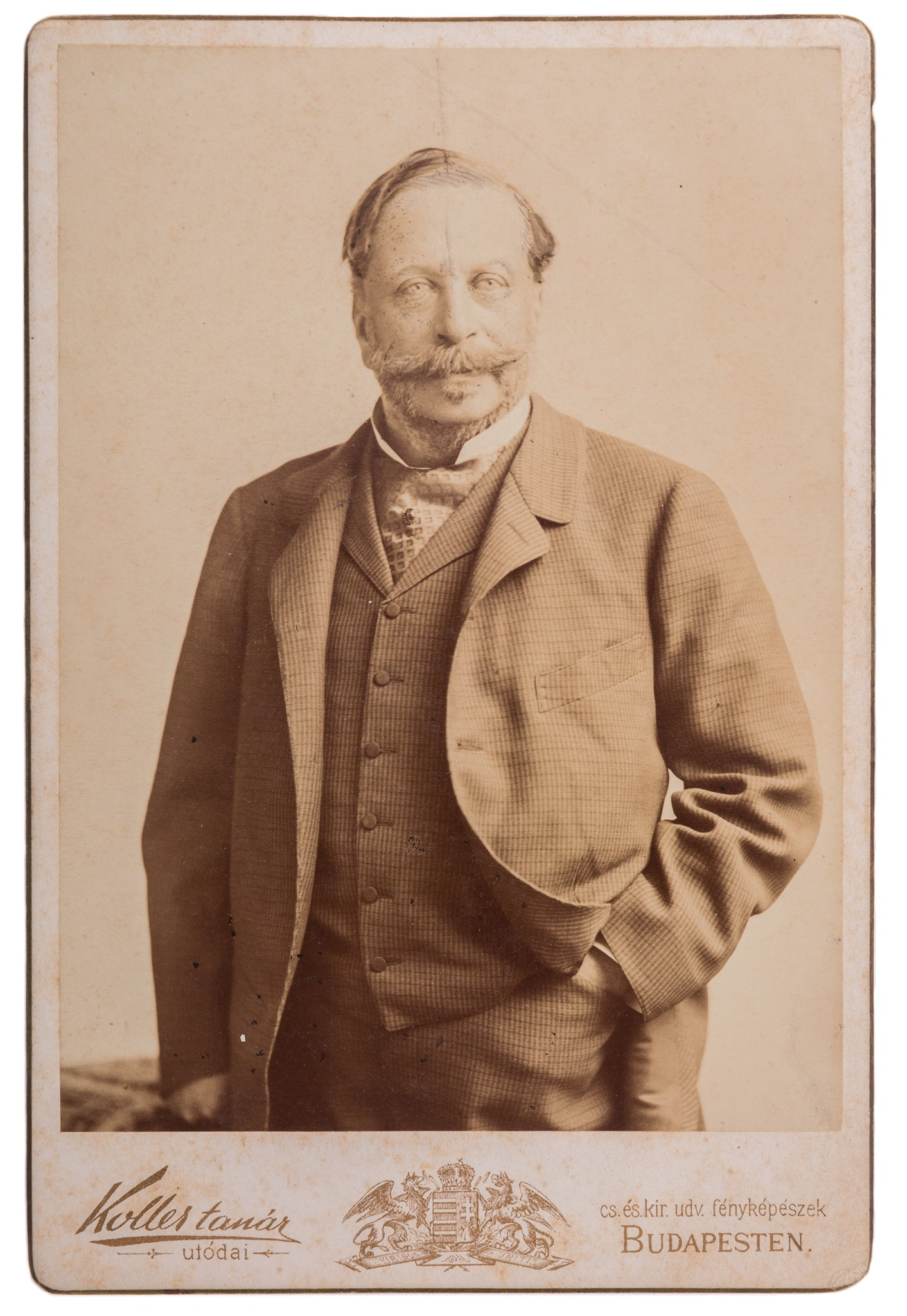
Artist
Manó Andrássy

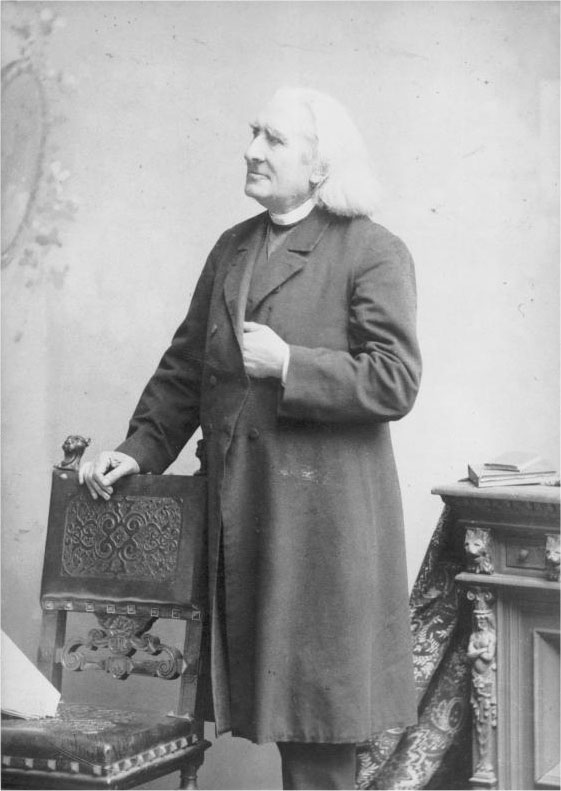
Franz Liszt
