= London wheel =

London wheel may refer to either of two giant Ferris wheels:

- London Eye (opened to the public in 2000), on the South Bank of the River Thames, in the London Borough of Lambeth
- Great Wheel (operated 1895–1906), at Earls Court, in the Royal Borough of Kensington and Chelsea
