= Earls Court Exhibition Centre =

Former venue in London, England

- Earls Court One (1991–2014)
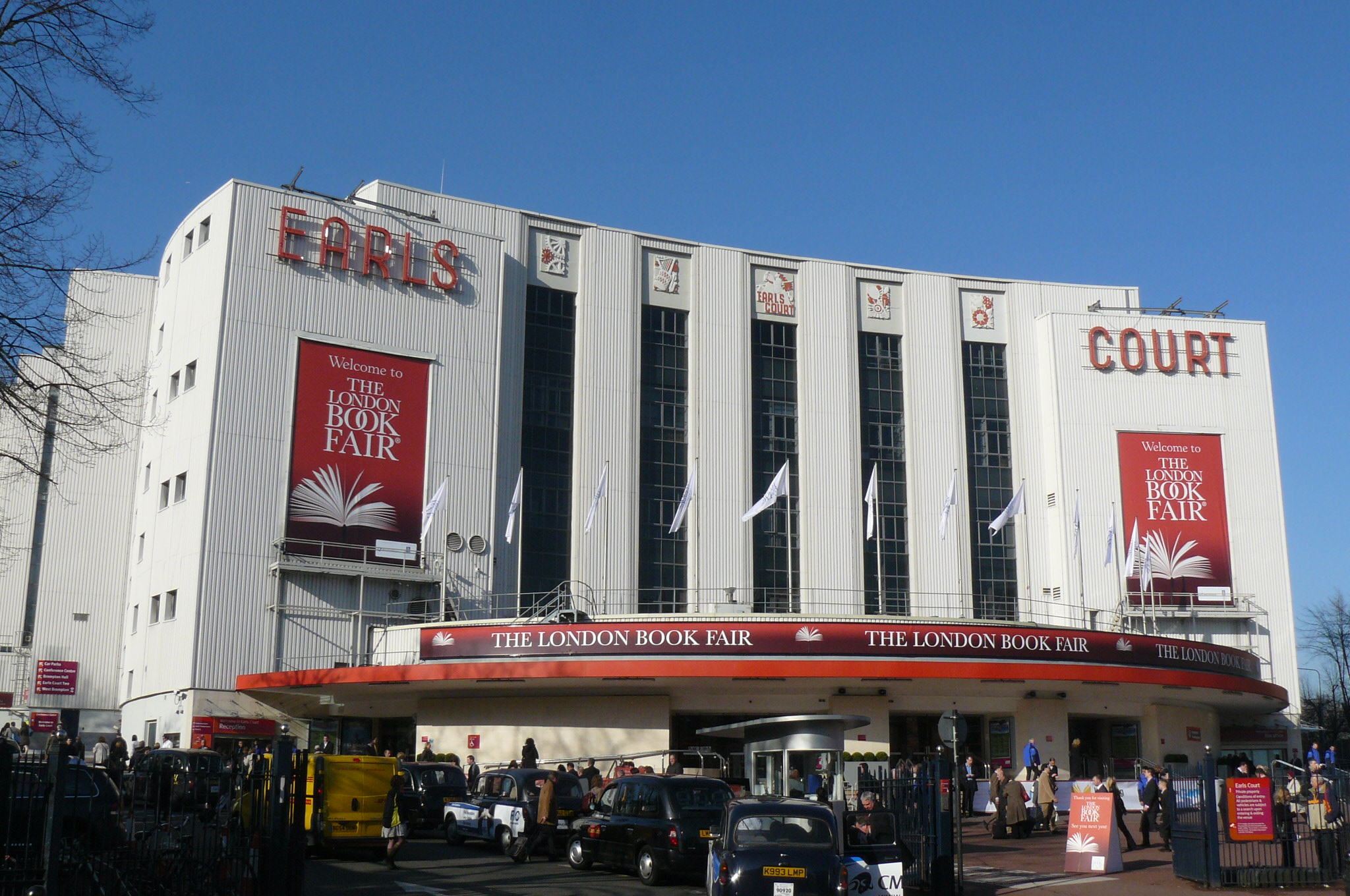
- Earls Court Exhibition Centre in 2008
- Interactive map of Earls Court Exhibition Centre
- Location: Kensington, Fulham, London, SW5; United Kingdom
- Coordinates: 51°29′20″N 0°11′52″W
- Owner: TfL, APG and Delancey
- Capacity: 20,000
- Surface: Versatile
- Public transit: Earl's Court; West Brompton

Construction
- Built: 1935–37
- Opened: 1 September 1937; 89 years ago
- Expanded: EC II in 1991
- Closed: 13 December 2014; 11 years ago
- Demolished: 2014–2016
- Cost: £1.5 million (£92.2 million in 2025 pounds)
- Architect: C. Howard Crane

Earls Court Exhibition Centre was a major international exhibition and events venue in London, England. At its peak it is said to have generated a £2 billion turnover for the economy. It replaced exhibition and entertainment grounds, originally opened in 1887, with an art moderne structure built between 1935 and 1937 by specialist American architect C. Howard Crane. With the active support of London mayor Boris Johnson, in an attempt to create Europe's "largest regeneration scheme", its proposed heritage listing was refused after it was acquired by developers, who promptly in 2008 applied for and were granted a Certificate of Immunity from Listing by English Heritage, and its demolition was completed in 2017.

Located in Earl's Court but straddling the boundary between the Royal Borough of Kensington and Chelsea and the Borough of Hammersmith and Fulham, it was the largest such venue within the capital served by two London Underground stations—one of them, Earl's Court tube station, being specially adapted with a tunnel for show visitors, and in latter years with a direct link to Heathrow Airport. The founder of the entertainment grounds was the Leeds entrepreneur John R. Whitley and the first attraction headlined performances by Buffalo Bill Cody as part of the American Show visited by Queen Victoria and subsequently by members of the Royal Household. This was followed by numerous other exhibitions representing countries such as Canada, France and India.

Earls Court was widely known for serving as London's and the country's premier exhibition venue for many decades, hosting the Royal Smithfield Show, Royal Tournament, the British International Motor Show, London Boat Show, the Ideal Home Show, Billy Graham rallies, the Brit Awards (until 2010), Crufts and other events such as large scale opera productions and pop concerts in addition to hundreds of trade shows, such as the London Book Fair. It was also used as one of the venues for both the 1948 and 2012 Olympic Games.

== History ==
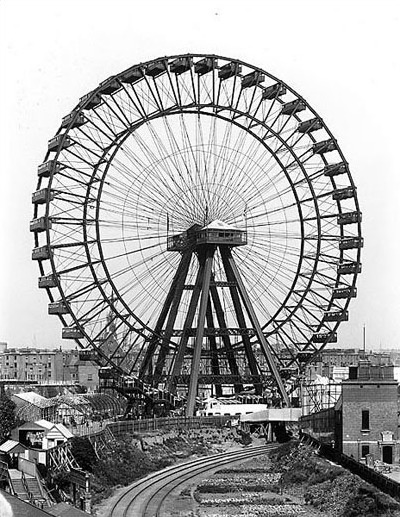
The 1894 Great Wheel at Earl's Court

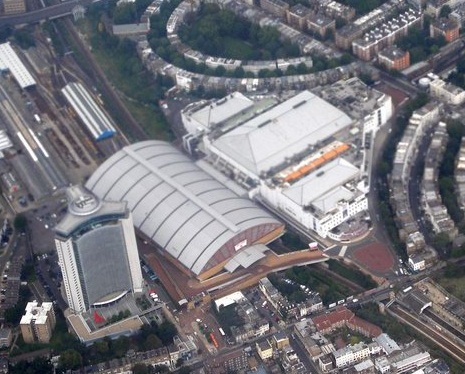
Aerial view of Earls Court, 2008 L-R Empress State Building, Earls Court Two and Earls Court

Before 1887, Earl's Court was farmland attached to Earl's Court Manor. With the arrival of a multiplicity of railway companies, and before London Underground became distinct from the cross-country railways, the tracks formed a triangle which became 'waste ground'. The introduction of two Underground stations, and a mass network of rails trapped the land. The notion of introducing education and entertainment to the area was effected by John Robinson Whitley, an entrepreneur who used the land as a showground for a five years from 1887. Whitley did not profit from his efforts, yet his desire had decided the future of Earl's Court and its purpose in later years. The Great Wheel, a Ferris wheel, was created for Imre Kiralfy's Empire of India Exhibition in 1895. A plaque in the EC press centre commemorated some of these facts and that the reclusive Queen Victoria was an occasional visitor to the shows. Kiralfy had the neighbouring Empress Hall built to seat 6,000 people and then had the Earls Court grounds converted in the style of the 1893 Chicago White City for the Columbian Exposition, and went on to found nearby White City in 1908.

In 1935, Earls Court was sold and the new owners decided to construct an exhibition centre, with an internal pool, to rival any other in the world and to dominate the nearby Olympia exhibition hall. The plan was to create Europe's largest structure by volume. The project did not go exactly to plan; it ran over budget and was late in completion. Designed by the specialist American theatre architect, C. Howard Crane, with over 40,000 sq m of space over two levels, Earls Court finally opened its doors to the public for the Chocolate and Confectionery Exhibition on 1 September 1937. The British International Motor Show immediately followed and later the Commercial Vehicle show. In spite of all the problems during the latter part of its construction, the project was eventually completed at a cost of £1.5 million.

At the centre of Earls Court was its internal pool or "lake" (its basin being 60m long and 30m wide), which for use took four days to fill and four days to empty; 2 1/4 million gallons of water were required to fill it. These operations could only be accomplished at night, so as not to put undue strain on local services. A 750-tonne retractable floor in three sections covered the pool when not in use and was lowered using water hydraulic rams. The pool was used for watercraft exhibitions and lastly as a feature for the Ideal Home Show in 2011.

A new entrance to Earl's Court tube station was constructed on Warwick Road to facilitate easy access to the exhibition centre, including a direct entrance from the underground passage which connected the District and Piccadilly lines. However, this was closed in the 1990s after the capacity of the exhibition centre had been expanded by the construction of a second hall, Earls Court Two, in an effort to compete with the National Exhibition Centre (NEC) in Birmingham.

=== Earls Court Two ===
Earls Court Two
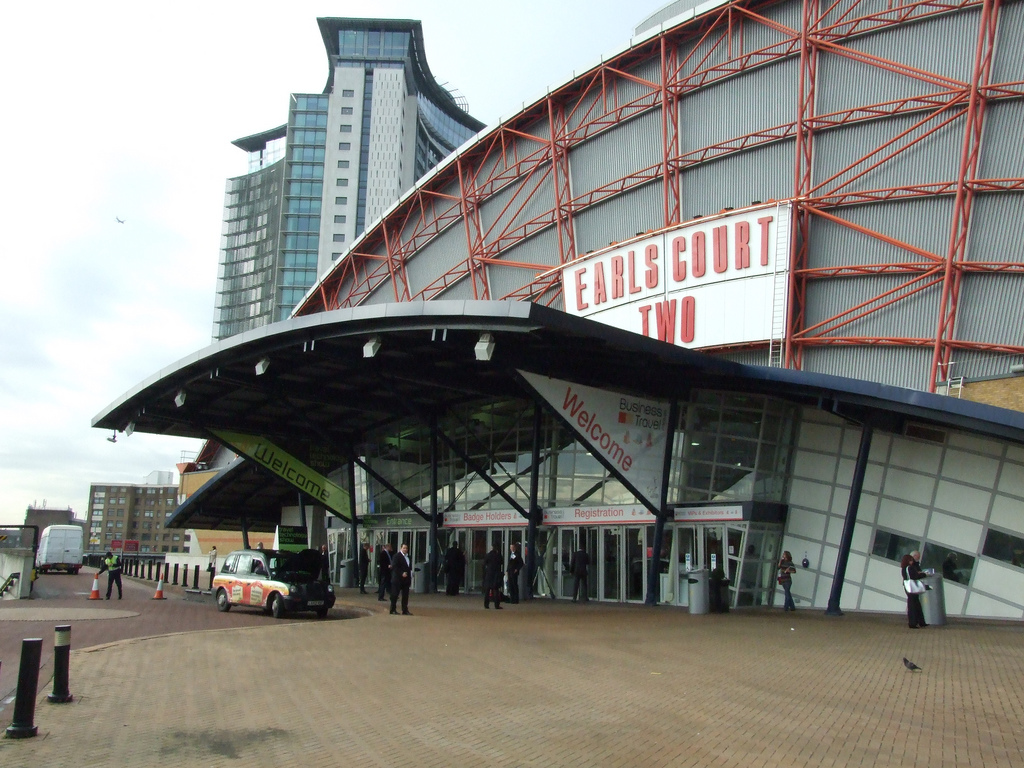
- Entrance to Earls Court Two, 2009
- Interactive map of Earls Court Two
- Location: Kensington, London, SW5; United Kingdom
- Owner: Capital and Counties Plc
- Capacity: 10,750 or 6,000 (seated)

Construction
- Opened: 17 October 1991
- Closed: 13 December 2014
- Demolished: 2015
- Cost: £100 million (£310 million in 2025 pounds)

In 1985 it was decided by the then owners P&O to expand the covered venue to fend off competition from rival national venues, such as the NEC in Birmingham and in response to the drastic need to increase exhibition space.

Earls Court Two was built over the London Underground and British Rail lines and adjacent land originally occupied by a mass of sheds linked to the Lillie Bridge Engineering and Railway Depot in Hammersmith and Fulham. Earls Court Two was constructed at a cost of £100 million. The barrel-roofed hall linked with Earls Court One; the hall's 17,000 sq m floor was entirely column-free and could hold a maximum capacity of 10,750. The hall was opened by Diana, Princess of Wales on 17 October 1991. The biennial London Motorfair was the first event held in the new hall. Following the construction of Earls Court Two, the original building became known sometimes as Earls Court One. One of the largest gatherings at Earls Court II was the United Kingdom Padhramni from 5–14 August 1994 when the Aga Khan visited daily for a series of religious gatherings with the UK and international Ismaili Muslim community.

Earls Court Two was demolished by Capco Plc in 2015.

=== Closure ===
With falling attendances and the sale of Earls Court-Olympia to a newly formed developer group in 2008 confidential plans were drawn up to demolish Earls Court. These were approved in outline by the two local authorities in 2013, along with a swathe of public housing, existing retail and the historic Lillie Bridge Depot in Fulham in order to make way for four new urban "villages" inspired by Terry Farrell on the 80-acre site, which was expected to be completed in 2033. Demolition work began on the site in December 2014 following its closure on 13 December. The final event in the main Earls Court was a concert by indie rock band Bombay Bicycle Club. The final event to be broadcast from the venue was the 2014 BBC Music Awards two days earlier. As of 2025 the site remains derelict.

== Events ==
=== Exhibitions ===
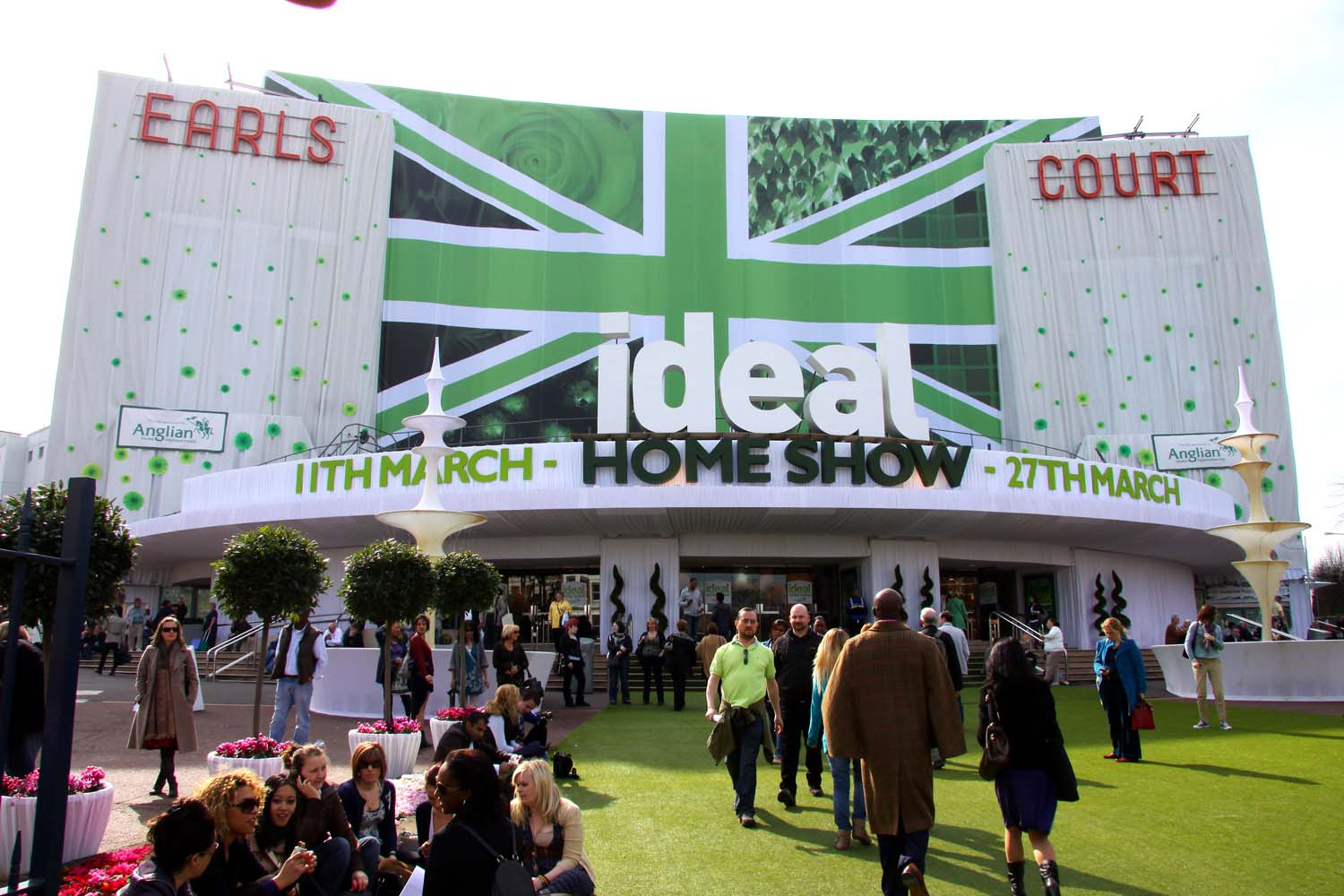
Ideal Home Show (March 2011)

Earls Court hosted many shows and exhibitions throughout the years, including the Earls Court Motor Show, Ideal Home Show and the BRIT Awards. The MPH Show, one of Britain's largest motoring exhibitions and shows, hosted by Jeremy Clarkson and others, took place there each winter after an earlier showing at the National Exhibition Centre in Birmingham.

Each summer from 1950 to 1999, Earls Court was home to the Royal Tournament, the first, oldest and biggest military tattoo in the world. For this the area now occupied by Earls Court Two became a stables, artillery and vehicle depot for some two months, with several hundred military personnel from all three services billeted 'on site'.

The Professional Lighting and Sound Association held its annual trade show, the PLASA Show, at Earls Court between 1992 and 2012. The 2013 show was held at ExCeL.

London Film and Comic Con was hosted at Earls Court 2, held every July. The convention held autograph and photoshoot sessions with celebrity guests as well as providing a place to play games and buy collectables. In July 2014, due to the increase in the event's popularity, it was hosted in both Earls Court 1 and Earls Court 2.

==== Historical ====
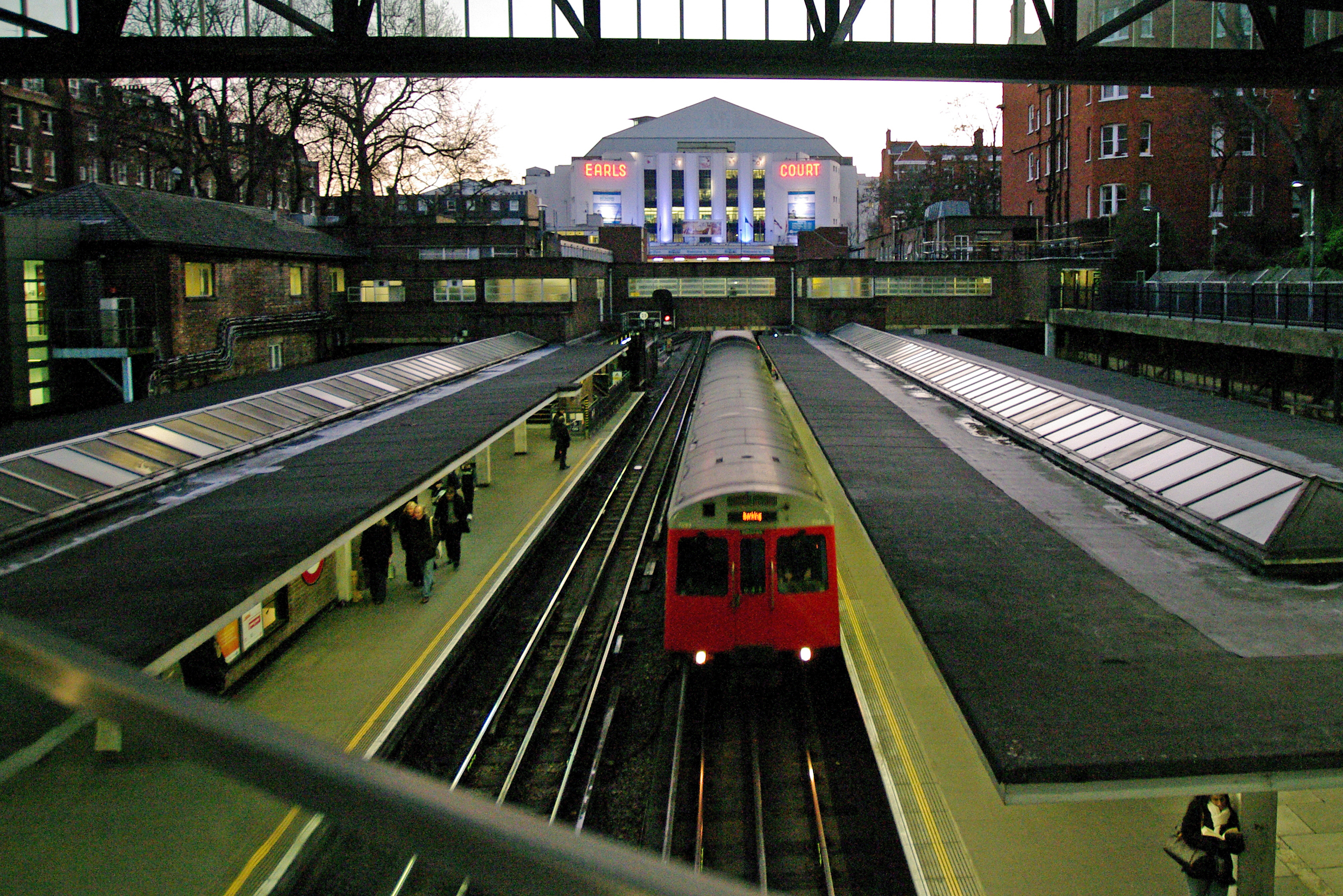
Earls Court frontage viewed from Earl's Court station

Notable historic exhibitions at the centre included:

- The American Show, 1887.
- The Italian Exhibition in London, 1888.
- The Spanish Exhibition, 1889.
- French Exhibition, 1890.
- German Exhibition, 1891.
- Captain Boynton's Water Show, 1893.
- Empire of India Exhibition, 1895.
- Empire of India & Ceylon Exhibition, 1896.
- International Universal Exhibition, 1898.
- Greater Britain Exhibition, 1899.
- Paris in London, 1902.
- International Fire Exhibition, 1903.
- Italian Exhibition, 1904.
- Imperial-Royal Austrian Exhibition, 1906.
- Balkan States Exhibition, 1907.
- Old Japan, 1907.
- Golden West Exhibition, 1909.
- Shakespeare's England, 1912.
- Soviet Industrial Exhibition, 1961

=== Boat shows ===
The central area of the main hall concealed a massive pool area, formerly used for the London Boat Show which was held annually from 1960 until 2003. The event transferred to ExCeL in the London Docklands the following year. It was also briefly used for the Earls Court Boat Show in 2007 and 2008.

=== War refugees camp ===
During the First World War, Earls Court Exhibition grounds, including the adjacent 6,000 seater Empress Hall, turned into a huge refugee camp of the British Government. From 15 October 1914 onwards until 1919, more than 100,000 Belgian refugees stayed in this camp.

=== Sports ===
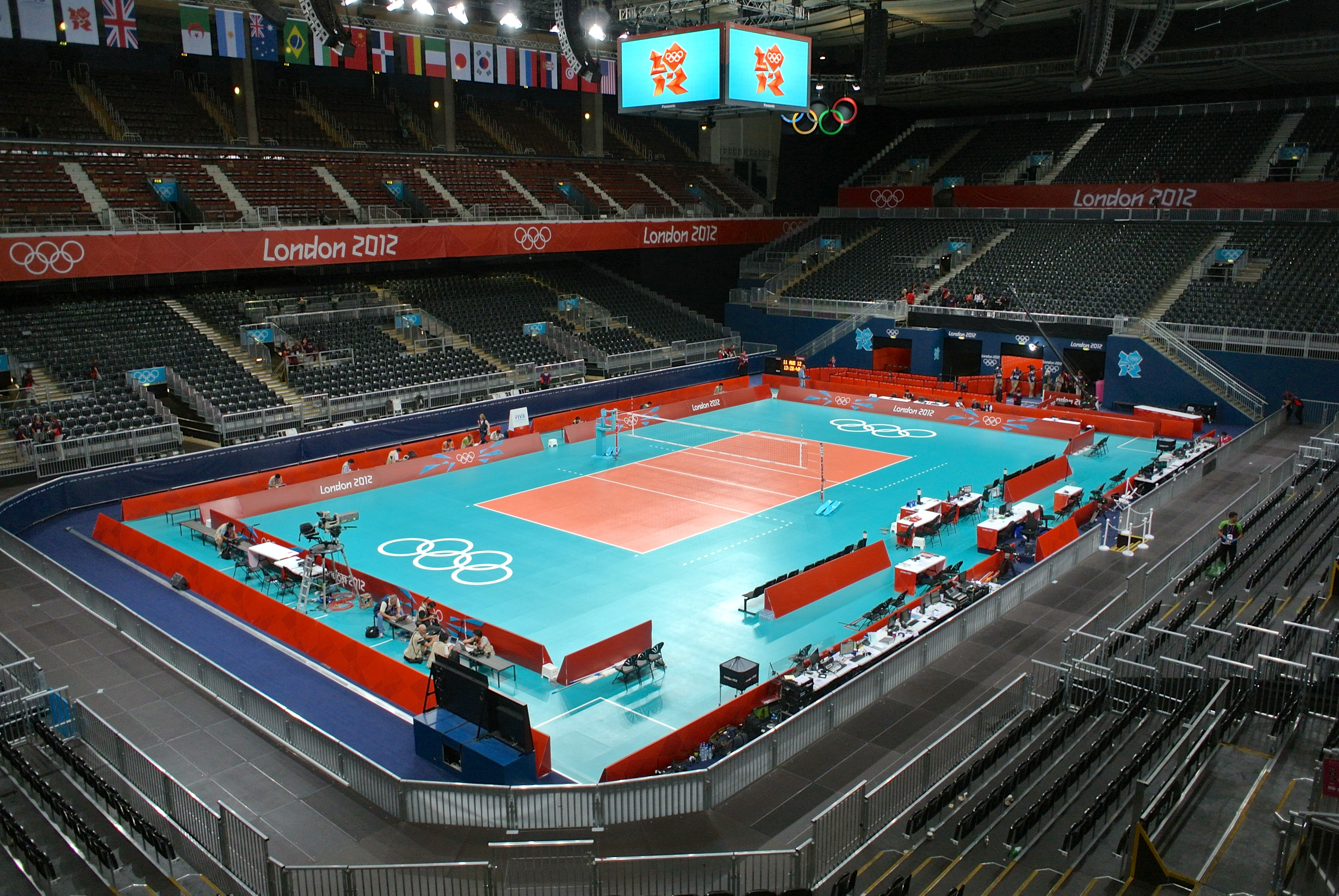
Earls Court hosted the volleyball matches during the 2012 Summer Olympics.

Empress Hall was the site of the first game played outside of North America by any of the major North American professional sports leagues, when on 21 April 1938 the Detroit Red Wings and the Montreal Canadiens of the NHL played the starting game of the 1938 Detroit Red Wings–Montreal Canadiens European tour there.

The venue hosted the News of the World Darts Championship final stages from 1950 to 1958.

In professional wrestling, the World Wrestling Federation (Note: Renamed to World Wrestling Entertainment (WWE) in 2002) staged the 2000 and 2001 editions of their annual UK-exclusive Insurrextion Pay-per-view at Earl's Court, drawing an attendance of 17,000 and 16,000 respectively. The WWE returned to hold a TV taping in April 2007, taping an episode of Monday Night Raw and Heat on 23 April and an episode of ECW and Friday Night SmackDown on 24 April. The episode of Raw's main event featured a 60-minute Iron Man match between WWE Champion John Cena and Shawn Michaels, which is widely regarded as one of the greatest matches in the show's history. On 27 July 2014, Japanese promotion Dragon Gate held the final show of their UK affiliate promotion at Earl's Court.

Earls Court hosted the volleyball competitions in the 2012 Summer Olympics. The volleyball events were scheduled for the multi-sport arenas in the Olympic Park. At the 1948 Summer Olympics, the venue hosted the boxing preliminaries, gymnastics, weightlifting, and wrestling events.

The London leg of the 2010 FIFA World Cup Trophy Tour was held at Earls Court Two on 11 March, with Wayne Rooney making an appearance with the trophy.

=== Religious gathering ===
Earls Court was the venue for the visit or mulaqat of the Aga Khan during the inauguration of the Ismaili Centre at Cromwell Gardens on 24 April 1985.

=== Musical events ===
Earls Court was one of the most popular arenas to play in the UK, with a capacity of around 19,000 including standing room, meaning it was often chosen over other venues by bands with a large fan base. Slade and David Bowie were the first rock acts to play there, in 1973. Led Zeppelin performed five sold-out shows at the venue in May 1975. Queen played there on June 6 and 7, 1977, for two sold-out shows. Bowie's 1978 concert performance, part of his Isolar II Tour, was released as Welcome to the Blackout (Live London '78) in 2018. Pink Floyd performed live shows since 1972, and the concerts from The Wall Tour in 1980 and 1981 were recorded and released in 2000 as Is There Anybody Out There? The Wall Live 1980–81, while performances from The Division Bell Tour in October 1994 were recorded and released on the live concert film Pulse.

Genesis performed live shows since 1977, and between 2 and 8 November 1992 they performed six shows at the venue during their We Can't Dance Tour, in which their shows on 6–8 November were filmed and later released on VHS and later DVD under the title The Way We Walk. In November 1995, Oasis staged the two biggest ever indoor concerts at the time in Europe, at a specially expanded Earls Court. Between 28 May and 1 June 2002, Irish vocal pop band Westlife held concerts as part of their World of Our Own Tour supporting their album World of Our Own. However, after the opening of the O2 Arena in 2007, concert performances at Earls Court were rarer. Iron Maiden performed at Earls Court in 2000, 2003 and two nights in 2006 – each time sold out with circa 21,000 in attendance.

==== Pink Floyd seating collapse, 1994 ====
On the night of 12 October 1994, Pink Floyd were scheduled to begin a 14-night residency of the venue as part of The Division Bell Tour. During their opening song, "Shine On You Crazy Diamond" a section of seating, containing 1,200 attendees, collapsed, injuring 90 people with no fatalities. The show was immediately cancelled and rescheduled for 17 October.

==== Spice Girls incident, 1999 ====
On 11, 12, 14 and 15 December 1999, the Spice Girls performed Christmas in Spiceworld Tour.

While dismantling the stage on 16 December, a worker died from falling more than 80 ft.

==== Brit Awards ====
The Brit Awards, the British Phonographic Industry's annual pop music awards, were first held at Earls Court in 1996 and 1997. The awards show returned in 2000 at Earls Court Two, before moving back to the main Earls Court in 2006. The awards show moved to The O2 Arena in 2011.

=== Dog Show ===
Before moving to the Birmingham's NEC, Crufts Dog show was held here annually. With public and Kennel club concerns about the neglect and mistreatment of dogs, it introduced an annual exhibition aimed at showing how best to look after dogs as pets or care companions named Discover Dogs. The last show in London was held in 2014.

== Demolition and redevelopment ==
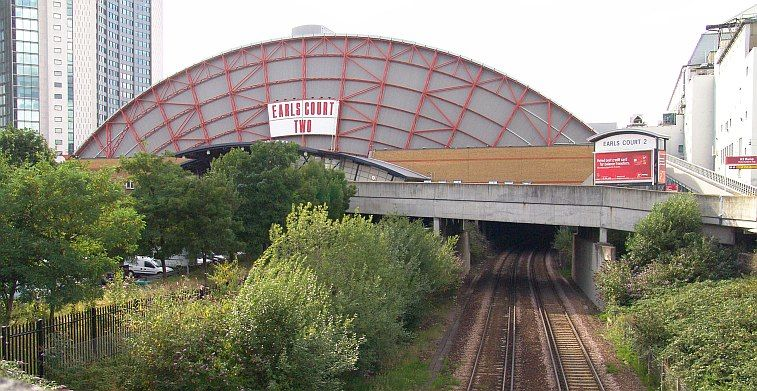
Earls Court 2 and former Green corridor

The owner of Earls Court and Olympia, Capital & Counties Properties (also known as Capco), opened discussions in 2010 with the London Borough of Hammersmith & Fulham and the Royal Borough of Kensington & Chelsea to demolish the existing landmark centre and redevelop the area with up to 8,000 residential flats, retail outlets and, possibly, a new convention centre.

Demolition work began on the site in December 2014.

=== Earls Court Exhibition ancillary site in Fulham ===
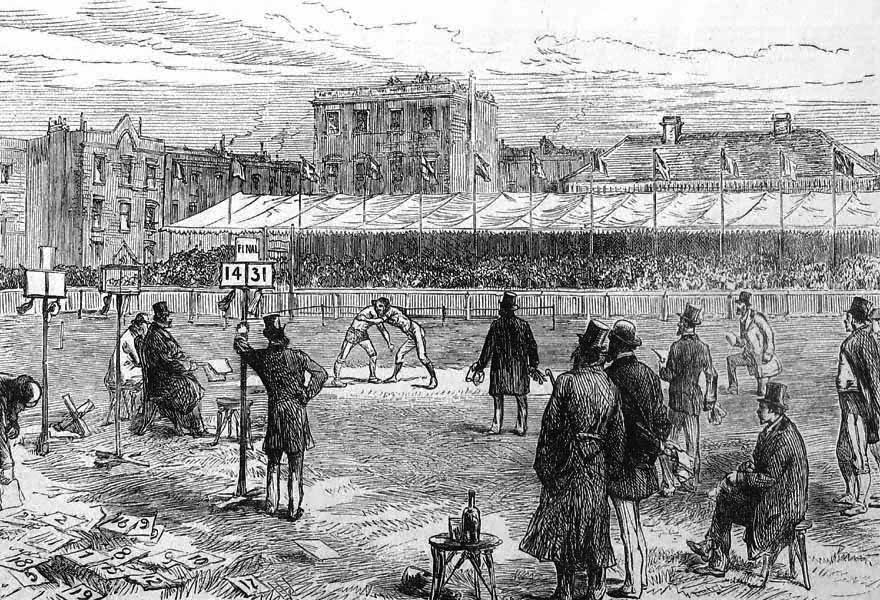
Lillie Sports Ground, c. 1875

Since the 1970s, Earls Court-Olympia had acquired parcels of industrial land west of the West London Railway in Fulham to use as a marshalling yard and overspill car park for the exhibition centre. Prior to its early 20th-century mixed industrial use, as a coal yard and for the automotive industry, the 20 or so acres were known as the "Lillie Bridge Grounds", a popular sports destination. Since the site's acquisition by Capco plc as part of the Earls Court Exhibition Centre deal, it is being redeveloped as "Lillie Square", an estate of apartment blocks, some of them high-rise.

=== Opposition to demolition ===
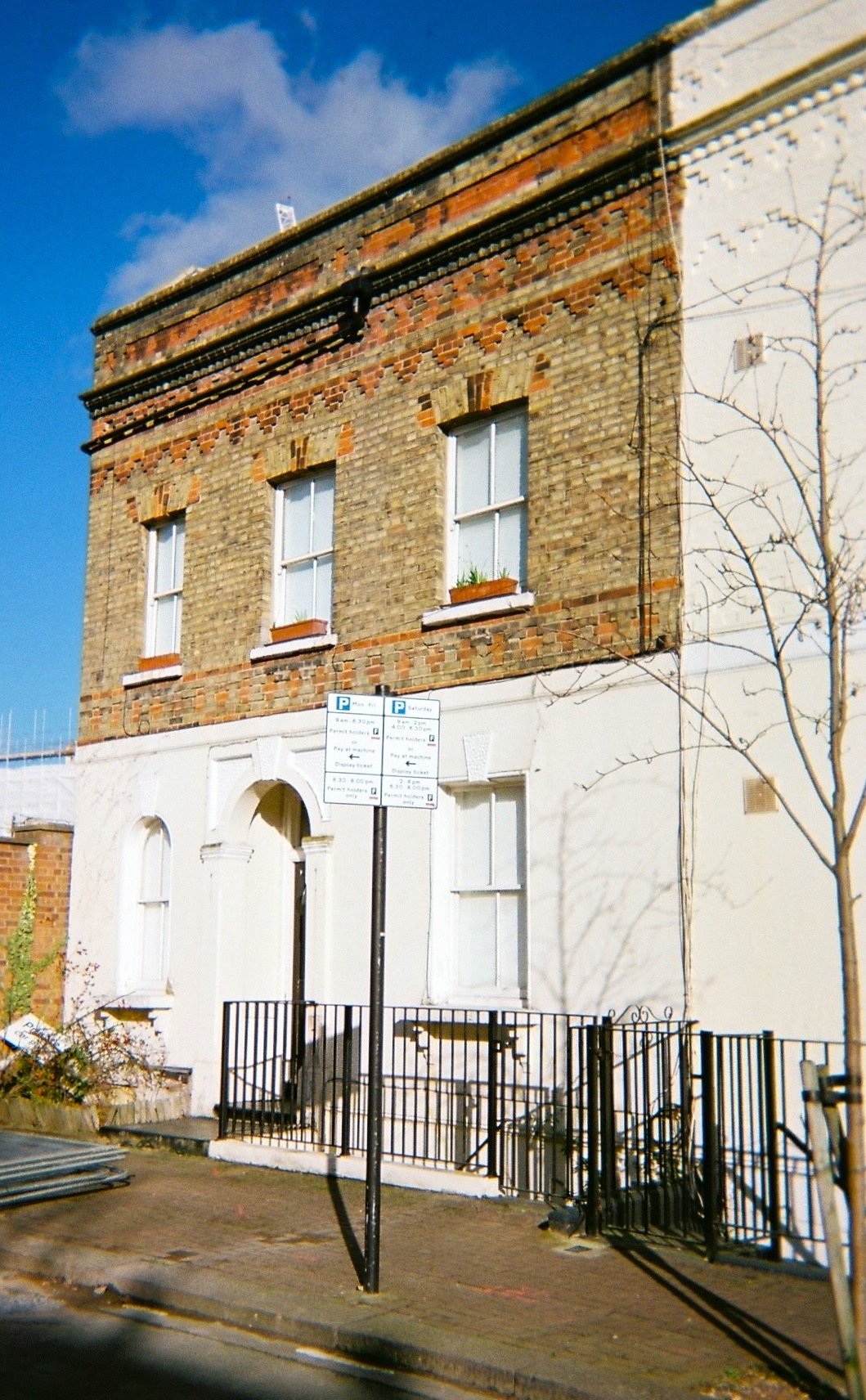
1865 heritage buildings in Empress Place SW6, named in honour of Queen Victoria's visit, backing onto Earls Court 2 also due for demolition

The demolition of Earls Court was opposed by the 'Earl's Court Area Action Group', which began a 'Save Earl's Court' campaign. The Group is composed of local residents and interested parties who would be affected by the exhibition centre's destruction and subsequent 20 years of proposed redevelopment.

Darren Johnson, a Green Party member of the London Assembly, wrote to the Mayor of London, Boris Johnson, and argued that "the Earl's Court demolition plans are a recipe for a disaster, with massive economic, social and environmental consequences. The winners will be the wealthy developers and overseas property speculators while the losers will be the community, local businesses and Londoners who will lose one of the capital's key exhibition centres."

The Guardian's London blogger Dave Hill cited concerns over the number and relative affordability of the housing units to be constructed on the site after the proposed demolition of Earls Court, as well as concerns over the views of local residents.

Boris Johnson approved the redevelopment plans on 3 July 2013, stating: "I'm in no doubt that the development will provide a massive boost not just to this part of the capital, but to London's wider economy as well."

=== H&F Council bid to take over scheme ===
Since the election of a Labour majority on the Hammersmith and Fulham side of the boundary in 2014, relations between the developers and elected representatives have soured if not stalled. Sensitivities on the Conservative Kensington and Chelsea side have grown since the Grenfell tragedy in 2017 has put elected representatives in the spotlight in relation to their public responsibilities. During 2018 the developers have been touting for buyers to off-load at least part of the scheme. In February 2019 Hammersmith and Fulham Borough Council let it be known they were considering a Compulsory purchase order to take over the Earls Court and adjacent land currently banked by the developers. In May 2019 H&F Council indicated they would be going ahead with raising £200 million capital to compulsorily purchase the land, including that in RBKC, with a view to "remastering" the plans, a decision to be considered at a full council meeting in September 2019. A spokesman for the developers responded that the council had not demonstrated their capacity to do this.

=== Earls Court sold on ===
Capco plc sold their declining interest in Earls Court to APG, a Dutch pension fund, and to the British firm Delancey for £425 million in November 2019. The two Hammersmith and Fulham housing estates were sold back to the Council at cost.

In November 2025, it was announced a £10 billion regeneration project for the Earls Court site had reached a "major milestone", after the first of two applications was approved. The two applications will eventually see 4,000 homes built on the site, with an expected completion date of 2043. The applications were filed by the Earl's Court Development Company, which is reportedly a joint venture between Delancey, APG and Places for London, which is Transport for London's property arm.

== See also ==
- John Robinson Whitley
- Imre Kiralfy
- Vauxhall Pleasure Gardens

== Notes ==
Preceded by Crown of Beauty Theatre (China) Sanya	Miss World venue 2011	Succeeded by Dongsheng Fitness Center Stadium (China) Ordos City
