= Šechtl and Voseček =

Photographic studio in Tábor

Coordinates: 49°24′48.22″N 14°39′22.11″E

Šechtl and Voseček was a photographic studio in Tábor in what is today the Czech Republic. It emerged from the studio of Ignác Šechtl (German: Schächtl). In 1888, he accepted his assistant Jan Voseček as co-member of his photographic studio. The studio operated from 1888 to 1953.

== History ==
=== Ignác Šechtl & Jan Voseček ===
The history of Šechtl & Voseček Studios goes back to 1863, when Ignác Šechtl (1840–1911) made the decision to leave his work as a clerk in Prague, to study the new craft of photography in Kladno. After training, he opened a studio in Plzeň. In 1869, he decided to leave the city and become an itinerant photographer. He tried his luck in Bucharest in 1871, and later in Nepomuk and Prachatice. Several significant photographs remain from this period. One unique work that has survived is a photomontage, achieved by double exposure, depicting Šechtl both as laboratory worker, and retouching a photo, in the same picture.

In 1876, aged 36, Ignác Šechtl finally settled in Tábor, and officially opened his studio at house #333 on the square Marináské náměstí (today Náměstí Mikuláše z Husi). His son, Josef Jindřich, was born in 1877. Family tradition says that the same day, in a pub, Šechtl met the commercial traveler, Jan Voseček (1851–1936), who very soon became almost a part of the family.

A very important phase in the history of the studio was the period of cooperation with the first photographer in Tábor, Alexander Seik (1824–1905), which was officially announced in 1878. From this, Ignác Šechtl got clients, and money to buy modern equipment. After the "united photographic studio" with Seik was dissolved, in 1888, Ignác Šechtl took Jan Voseček into partnership, and the firm became known as "Šechtl & Voseček" (initially spelled "Schächtl & Voseček").

=== Josef Jindřich Šechtl ===
Josef Jindřich Šechtl (1877–1954) continued his father's tradition. In 1907 he commenced the building of a modern photographic studio in the main street, where the Hotel Palcát now stands. Josef Jindřich Šechtl was famous for his quality portraits and group photographs. Many of the famous people who visited Tábor at this time were also photographed in the Šechtl and Voseček studios. As with his father, his passion was photojournalism, and he has provided us with a unique photo documentary of his time. Thanks to his attention to detail, his reputation grew, and the family business blossomed.

=== Josef Šechtl and Marie Šechtlová ===
Josef Šechtl (1925–1992) and his wife Marie Šechtlová (1928–2008) took over the studio in 1944. Marie in particular, brought a feminine emotive element to their work. In the 1960s, she was among the most successful photographers of "the poetry of the everyday". Following the nationalisation of the studio by the Communist government in 1953, they continued working as freelance photographers, mounting many exhibitions and producing a number of publications, including Tábor, Jižní Čechy, Hradec Králové, and Loutky. Together, they were a team of art photographers, pioneering colour photography, and the use of large photographs for interior decoration.

== Museum and archive digitisation ==
A project of digitising the archive of Šechtl and Voseček's photographs aims to make available online some 10,000 preserved glass plate negatives from 1860 to the 1950s, hundreds of 35mm films (1930 to 1950s), and thousands of medium- and large-format images.

The small Šechtl & Voseček Museum of Photography has been created, in cooperation with the Škrla family, at their site on Nicholas of Hus Square. The museum is dealing with the project of digitising the archive. Three times a year, the museum prepares a themed exhibition of 80–100 pictures, to share this record of the history of Tábor and of photography.
