= 1961 Soviet Industrial Exhibition =

Soviet Industrial Exhibition
- Flag of the Soviet Union
- Date: July 1961
- Venue: Earls Court Exhibition Centre, London

The Soviets Industrial Exhibition opened in July 1961 in London at the Earls Court Exhibition Centre.

The Soviet exhibition was the USSR’s largest foreign display to date with the Foreign Office briefing that it was "larger than the Soviet Exhibit at the Brussels fair" in 1958.

The exhibition’s opening was attended by Prime Minister Macmillan and other cabinet members.
