= Imperial Austrian Exhibition =

1906 exposition held in London, England

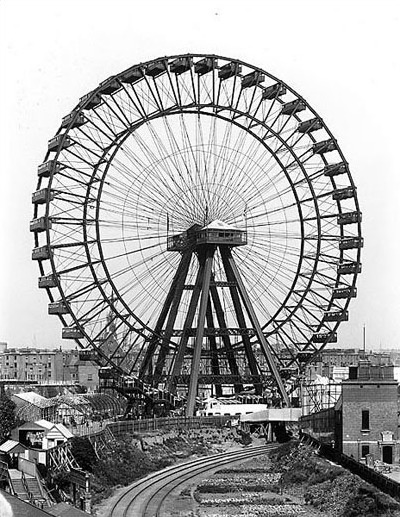
- The Great Wheel at Earl's Court Exhibition Ground

Overview
- BIE-class: Unrecognized exposition
- Name: Imperial Austrian Exhibition
- Area: Earl's Court

Location
- City: London

Timeline
- Opening: 20 June 1906
- Closure: 6 October 1906

The Imperial Austrian Exhibition world's fair was held at Earl's Court in London in 1906. It opened on 20 June and closed on 6 October.

== Exhibitions and attractions ==
Three aspects of Austrian society were explored in different themed areas:

- There was a "Tyrolean Village" with lacemakers, woodcarvers, beer halls and cafes
- A model underground salt mine reached by a slide
- A Bohemia area opened by the Bohemian revivalist Count Lützow

Exhibitors included the photographer Josef Jindřich Šechtl, and the bronze goods manufacturer Kalmar who won a bronze prize. There was also an Austrian restaurant.

The exhibition was the last use of the Great Wheel, a 94.5-metre (310 ft) tall Ferris wheel which was the world's tallest from its opening in 1895 until 1900. It was demolished in 1907.

== See also ==
- General Land Centennial Exhibition (1891)
- Franco-British Exhibition (1908)
- Japan–British Exhibition (1910)
