= Empire of India Exhibition =

Exhibition in England in 1895

Coordinates: 51.489°N 0.200°W

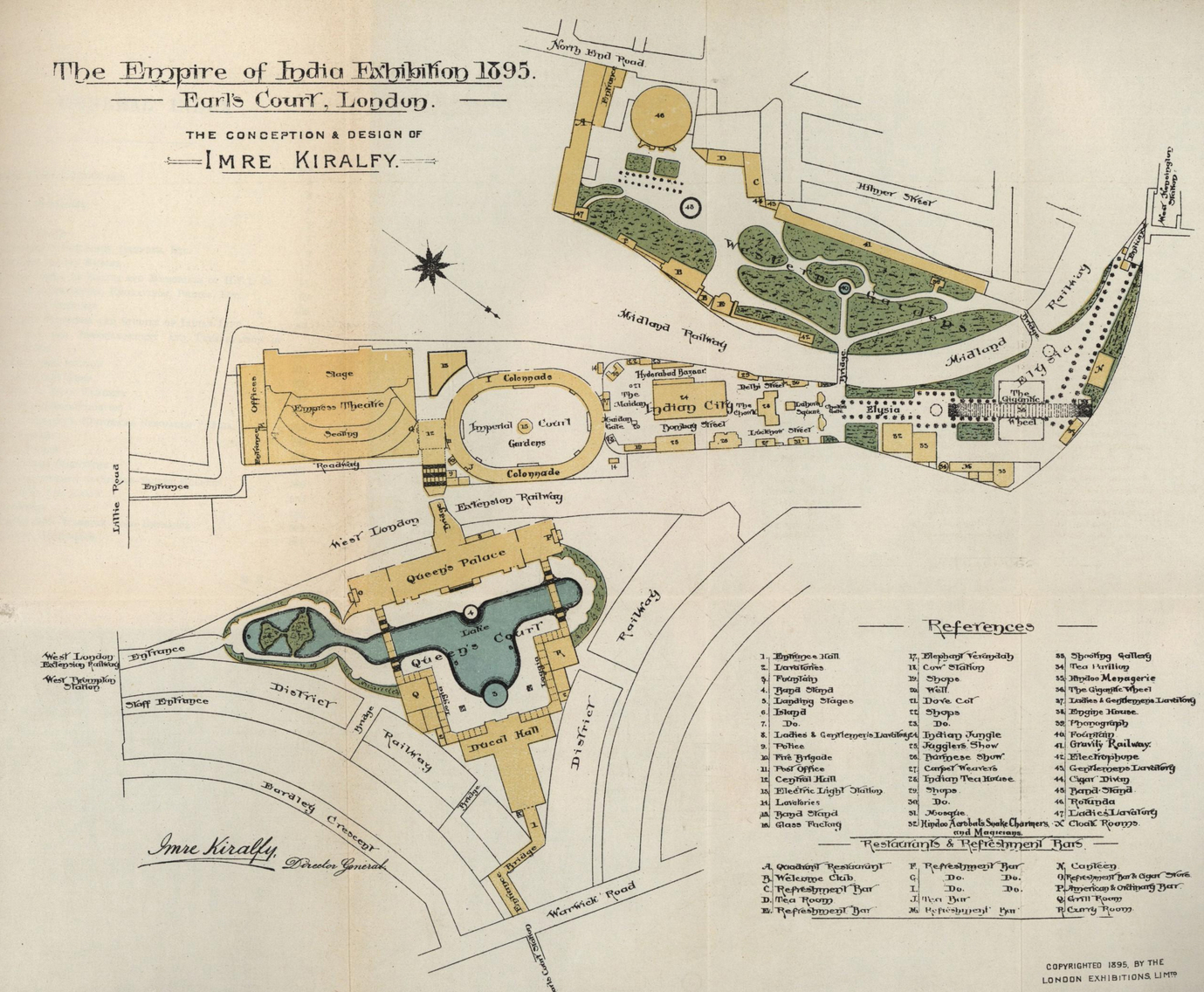
Plan of the exhibition from the official catalogue

The Empire of India Exhibition took place at Earls Court in London in 1895. Indian scenery was reproduced and there were displays which reflected the country's past and present states. The overall theme was that modern India was the product of British patience and genius. It was organised by Imre Kiralfy.

It featured the Great Wheel.
