= Earls Court Boat Show =

Coordinates: 51°29′20″N 0°11′52″W

The Earls Court Boat Show was first held in December 2007 at the Earls Court Exhibition Centre. This venue had previously hosted the long-established London Boat Show until its move to London's ExCeL Exhibition Centre in 2004.

The new commercial Earls Court Show is entirely separate from the London Boat Show.

The 2007 Earls Court Boat Show took place between 1–9 December 2007. It was the 50th boat show to be held in the exhibition centre.

In 2008, the show rebranded as the Sail, Power & Watersports Show at Earls Court.
