= Oil print process =

Photographic printmaking process

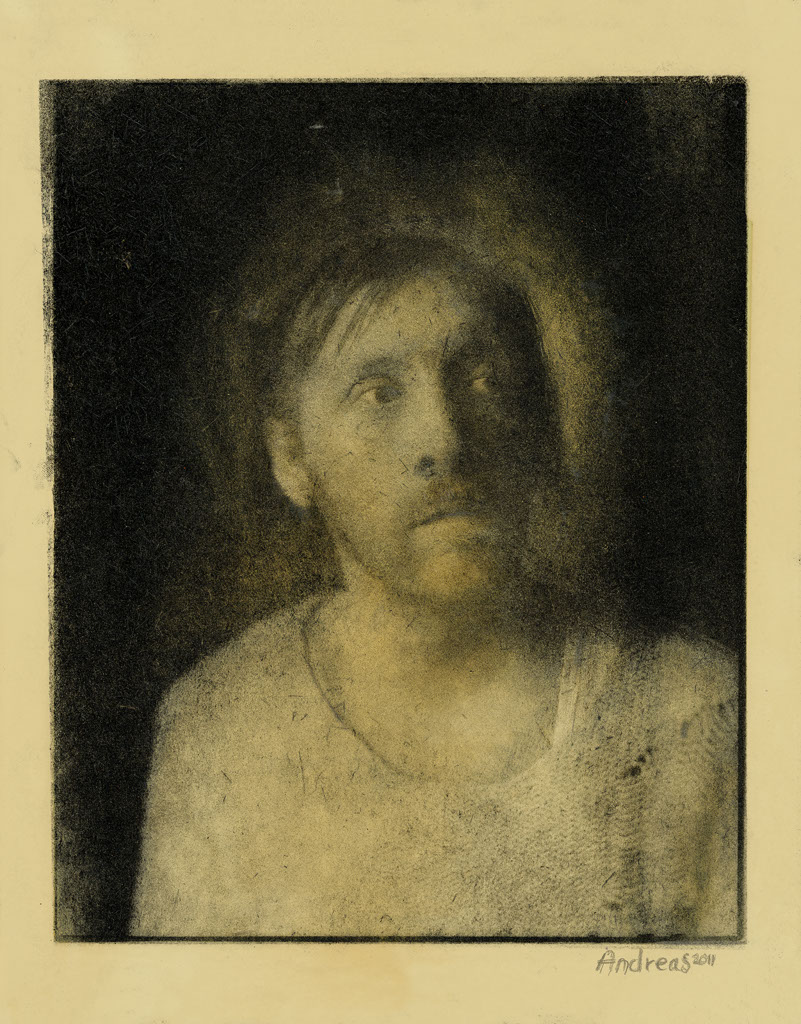
Bromoil portrait of the Norwegian painter Andreas Jacobsen. Made by Erik Hattrem from 4x5" Kodak plus-x on Fomabrom IV123 paper

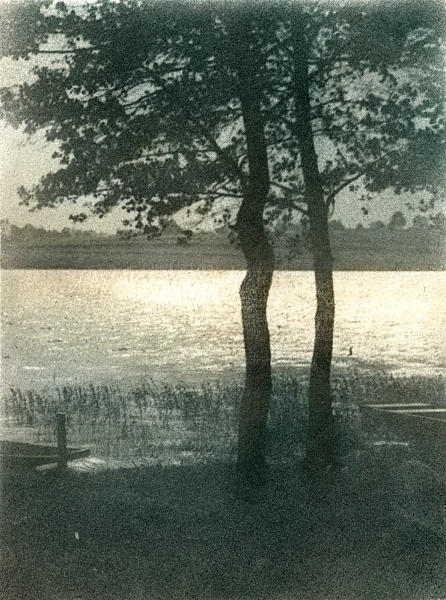
Bromoil print by Josef Jindřich Šechtl, 1920s

The oil print process is a photographic printmaking process introduced by G. E. H. Rawlins in 1904, based on the behavior of bichromated gelatin described by Alphonse Louis Poitevin in the 1850s. Oil prints are made on paper on which a thick gelatin layer has been sensitized to light using dichromate salts. After the paper is exposed to light through a negative, the gelatin emulsion is treated in such a way that highly exposed areas take up an oil-based paint, forming the photographic image.

A significant drawback to the oil print process is that it requires the negative to be the same size as the final print because the medium is not sensitive enough to light to make use of an enlarger. A subtype of the oil print process, the bromoil process, was developed in the early 20th century to solve this problem.

The oil print and bromoil processes create soft images reminiscent of paint or pastels but with the distinctive indexicality of a photograph. For this reason, they were popular with the Pictorialists during the first half of the 20th century. The painterly qualities of the prints continue to appeal to artists and have recently led some contemporary art photographers to take up these processes again.

== Oil print techniques ==
The origins of the oil print process go back to experiments by Alphonse Louis Poitevin with bichromated gelatin in the 1850s. A practical oil printing method was introduced by G. E. H. Rawlins in 1904. The ink was at first applied with rollers, but these were soon replaced by brushes, which allowed the printer to put more or less ink on different parts of the print; this control over the final image appealed to photographers who wanted to work on their prints by hand.

To make an oil print, a piece of paper is coated with a thick gelatin layer containing dichromate salts that sensitize it to light. A contact print is made by laying a negative over the paper and exposing it to light, which leads to hardening of the dichromated gelatin in proportion to the amount of light that reaches the paper. After exposure, the print is soaked in water and the non-hardened areas absorb more water than the hardened parts. The sponge-dried but still moist paper is then inked with an oil-based ink, which sticks preferentially to the hardened (drier) areas. The result is a positive image in the color of the ink. As with other forms of printmaking, the ink application requires considerable skill, and no two prints are identical.

Multicolor oil prints are possible through local inking of the print, and it is also possible to create reverse prints by contact-printing the wet oil print to a piece of plain paper. Artists have also sometimes created variations by applying extra paint using brushes. In the later 19th century, it was possible to buy commercially prepared gelatin-coated paper.

=== Bromoil process ===
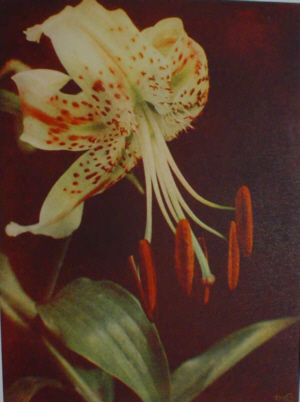
Goldbandlilie, 1932, a 4-color bromoil-transfer by F. Rontag

The bromoil process is a variation on the oil print process that allows for enlargements. In 1907, E. J. Wall described how it should theoretically be possible to place a negative in an enlarger to produce a larger silver bromide positive, which would then be bleached, hardened, and inked following the oil print process. That same year C. Welborne Piper worked out the practical details. Much as Wall envisioned it, the bromoil process starts with a normally developed print exposed onto a silver-bromide paper that is then chemically bleached, hardened, and fixed. When the still-moist print is inked, the hardest (driest) areas take up the most ink while the wettest areas become the highlights.

An issue with the bromoil process is that inadequate rinsing of the chrome salts can lead to discoloration of the prints when exposed to light over long periods of time. In addition, irregularities in the thickness of the gelatin layer can, under unfavorable conditions, lead to stresses that damage the pictorial (ink) layer.

A version of the bromoil process was developed to produce full-color prints in the 1930s before commercial color film was developed. This technique requires three matching negatives of the subject, each made on Ilford Hypersensitive Panchromatic plates and shot through a blue, green, and red filter. The developed plates are enlarged and printed onto separate pieces of bromide-silver photographic paper, which are then bleached and hardened in the usual manner. The three prints are then inked with a firm bromoil ink, yellow on the blue-filtered print, red on the green-filtered print, and blue on the red-filtered print. The three inked prints are then treated as printing plates and passed through an etching press that will transfer the ink to a new piece of paper or cloth, reversing the image in the process. Care must be taken to maintain exact registration of the three plates.

== See also ==
- Carbon print
