= Chromophotography =

Technique of Painting and Photography

Chromophotography is a technique, somewhere between painting and photography, which evolved in the second half of the 19th century. Firstly, two prints of the photograph were made. One was hand-painted with very bright colours; the other was painted in paler colours, and then made translucent by applying wax to the paper. The second picture was then superimposed over the first, with a small air gap in between, resulting in a three-dimensional effect. This technique was used by only a very few photographers, mostly in Central Europe.

In Bohemia (now the Czech Republic), one of the best known exponents of this technique was Alexander Seik.

In New Zealand, Gisborne photographer C. P. Browne advertised Chromo Photography in 1883.

However, the word chromophotography was used in several different ways during the 19th century and it cannot be assumed that a reference automatically refers to the technique described here. Messers Porter and Cann were advertising "Chromo-Photographic Portraiture" in the Bury and Norwich Post of 2 August 1854, which clearly relates to painting colour on photographs and by 1856 several photographers were using the term in their adverts, although this use did not catch on. This pre-dates by 8 years the first reference to the new invention called "chromo-photography" by M. Albert, photographer to the Court in Munich reported in the South London Chronicle of 10 May 1862. The term "Chromo-photography" was also used to describe a very different photographic technique using chromic acid described in Dr. Hermann Wilhelm Vogel's book The Chemistry of Light and Photography as reviewed in The Examiner of 24 July 1875. In 1882 and 1883 adverts appeared in the press where shops specialising in drawing and painting materials referred to materials for "Chromo-photography" but there is nothing in the advertisements to suggest that this involved anything more than the commonplace tinting of photographs.

It is not clear when the European technique was first used in England. The Bucks Free Press of 2 September 1870 carried an advertisement by the photographer Laz Roberts which said "he is working on entirely new process of his own, Chromophotography, and taking life-like CdVs in Natural Colours", but it is not certain what technique he was using.

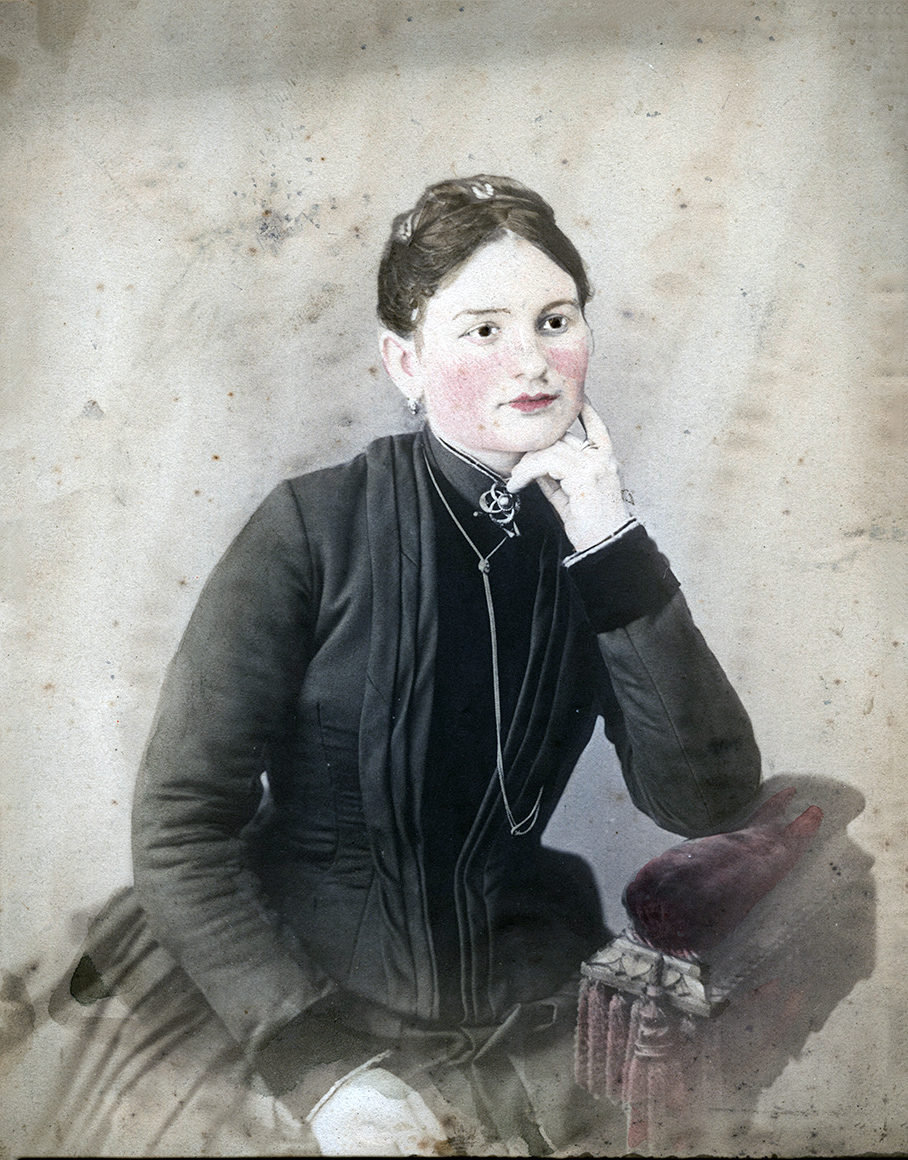
The bottom layer of an Alexander Seik chromophotograph. The photograph has been printed on salt paper, with heavy colouring. The border is made from cardboard, to maintain an air gap between the two layers.

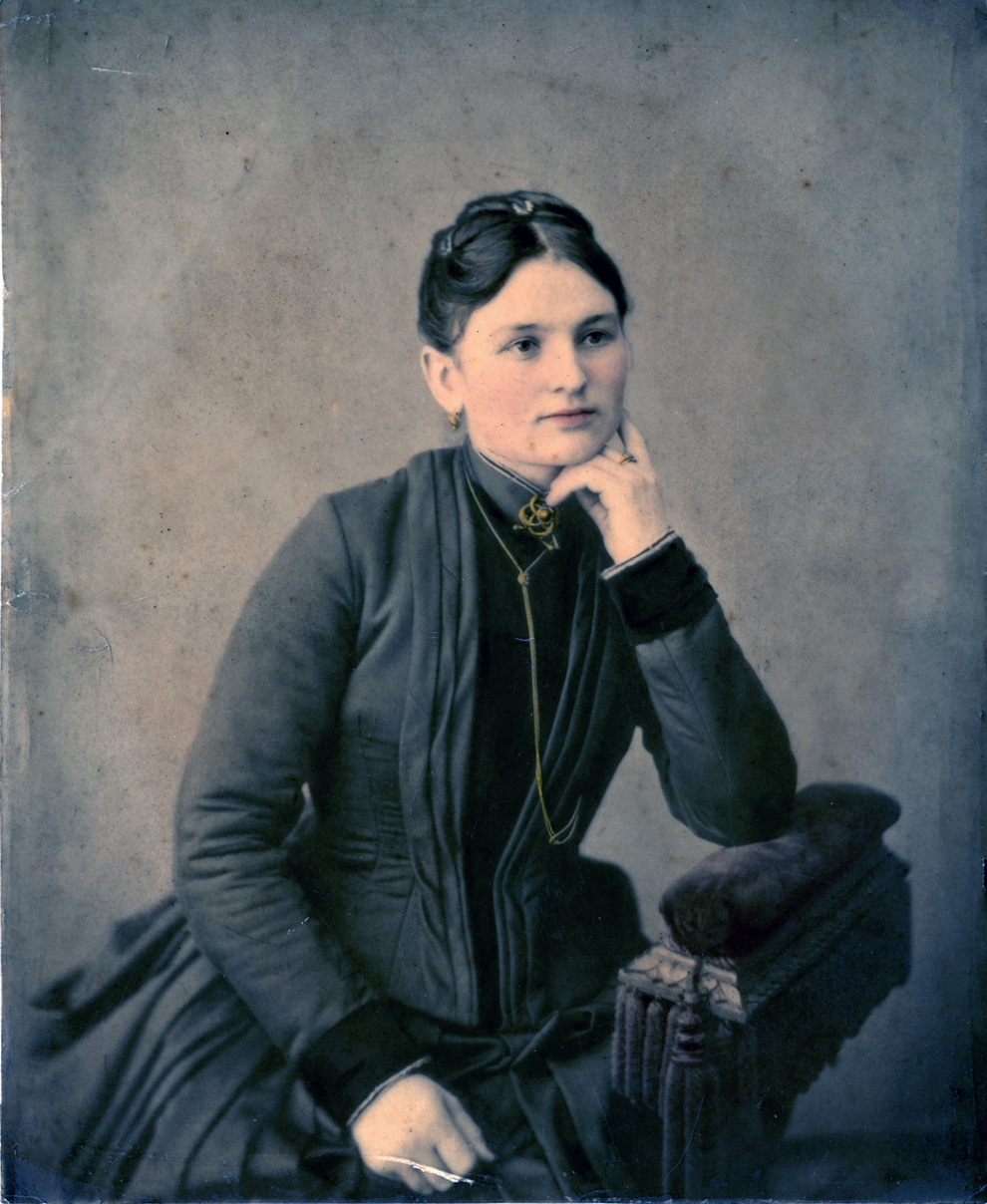
The top layer of the chromophotograph has been made translucent by treating the paper with wax. Either salt or albumen paper may have been used for this top layer. The colouring on the top layer is not typical for chromophotographs by other photographers. The chromophotograph was originally mounted in a decorative frame, with an oval mask.

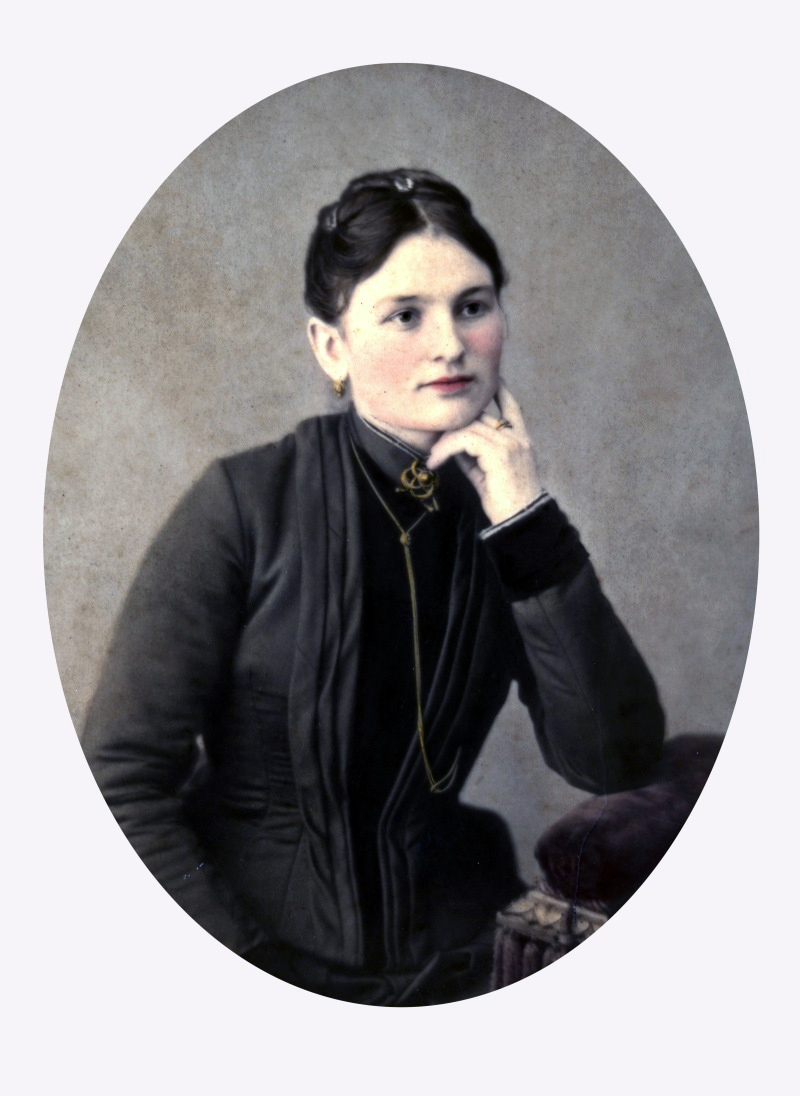
The original chromophotograph has deteriorated, due to yellowing of the paper. This picture is an attempt to reconstruct the original look of chromophotography, using modern Photoshop technology. First, both layers were colour balanced to remove the yellow cast; then the bottom layer was unsharpened to simulate diffusion by the paper; and finally, the upper layer was made 30% translucent.
