= Ignác Šechtl =

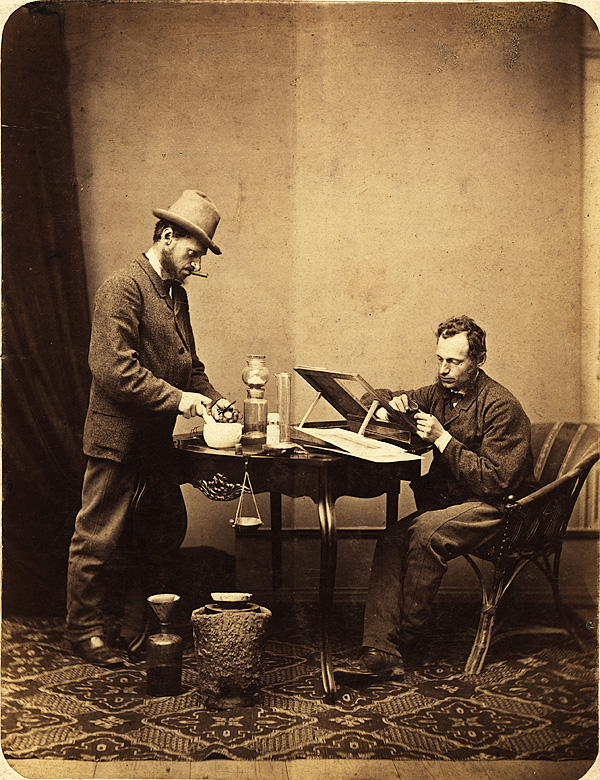
The double self-portrait of Ignác Šechtl, 1870

Ignác Šechtl (26 May 1840 – 6 July 1911), also known as Ignace Schächtl or Hynek Šechtl, was a pioneer of Czech photography (especially photojournalism) and cinematography. He moved from Prague, to Kladno, Plzeň, Bucharest, Prachatice and Nepomuk, and finally to Tábor, where he established the photographic firm Šechtl and Voseček, which survived for three generations.

== Biography ==
Ignác Šechtl was born in Prague, on 26 May 1840, into the family of a miller. His father intended him to become a trader, and his first job was administrator for the business of Alexander Klier, in Prague. In 1863 he moved to Kladno, to learn the art of photography, and in 1865 he was granted tradesman's rights. Only a few of his cartes de visite remain from that time, and these are now stored in the family archive.

In 1864, he moved to Plzeň, and opened his studio, the fourth in the town. Contemporary newspapers mention his photographing of the unveiling of the memorial to sculptor Wiltd, and describe it as being successful in spite of the inclement weather on the day. This is the first mention of Ignác Šechtl's outdoor work.

In 1868, he went into partnership with photographer Franz Bergman. The two men later had a falling out, after which Šechtl and his wife Antonia left Plzeň and he became an itinerant photographer. He tried his luck in Bucharest in 1871, and in Nepomuk and Prachatice. Several significant photographs remain from this period. One unique work that has survived is a photomontage, achieved by double exposure, depicting Ignác Šechtl both as laboratory worker and retouching a photo, in one picture. Also interesting are photos of towns, for example, shots of Prachatice, Jistebnice, Tábor, Žirovnice and a panoramic photograph of Blatná.

In 1870, Ignác's daughter Antonia was born. Four years later, his wife Antonia died. Later, on trips to Tábor, he met Catherine Štastná, housekeeper of Josef Němec, the husband of famous writer, Božena Němcová. Catherine later became his second wife. At 36, Šechtl finally settled in Tábor, and officially opened his studio in 1876, at house number 333 on Maria Square.

His son, Josef Jindřich, was born in 1877. Family tradition says that the same day, in a pub, Šechtl met the commercial traveller Jan Voseček, who very soon became a partner in the firm. The 1880 census reveals Voseček as Šechtl's assistant.

Ignác documented with passion the evolution of the town of Tábor, even though he lost money on this work. From the years 1876–77, several photos remain of Tábor Square shortly after the renovation of the Town Hall, and a photo-essay documenting the unveiling of the Jan Žižka Memorial by sculptor Josef Václav Myslbek.

In 1878, the weekly newspaper Český Jih announced the founding of the partnership of Alexander Seik and Ignác Šechtl. Some of the photos from this time bear the logo of both photographers, while others show individual logos. However, Seik was losing interest in photography and was turning his attention to politics, so around 1886 the partnership came to an end. However, the separation of the two studios does not appear to have damaged Šechtl's business.

Ignác Šechtl was a founding member of the Fishermen's Club, and he was also a popular amateur actor. It is said that the audience laughed as soon as Ignác appeared on stage. His experience as an actor, his wit, and his sense of theatre, are apparent in many of his photos.

Jan Voseček started his work with Šechtl in the former Seik studio in 1888. We have photos signed by Voseček from this time. He became a partner in the firm "Schächtl and Voseček", later changed to the Czech spelling of "Šechtl and Voseček".

In 1896, Ignác Šechtl discovered a new passion – cinematography. He held the first licence in Bohemia for showing moving pictures. What would have been the first showing in Bohemia was scheduled for Plzeň, in 1896. However, due to technical difficulties at Plzeň, it appears the first-ever showing was in fact, by Ignác Šechtl, in the Shooting Gallery in Tábor, in 1897. However, Ignác Šechtl was dissatisfied with the technical quality, and he travelled to Vienna to try to solve these problems. He became an itinerant cinematographer, but the business kept losing money, and finally, he sold it to the magician, Viktor Ponrepo.

In 1902, the firm Šechtl and Voseček exhibited at the great Regional Exhibition in Tábor. Ignác, with his son Josef Jindřich, created a large photo-essay of the Exhibition, which survives to this day. He also documented the building of the Bechyně Railway in 1903, and many Sokol meets. In 1904, his son Josef became a full partner in the firm. In 1906, the firm opened a branch in Pelhřimov, and also exhibited at the Austrian Exhibition in London. In 1907 they started building a new studio, in the place of the former Seik studio, which became the largest in southern Bohemia.

Ignác Šechtl died on 6 July 1911. The firm Šechtl and Voseček survived, until nationalisation by the Communist government in 1953.
