= Marie Šechtlová =

Czech photographer (1928–2008)

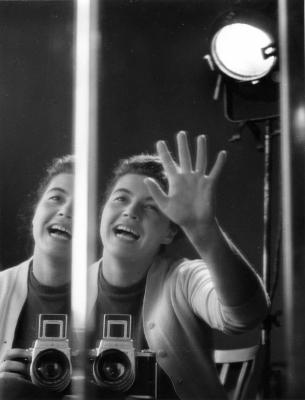
Marie Šechtlová's photograph:self-portrait

Marie Šechtlová (25 March 1928 Chomutov – 5 July 2008 Prague) was a Czech photographer, one of the proponents of the "poetry of everyday" style.

== Chronology ==
Year	
1928 (25.3)	Marie Kokešová born in Chomutov, daughter of clerk Jan Kokeš and his wife Františka.
1938	Kokeš family moved to Tábor.
1947	Marie matriculated from Tábor High School.
1948 (15.5)	Married Josef Šechtl.
1950	Completed apprenticeship in photography, at photographic studio of Šechtl and Voseček in Tábor (founded 1876).
1952 (17.3)	Daughter Marie Michaela born.
1953	Šechtl and Voseček studio nationalised by the Communist government.
1958	Movie “Moon” presented at UNICA international festival, in Ems, Germany.
1961	Series of photographs accompanying poem by Jan Noha, published in “Photography Revue”. Nominated for membership of Union of Czechoslovak Artists.
1963	Trip to Moscow, Leningrad and Kiev with group of professional Czech artists.
1964	Trips to Estonia, Lithuania, Latvia, and United States.
1965	Admitted to Membership of Union of Czechoslovak Artists.
1967	Marie Šechtlová's hands severely burned by X-rays in medical accident.
1975	Participation in competition, “Woman Behind the Camera” (in years 1975, 1976 and 1977).
1989	Books “Paris”, with text by Jiří Mucha, and “Historical Firearms”, were prepared for printing, but because of political upheavals, were never published. Exhibition “Anthology”, in Tábor.
2008	(July 5) Died in Prague.

=== Awards ===
- 1957 Marie Šechtlová and Josef Šechtl won second prize in national amateur movie competition, in the category “Movie Poetry”, for the movie “Moon”.
- 1960 First prize in national competition of Photography Association, in Artistic Photography category, for the cycle “Come to Mama, Darling”.
- 1961 First and second prizes in competition of Photography Association for the series “Almanac 1960”, and for “Boys of Our Street”.
- 1962 First prize at Exhibition of Czechoslovak Art Photography in Sevastopol. First prize in Reportage category for the series “One to Another”, in competition of Photography Association.
- 1963 First prize for a series of photographs, “The Face of the Earth”. First prize for a series of photographs, “Rain Song”, in exhibition “Great Friendship”.
- 1965 Third and fourth prizes in Photographic Art competition in East Germany.
- 1965 Special prize in competition in magazine “Mladý svět”, “Unknown Beauties of Czechoslovakia”, prize a two-week trip to East Germany and Denmark.

=== Exhibitions ===
- 1961 First exhibition in ZK Jiskra, in Tábor.
- 1961 Exhibition in Halle, Germany.
- 1963 Exhibitions in Kunštát Palace in Brno; in Chrudim; in Uherské Hradiště; in Luhačovice; and in Gottwaldow.
- 1964 Exhibition and catalogue in House of Arts in České Budějovice; in Tábor; in Soběslav; and in Písek.
- 1965 Exhibition in Mladá Fronta gallery in Prague. Exhibition “Wystawa Fotografiky Marii Šechtlovej”, in [Warsaw], [Poland].
- 1966 Exhibition in Brussels.
- 1966 Traveling exhibition in Cairo, Alexandria and Berlin.
- 1966 Exhibitions in [Paris], and in [České Budějovice]. Exhibition “South Bohemia” in Moscow, Leningrad, Kiev and Tábor.
- 1967 First joint exhibition of Marie and Josef Šechtl in Prague and other cities.
- 1967 Exhibition of Marie Šechtlová and A. Robinsonová in Alexandria and Cairo, Egypt.
- 1967 Exhibitions in Cheb, and in Vimperk.
- 1979 Exhibition M. and J. Šechtl in Tábor theatre.
- 1980 Exhibition “Metamorphoses of Tábor from Archive of Three Generations”, in Tábor Cultural Centre.
- 1982 Exhibition “Colour Photography”, by M. and J. Šechtl in Písek District Museum.
- 1987 Exhibition “Colour Photography”, in Dačice.
- 2003 Exhibition “Review and Dreamy Return, Photos and Computer Graphics of M. Šechtlová”, in Sezimovo Ústí.
- 2005 Exhibition “Five Generations of Šechtl Family, Photography and Graphics”, in Písek Museum.
- 2006 Exhibition “Five Generations of Šechtl Family”, in [Prostějov].
- 2007 Exhibition “Marie Šechtlová: Photographic stories“ in Šechtl and Voseček Museum of Photography in Tábor and Médiathèque Dole in France.
- 2008 Exhibition “Marie Šechtlová: Life with Photography“ in Šechtl and Voseček Museum of Photography in Tábor.
- 2010 Exhibition “Marie Šechtlová: Photography 1960-1970" in Leica Gallery Prague in Prague.
- 2010 Exhibition "Marie Šechtlová: Czech in the U.S." in American center in Prague in Prague.
- 2010 Exhibition "Marie Šechtlová & Josef Šechtl, Life with Photography." in Municipak Museum in Blatná in Blatná.

== Publications ==
- Štych, Jiří, Děti kapitána Kohla: reportáž z nedávné minulosti České Budéjovice: Krajské nakladatelství České Buďéjovice 1961.
- (in Czech) Noha, Jan; Šechtlová, Marie, Všechny oči, Prague: Státní nakladatelství 1964.
- (in Czech) Noha, Jan; Šechtlová, Marie, Praha na listu růže, Prague: Orbis 1966.
- (in Czech) Holub, Miroslav; Fuková, Eva; Novotný, Miloň, New York, Prague: Mladá fronta 1966.
- (in Czech) et al., Ze Šrámkova Písku Písek, Městský národní výbor 1967.
- (in Czech) Mixa, Robert; Bauerl Jan, Šechtlová, Marie, Tábor a okolí, České Budějovice: Nakladatelství České Buďějovice 1967.
- (in Czech) Kožík František; Šechtlová, Marie; Šechtl, Josef, Praha, Prague: pressfoto 1972.
- (in Czech) Grünfeld, Josef; Šechtlová, Marie; et al., Jindřichohradecko, Jindřichův Hradec: Okresní národní výbor 1973.
- (in Czech) Michl, Karel; Šechtlová, Marie; Šechtl, Josef, Hradec Králové: k sedmsetpadesátému výročí zalození města a třicátému výroči osvobození sovětskou armádou v roce MCMLXXV, Hradec Králové, Osveta 1976.
- (in Czech) Stehlíková, Blanka, Leningrad Prague: Odeon 1977.
- (in Czech) Malík, Jan; Dvořák, J., V.; Šechtlová, Marie, Šechtl, Josef, Svét loutek: loutky ze sbírek Muzea loutkářských kultur v Chrudimi, Hradec Králové: Kruh 1978.
- (in Czech) Drda, Miloš; Šechtlová, Marie; Šechtl, Josef, Muzeum husitského revolučního hnutí v Táboře: expozice husité, Prague: Pressfoto 1979.
- (in Czech) Korčák, Pavel; et al.; Šechtlová, Marie; Šechtl, Josef., Tábor: Národní kulturní památka, Praha: Panorama 1979.
- (in Czech) Svatoň, Jaroslav; Josef Šechtl; Šechtlová, Marie, Tábor: Národní kulturní památka, Tábor: Okresní národní výbor 1979.
- (in Czech) Marhoun, Jan, Jitex - 30 let práce pro socialismus, Praha: Práce 1979.
- (in Czech) Collective from art-history department of Regional center for historical care and preservation of nature in České Budějovice, Jihočeská klenotnice České Budéjovice: Jihočeské nakladatelství 1981.
- (in Czech) Štara, Antonín; Šechtlová, Marie, Galerie Klenová Prague: Pressfoto 1981.
- (in Czech) Kuthan, Jiří; Horyna, Mojmír; Muchka, Ivan; Šechtlová, Marie; Šechtl, Josef, Jižní Čechy: krajina, historie, umělecké památky, Prague: Panorama 1982.
- (in Czech) Klíma, Jaroslav; Texler, Václav; Postl, Radomír; Šechtlová, Marie; Šechtl, Josef, Písek a Písecko, Písek: Městské kulturní středisko 1983.
- (in Czech) Šmejkal, František, Zdeněk Sklenář, Prague: Odeon 1984.
- (in Czech) Krajný, Miroslav; Karel Stehlík, Prague: Odeon 1986.
- (in Czech) Hotmar, Josef; Kuna, Jaroslav; Šechtlová, Marie, Rendezvou s Paříží, Prague: Odeon 1988.
- (in Czech) Šechtlová, Marie; Šechtl, Josef, Pelhřimov Prague: ČTK-Pressfoto, 1992.
- (in Czech) Tecl, Rudolf; Šechtlová, Marie; Šechtl, Josef, Tábor Prague: ČTK-Pressfoto, 1992.
- (in Czech) Bumerl, Jiří; Čap, Josef; Šechtlová, Marie; Šechtl, Josef, Jordán 1492-1992: Tábor: hráz Tábor: Okresní úřad, 1992.
- (in Czech) Trčka, Miroslav; Šechtlová, Marie; Šechtl, Josef, Hrady a zámky Jižních Čech Prague: ČTK-Pressfoto, 1993.
- (in Czech) Trčka, Miroslav; Šechtlová, Marie; Šechtl, Josef, Hrady a zámky Jižních Čech České Budějovice: ATIKA, 1994.
- (in Czech) Froněk, Miroslav; Šechtlová, Marie; et al., Vítejte na Prachaticku Prachatice: Region Prachatice, 1997.
