= Jivno =

- Municipality
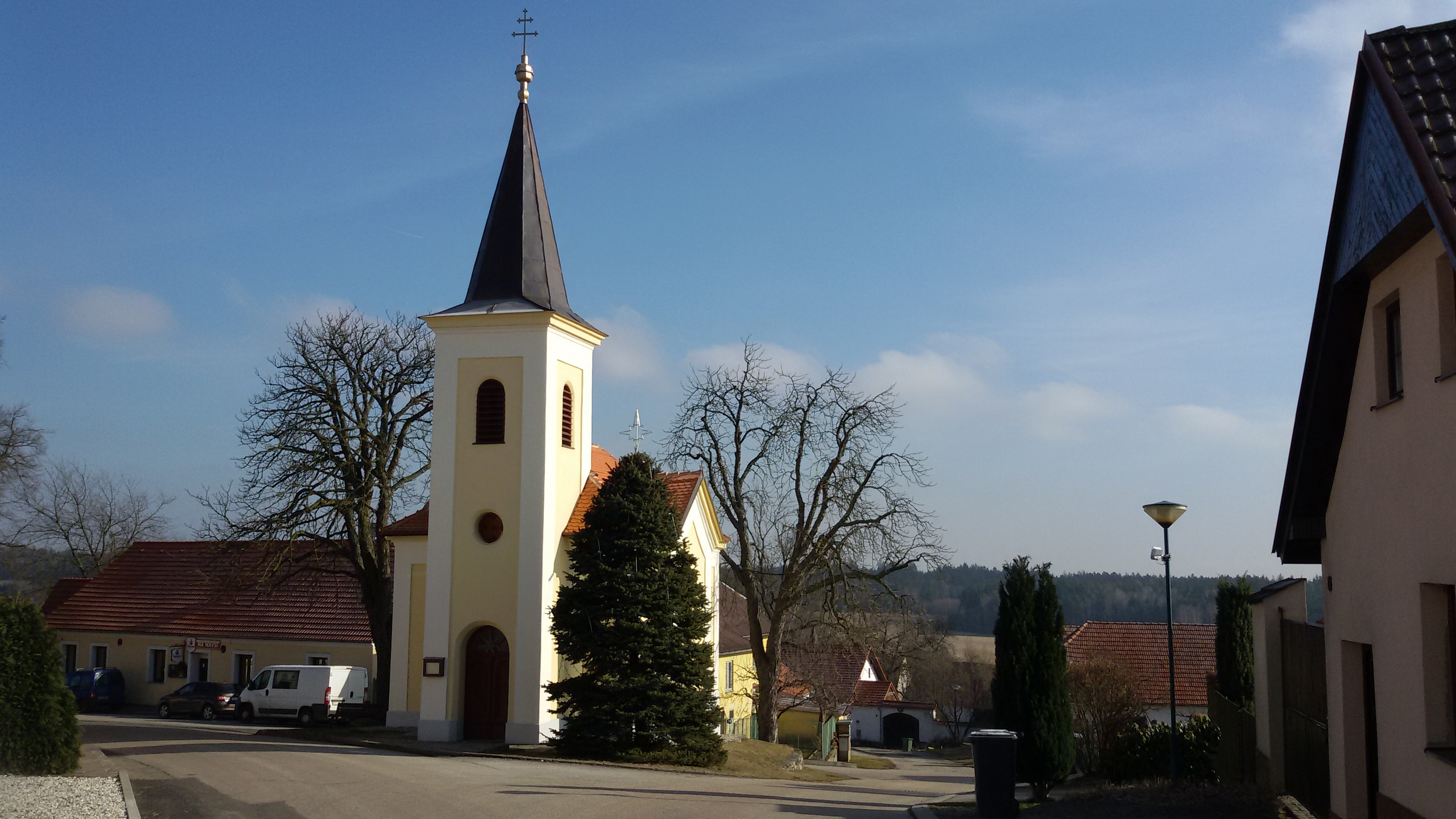
- Chapel of Saint Adalbert

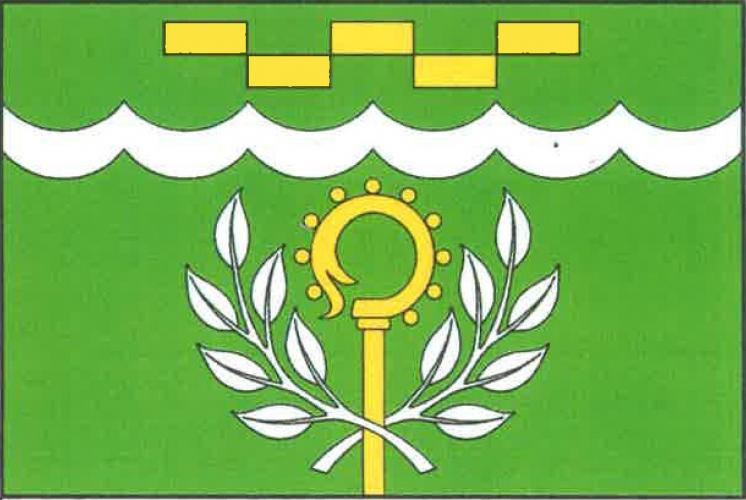
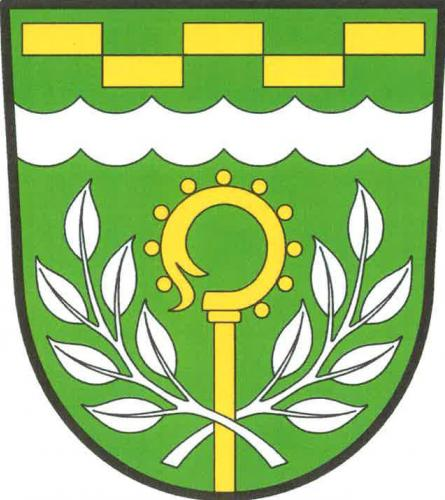
- Flag Coat of arms

- Location in the Czech Republic
- Coordinates: 48°59′44″N 14°34′9″E
- Country: Czech Republic
- Region: South Bohemian
- District: České Budějovice
- First mentioned: 1378

Area
  - Total: 6.29 km^{2} (2.43 sq mi)
- Elevation: 554 m (1,818 ft)

Population (2026-01-01)
  - Total: 423
  - Density: 67.2/km^{2} (174/sq mi)
- Time zone: UTC+1 (CET)
  - Summer (DST): UTC+2 (CEST)
- Postal code: 373 71
- Website: www.jivno.cz

Jivno is a municipality and village in České Budějovice District in the South Bohemian Region of the Czech Republic. It has about 400 inhabitants.

Jivno lies approximately 8 kilometres (5 mi) east of České Budějovice and 122 km (76 mi) south of Prague.

== Demographics ==
Historical population
| Year | Pop. | ±% |
|---|---|---|
| 1869 | 303 | — |
| 1880 | 301 | −0.7% |
| 1890 | 327 | +8.6% |
| 1900 | 297 | −9.2% |
| 1910 | 307 | +3.4% |
| 1921 | 288 | −6.2% |
| 1930 | 247 | −14.2% |
| 1950 | 195 | −21.1% |
| 1961 | 186 | −4.6% |
| 1970 | 168 | −9.7% |
| 1980 | 158 | −6.0% |
| 1991 | 134 | −15.2% |
| 2001 | 173 | +29.1% |
| 2011 | 284 | +64.2% |
| 2021 | 426 | +50.0% |
Source: Censuses
