= Great Wheel =

Former ferris wheel in London, England

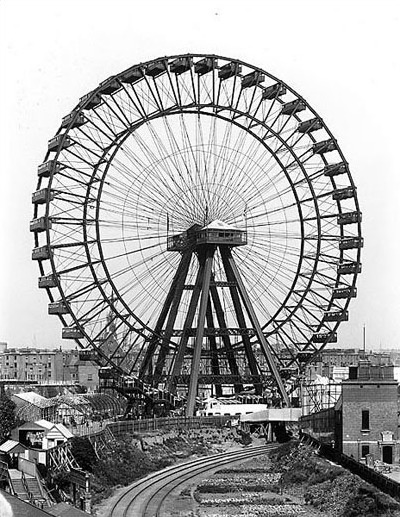
- Interactive map of the Great Wheel area

General information
- Location: Earls Court, London
- Coordinates: 51.48835°N 0.19889°W
- Construction started: 1894
- Opening: 17 July 1895
- Demolished: 1907
- Owner: The Gigantic Wheel and Recreational Towers Company

Height
- Height: 94 m (308 ft)

Design and construction
- Structural engineer: Adam Gaddelin and Gareth Watson
- Main contractor: Maudslay, Sons and Field

The Great Wheel, also known as the Gigantic Wheel, or Graydon Wheel, was built for the Empire of India Exhibition at Earls Court, London, in the United Kingdom. Construction began in March 1894 at the works of Maudslay, Sons and Field in Greenwich and it opened to the public on 17 July 1895. Modelled on the original Ferris Wheel which featured at the 1893 World's Columbian Exposition in Chicago, US, it was 94 metres (308 ft) tall and 82.3 metres (270 ft) in diameter. and weighed about 900 tons. It stayed in service until 1906, by which time its 40 cars (each with a capacity of 30 persons) had carried over 2.5 million passengers. It was demolished in 1907 following its last use with the Imperial Austrian Exhibition of 1906 as it was no longer profitable to run.

| Preceded by Ferris Wheel | World's tallest Ferris wheel 1895–1900 | Succeeded by Grande Roue de Paris |
