= Alexander Seik =

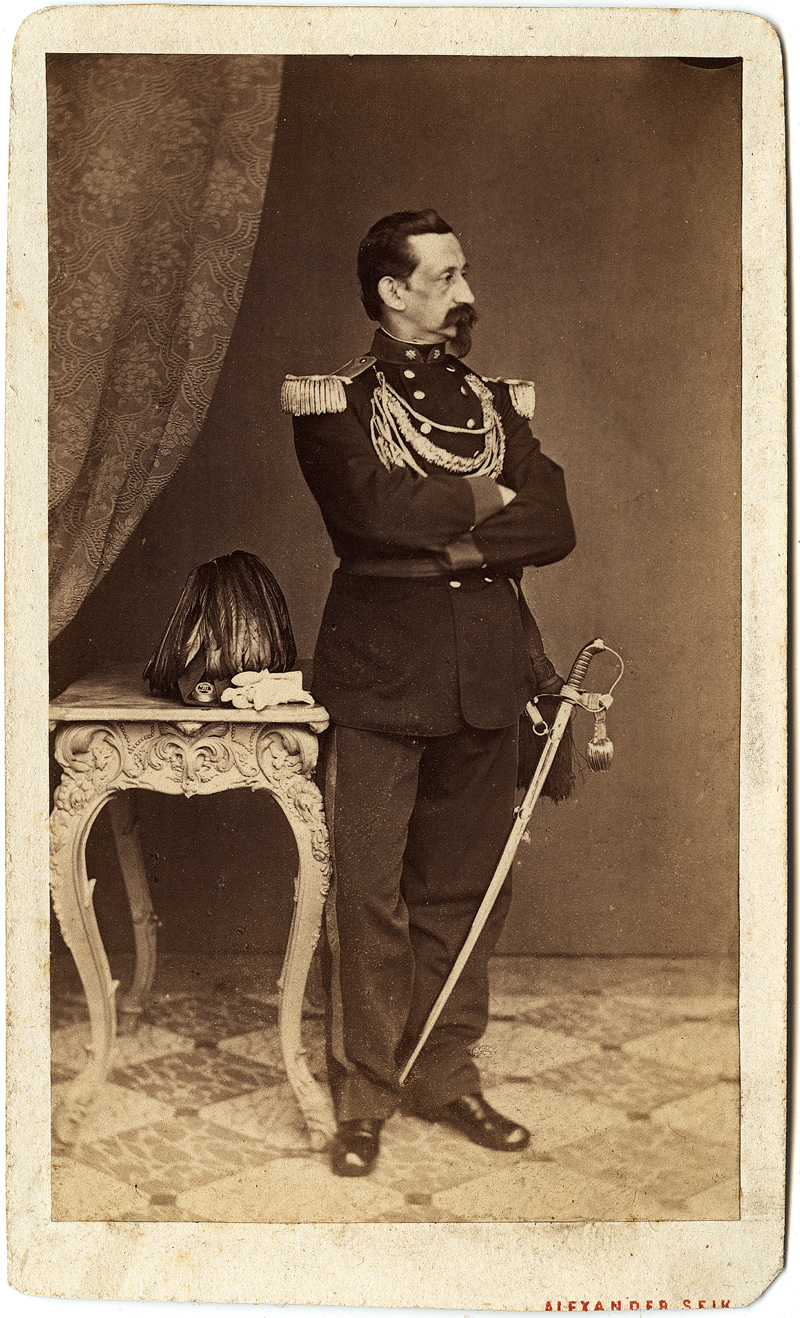
Self portrait of Alexander Seik in sharpshooter uniform, 1869

Alexander Seik (also known as Alex Sejk; 6 September 1824 – 2 October 1905) was a Czech photographer, painter and mayor of Tábor. He was a pioneer of Czech photography, one of foremost exponents of chromophotography.

== Biography ==
Alexander Seik was born in Mirotice near Písek, Austrian Empire (today the Czech Republic). Like many other early photographers, he started out as a portrait painter. On 1 June 1855, he opened a studio in Mladá Vožice, thus becoming one of the original Czech photographers.

In 1855, he moved to Tábor. His studio, where the Hotel Palcát now stands, became very popular. Most of his work was making portraits, mostly in Carte de visite format. He also experimented with outdoor photography – at that time, an immensely difficult task. In 1860, he sold to the town of Tábor, a photograph of the town, for 26 gold pieces, which was equivalent to a typical month’s salary for a teacher. Customers flocked to Seik's studio in Tábor from surrounding towns, even those that had their own photographic studios. The oldest known preserved photographs are hand-colored salt paper prints, now stored in the Práchenské muzeum in Písek, of the parents of August Sedláček, dated to 1858.

In 1865, Seik opened a new photographic salon, with more modern equipment, in Mr Mrazík’s house (today, opposite the theatre). After two months, however, he found that the studio lacked adequate light, and he decided to totally renovate, and re-open, his original studio.

Seik’s studio achieved international recognition during the Prussian invasion of Bohemia, in 1866. Many Prussian soldiers chose to be photographed, and then sent the portraits home, as Seik’s photographs were said to be superior to those available in Berlin. Some of those portraits are preserved in the collection at the Hussite Museum, in Tábor.

Seik often spoke about his many photographic inventions, but the details of these have not been preserved. His special interest was chromophotography – a portrait technique with a three-dimensional effect. This technique was mastered by only a few photographers, and was a specialty of Central Europe. An article in the Tábor weekly newspaper, in 1865, mentions that Seik had invented an improvement in the technique of chromophotography. Another article, by Jakub Husník in 1869, said that a Seik invention had improved photography onto porcelain.

Seik was increasingly engaged in the social life of the town, and became a member of the Sharpshooters Company in 1869, later becoming its commander in 1883. He created for the club an album of portraits of its members. This album is the largest known preserved collection of Seik's work. In 1872, he joined the Photographic Society of Vienna. He became a member of the Town Council of Tábor in 1870, and joined its Executive in 1873, with responsibility for Police.

In 1878, the weekly newspaper Český jih announced the founding of the partnership of Alexander Seik and Ignác Šechtl. Some of the photos from this time bear the logo of both photographers, while others show individual logos. However, Seik was losing interest in photography, and was turning his attention to politics, so around 1886, the partnership came to an end.

Seik became Mayor of Tábor in 1889. In the 10 years he held this position, Tábor grew and developed greatly. For example, the Church of the Transfiguration, and the Bechyňe Gate, were re-built; and the Shooting Gallery Community Centre and the Tobacco factory were built. Tábor also at this time became a significant railway centre.

The fulsome newspaper obituary thanked Seik for his services to Tábor, and stated that his untiring efforts had brought Tábor to new glory.
