= List of Beninese artists =

The following list of Beninese artists (in alphabetical order by last name) includes artists of various genres, who are notable and are either born in Benin, of Beninese descent or who produce works that are primarily about Benin.

== A ==
- Georges Adéagbo (born 1942), sculptor using found objects
- Elvire Adjamonsi (born 1971), filmmaker, actress
- Joseph Agbodjelou (1912–1999), photographer
- Leonce Raphael Agbodjelou (born 1965), photographer
- Mayeul Akpovi (born 1979), time-lapse photographer

== B ==
- Simonet Biokou, sculptor, voodoo artists

== D ==
- Calixte Dakpogan (born 1958), sculptor, installation artist
- Theodore Dakpogan, sculptor

== G ==
- Meschac Gaba (born 1961), conceptual artist based in Rotterdam and Cotonou
- Koffi Gahou (1947–2019), painter, wall tapestry artist, sculptor, actor, and director
- Luc Gnacadja (born 1958), architect

== H ==
- Romuald Hazoumè (born 1962), Beninese Yoruba sculptor

== K ==
- Dominique Kouas (born 1952), voodoo artist, sculptor

== M ==
- Emo de Medeiros (born 1979), photographer, video artist, textile artist, painter, performance artist, and sculptor; lives in Paris and in Cotonou, Benin
- Soraya Milla (born 1989), French-born of Beninese descent independent filmmaker

== P ==
- Yves Apollinaire Pede (1959–2019), voodoo artist

== S ==
- Julien Sinzogan (born 1957), painter, graphic artist

== T ==
- Cyprien Tokoudagba (1939–2012), sculptor and painter

== See also ==
- African art
- Vodun art
- List of Beninese Americans
- List of Beninese women artists
