= International Festival of Vodun Arts and Cultures =

The International Festival of Vodun Arts and Cultures, also known as the Ouidah Festival, was first held in Ouidah, Benin in February 1993, sponsored by UNESCO and the government of Benin. It celebrated the transatlantic Vodun religion, and was attended by priest and priestesses from Haiti, Cuba, Trinidad and Tobago, Brazil and the United States, as well as by government officials and tourists from Europe and the Americas. The festival was sponsored by the newly elected president of Benin, Nicéphore Soglo, who wanted to rebuild the connection with the Americas and celebrate the restoration of freedom of religion with the return to democracy. Artists from Benin, Haiti, Brazil and Cuba were given commissions to make sculptures and paintings related to Vodun and its variants in Africa and the African diaspora.

The festival was mainly commercial in nature, aiming to attract tourists and gain attention from the international art market. However, Vodun art can still be efficacious when produced for sale, and the Vodun spirits were propitiated at the start of the festival. The festival acknowledged the role of the Beninese in the slave trade, and was meant to serve a healing role and a welcoming home of the people of the African diaspora. It also tried counter the view of the Yoruba people and Yoruba religion as the main cultural origin of the diaspora, and affirm the central role of the Fon people and Vodun religion. Some of the art commissioned for the festival is displayed at sites in the city, including work by the Benin artists Cyprien Tokoudagba, Calixte Dakpogan, Theodore Dakpogan, Simonet Biokou, Dominique Kouas, and Yves Apollinaire Pede, and work of the African Diaspora artists Edouard Duval-Carrié (Haiti), José Claudio (Brazil) and Manuel Mendive (Cuba).
