= Axel Abessolo =

Cameroonian actor (born 1984)

- Born: 20 July 1984 (age 42)
- Citizenship: Cameroon
- Education: University of Yaoundé II
- Occupation: Actor

Axel Abessolo (born Abessollo René Axel; July 20, 1984) is a Cameroonian actor, in Ngoazip, in the Southern Region of Cameroon.

== Biography ==
=== Education ===
Abessolo began his primary education at the departmental school EMIA in Yaoundé, before attending the Lycée Général Leclerc in the same city, where he served as president of the school's theatre club and film club. He enrolled at ISDIG, where he obtained his baccalauréat. He then enrolled in the Faculty of Legal and Political Sciences at the University of Yaoundé II in Soa.

=== Career ===
In his teenage years, Abessolo auditioned for a short film, in which he performed alongside Yaya Mbile Bitang, a major actress and director in the African film industry. Abessolo's mentor Alain Serge Noa allowed Abessolo to further his career in acting by securing him a role in the 1988 short film titled C'est moi le père (transl. "I am the father"). In 2011, Abessolo returned to acting in the series Harragas, les brûleurs de frontières (transl. "Harragas, the border burners") by Noa. Abessolo collaborated with several well-known figures in African cinema, including Jean-Phillipe Cros, Émil Abessolo-Mbo and Daniel Ndo.

== Filmography ==
=== Films ===
- 2012: L’arme du crime by Francis Tené
- 2013: Harraga, brûleurs de frontières by Alain Serge Noa
- 2014: Claire ou l’enfant de l’amour by Mary Noëlle Nyba
- 2015: L’oeil du cyclone by Sékou Traoré
- 2015: Orly by Francis Tené
- 2016: Walls by Narcisse Wandji
- 2016: La patrie d’abord by Thierry Ntamack
- 2016: Aissa by Jean Roke Patoudem
- 2018: Le Deal by Gaby Ruben Ngounou
- 2019: Innocent by Léa Malle Franck Thierry
- 2019: LPDBS by Gaby Ruben Ngounou
- 2019: Mon sang by Blaise Ntedju
- 2019: Petit Jo by Daniel Kamwa
- 2020: La vallée des aigles by Olivier Assoua
- 2020: Forces Spéciale Africaines (FSA) by Ahed Bensouda
- 2021: Bangui unité spéciale des victimes by Elvire Adjamonsi
- 2022: Jericho by Fabrice Bekono
- 2022: On fait le point by Chantal Youdom
- 2023: Sans jugement by Gaby Ruben Ngounou

=== TV shows ===
- 2021: Madame monsieur 2 by Ebenezer Kepombia
- 2022: Madame Monsieur 3 by Ebenezer Kepombia
- 2023 : La batailles des chéries by Ebenezer Kepombia

== Awards ==
2024: Best Male Performance at the 27th Écrans Noirs Festival
