= Beninese art =

Visual arts of the Republic of Benin

Beninese art encompasses the visual arts produced in and associated with the Republic of Benin (formerly the Kingdom of Dahomey) in West Africa, from the royal court arts of the historic Fon kingdom centred on Abomey to the Yoruba-influenced traditions of the south-east and the vibrant contemporary art scene that has developed since the country's independence in 1960. Beninese art is often distinguished in scholarship from the unrelated "Benin Bronzes" tradition of the historic Kingdom of Benin, which lies in present-day Nigeria; the two share only a name, derived from the modern Republic of Benin having taken it (in place of Dahomey) in 1975.

Benin's artistic traditions are shaped by three principal cultural currents: the Fon-dominated royal court arts of Danxomè, centred on Abomey; the arts of the Yoruba (locally called Nago) and neighbouring peoples of the south-east, associated in particular with the Gelede masking tradition; and the arts and religious material culture of Vodun, the indigenous religion that originated in the region and travelled with the Atlantic slave trade to the Americas. To these have been added the Afro-Brazilian architectural and decorative traditions brought back by formerly enslaved people and their descendants returning from Brazil in the nineteenth century, and, from the late twentieth century onward, an internationally recognised contemporary art movement.

== Court arts of the Kingdom of Dahomey ==
The kings of Dahomey, who ruled from Abomey from around 1625 until French conquest in 1894, maintained royal workshops of sculptors, metalworkers, weavers and other artisans whose output documented royal history, expressed political power and served ritual functions.

=== Bas-reliefs ===
The clearest surviving expression of this court art is the series of polychrome bas-relief panels, modelled in earth and pigment, that decorated the outer walls of the royal palaces at Abomey. The reliefs, made by Fon craftsmen between roughly the mid-seventeenth and late nineteenth centuries, depict battle scenes, animals and symbols associated with individual kings and functioned as a form of pictorial chronicle and royal propaganda. A large number of these panels, along with two of the twelve original palace compounds, are preserved within the Royal Palaces of Abomey, inscribed as a UNESCO World Heritage Site in 1985; the Getty Conservation Institute worked with Benin's national heritage authorities in the 1990s to conserve dozens of severely damaged panels from the Salle des Bijoux (Hall of Jewels).

=== Metalwork ===
Fon metalworkers cast brass and bronze figures, staffs and ceremonial objects for the royal court using the lost wax (cire perdue) technique, a tradition in Abomey said to date to the seventeenth-century royal courts. Among the best-known metal forms are recades, ceremonial sceptres carried as symbols of royal or delegated authority, and asen (also spelled asin or assen), portable memorial altars raised in honour of deceased ancestors and displayed at family shrines. Metalworking families such as the Kpossou workshop of Abomey continue the tradition into the twenty-first century.

=== Appliqué textiles ===
Dahomean royal appliqué banners (drapeaux), made by cutting coloured cloth into figures and stitching them onto a plain background, were produced by specialist families attached to the Abomey court, most prominently the Yémadjé family, to whom royal commissions were traditionally reserved. The banners celebrated individual kings and depicted proverbs, animal emblems and scenes of war, often showing the reigning king in exaggerated scale relative to his soldiers and enemies. From the mid-twentieth century, appliqué workshops increasingly produced work for a tourist and export market alongside continuing court and funerary commissions.

=== Bocio and Vodun sculpture ===
Fon sculptors also produced bocio, empowered figures placed before shrines and royal palaces for spiritual protection, and staffs and vessels intended as conduits between the physical and spiritual worlds within Vodun practice. Vodun-related material culture, including altar sculpture and shrine painting, remains an active field of production in southern Benin, particularly in and around Ouidah, a historic centre of the religion.

== Yoruba (Nago) arts ==
The south-eastern regions of Benin, bordering Nigeria, are home to Yoruba-speaking communities (locally known as Nago) whose artistic traditions overlap with those of Yorubaland more broadly. The best-documented of these is Gelede, a masking and performance tradition believed to have originated in the Ketu region straddling the Benin-Nigeria border in the eighteenth century. Gelede masquerades, staged annually to honour the spiritual power of elderly women ("our mothers") and to secure fertility, health and prosperity, feature carved wooden helmet masks whose superstructures depict animals, human figures or scenes drawn from proverbs and community life, worn with elaborate cloth costumes and performed to drumming and song. The Gelede tradition, shared by Yoruba-Nago communities in Benin, Nigeria and Togo, was inscribed by UNESCO on the Representative List of the Intangible Cultural Heritage of Humanity in 2008.

== Afro-Brazilian heritage ==
From the nineteenth century, formerly enslaved Africans and their descendants who returned from Brazil, chiefly to Ouidah and Porto-Novo, brought with them a distinctive Afro-Brazilian architectural style combining European baroque ornament with local building practices and materials. Surviving villas, such as the Villa Ajavon in Ouidah (built 1922), are considered an important part of Benin's built cultural heritage; some have been restored as museums or cultural venues, though many others remain at risk due to complications of shared family ownership and lack of resources for conservation.

== Museums and heritage institutions ==
The Musée Historique d'Abomey (Historical Museum of Abomey), housed within the former palaces of kings Ghézo and Glèlè at the Royal Palaces of Abomey UNESCO site, holds royal thrones, ceremonial weapons, asen and other regalia alongside the palace bas-reliefs. In Porto-Novo, the Musée Ethnographique Alexandre Sènou Adandé preserves objects relating to Benin's diverse ethnic traditions.

Private philanthropy has also shaped the contemporary museum landscape: the Fondation Zinsou, established in Cotonou in 2005 by art historian Marie-Cécile Zinsou, opened a museum of contemporary art in 2013 in the restored Villa Ajavon in Ouidah, and maintains a second exhibition space ("Le Lab") in Cotonou; the Foundation states its aim as making African contemporary art accessible to a broad Beninese public free of charge.

Since the early 2020s, the Beninese government has pursued a programme of new museum construction, including the Musée de l'Épopée des Amazones et des Rois du Danxomè in Abomey, intended to permanently house the restituted royal treasures; a Musée d'Art Contemporain in Cotonou; an International Museum of Memory and Slavery in Ouidah; and an International Vodun Museum planned for Porto-Novo.

== Restitution of the Abomey treasures ==
Twenty-six royal objects looted from the Abomey palace in 1892 by French colonial forces under General Alfred Dodds during the Second Franco-Dahomean War (including anthropozoomorphic royal statues of kings Ghézo, Glèlè and Béhanzin, carved thrones, palace doors, asen and royal regalia) had been held in French museums, latterly the Musée du quai Branly–Jacques Chirac in Paris, for 129 years. Following a law passed unanimously by the French National Assembly in December 2020, the works were formally transferred to Benin on 9 November 2021 and arrived in Cotonou the following day. From February to May 2022 the objects were shown to the Beninese public for the first time in more than a century in the exhibition The Art of Benin of Yesterday and Today, from Restitution to Revelation at the Palais de la Marina presidential palace in Cotonou, drawing more than 220,000 visitors and shown alongside more than thirty contemporary Beninese artists. The restitution was widely described as the first large-scale return of looted African heritage by a former European colonial power. A related object, a royal three-legged stool (kataklè), was separately returned to Benin by Finland, having been held by the National Museum of Finland since 1939.

== Contemporary art ==
A distinct contemporary art movement developed in Benin from the late twentieth century, building on but also departing from court and religious traditions. Artists such as Cyprien Tokoudagba (1939–2012), a painter and sculptor from Abomey who restored the Vodun frescoes of the royal palaces before exhibiting internationally, and Calixte Dakpogan and Dominique Kouas, worked at the boundary between traditional craft and gallery-based contemporary art, opening the way for a younger generation of artists working across painting, sculpture, photography, installation and video.

Beninese artists who have achieved wide international recognition include Meschac Gaba (born 1961, Cotonou), a conceptual artist based between Rotterdam and Cotonou best known for The Museum of Contemporary African Art 1997–2002, a twelve-room installation acquired by Tate Modern; Romuald Hazoumè (born 1962, Porto-Novo), who works with recycled materials, notably discarded plastic petrol containers reworked into mask-like sculptures, alongside photography, film and large-scale installation; and Georges Adéagbo, known for large accumulative installations combining found objects, texts and images. A younger generation, including Moufouli Bello, Ishola Akpo, Chloé Quenum, Dominique Zinkpè, Emo de Medeiros, Julien Sinzogan, Gérard Quenum and Laeila Adjovi, has continued to expand the range of media and subject matter associated with Beninese art, frequently engaging with themes of gender, Vodun spirituality, colonial memory and restitution.

=== International exhibitions ===
Benin's contemporary art scene gained further international visibility through two rival contemporary art biennials staged simultaneously in Cotonou in late 2012 and early 2013, and, in 2024, by the country's debut national pavilion at the 60th Venice Biennale. Titled Everything Precious Is Fragile and curated by Nigerian curator Azu Nwagbogu, the Benin Pavilion presented work by Romuald Hazoumè, Chloé Quenum, Moufouli Bello and Ishola Akpo exploring African feminism, the Vodun religion, the memory of the Dahomey Amazons and the Atlantic slave trade, introducing the concept of "rematriation" as a feminist extension of restitution discourse.

== See also ==
- Culture of Benin
- Kingdom of Dahomey
- Vodun
- Gelede
- Royal Palaces of Abomey
- Romuald Hazoumè
- Cyprien Tokoudagba
