= Vodun art =

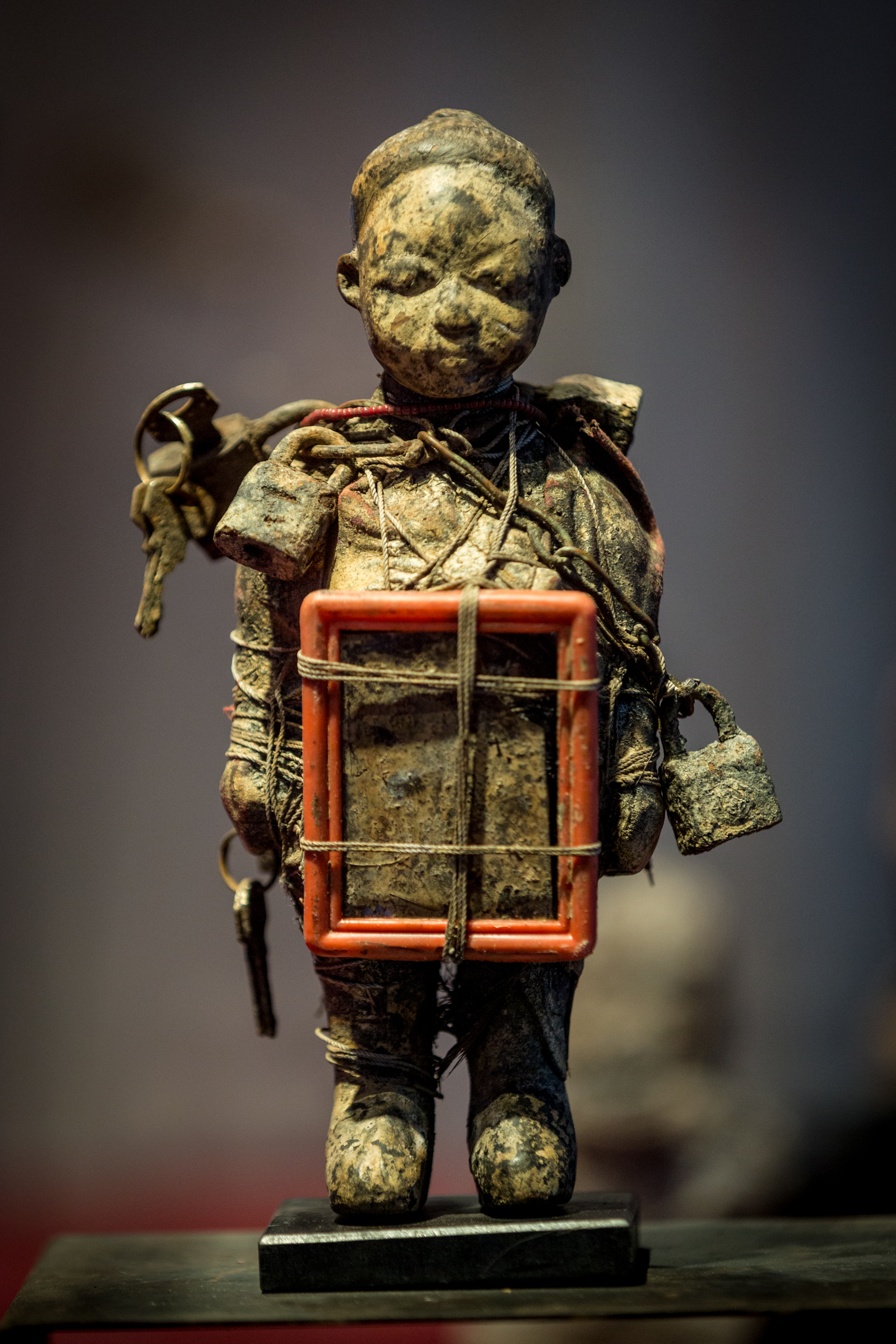
- Wutuji bocio. Ewé, Togo, 2nd half of 20th century
- Location: West Africa, Central Africa

Vodun art is associated with the West African Vodun religion of Nigeria, Benin, Togo and Ghana. The term is sometimes used more generally for art associated with related religions of West and Central Africa and of the African diaspora in Brazil, the Caribbean and the United States. Art forms include bocio, carved wooden statues that represent supernatural beings and may be activated through various ritual steps, and Asen, metal objects that attract spirits of the dead or other spirits and give them a temporary resting place. Vodun is assimilative, and has absorbed concepts and images from other parts of Africa, India, Europe and the Americas. Chromolithographs representing Indian deities have become identified with traditional Vodun deities and used as the basis for murals in Vodun temples. The Ouidah '92 festival, held in Benin in 1993, celebrated the removal of restrictions on Vodun in that country and began a revival of Vodun art.

== Background ==
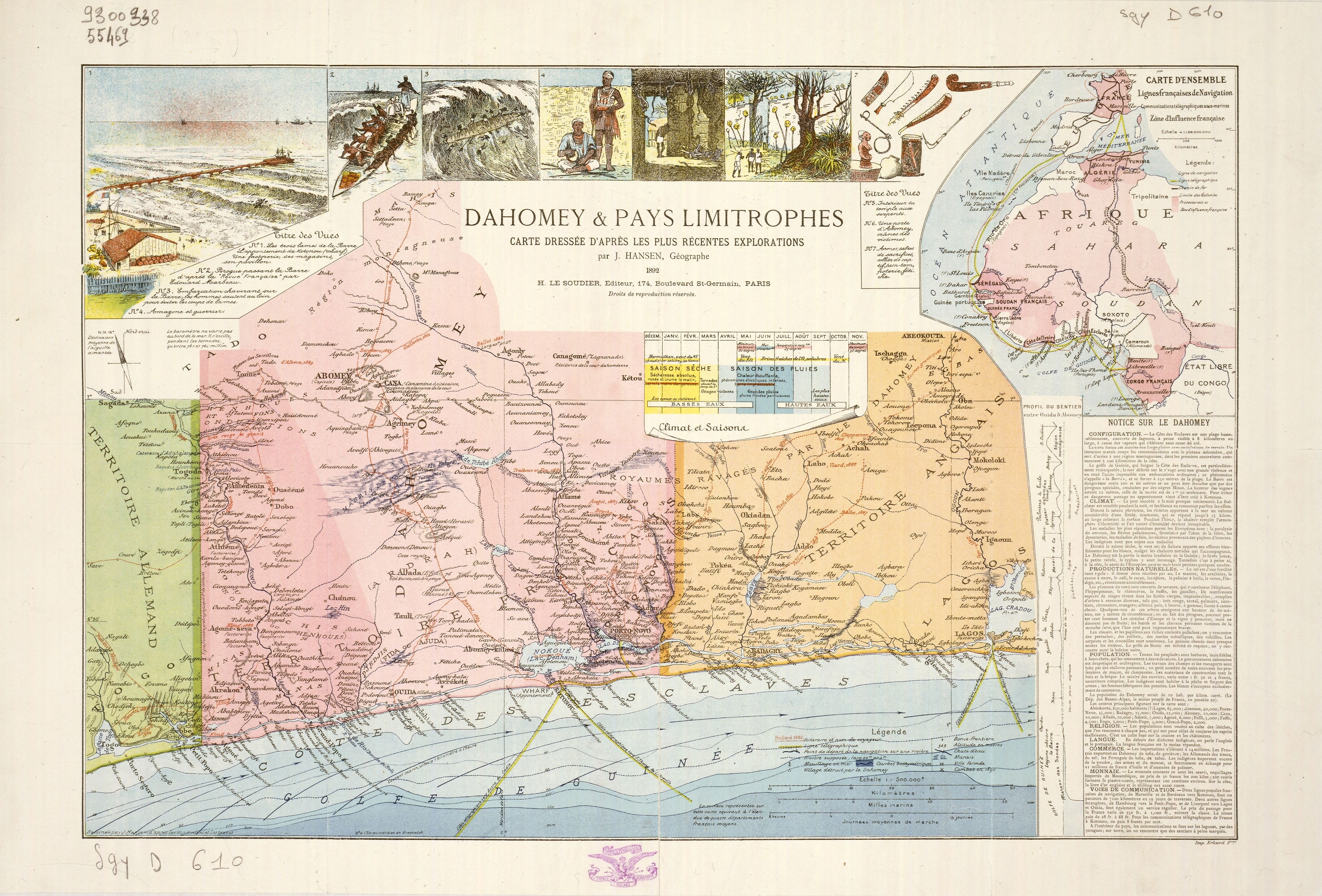
1892 map of the Côte des escalves (Slave Coast) showing Dahomey (French) between Togo (German) and Lagos (British)

The term "Vodun" covers a number of cults dedicated to different deities in the same pantheon, or to spirits, natural forces or ancestors, either disembodied or resident in fetishes. Each cult has specific rites, sacred objects, esoteric "deep knowledge", priestly hierarchies and initiation processes. In the precolonial period in Dahomey the system of cults was closely related to the ruling structure. "Vodun" is also used in a loose sense for religions of various societies from Dahomey, western Nigeria and southwestern Zaire. People from these countries were taken as slaves to Brazil and the Caribbean where they continue to practice religions derived from Vodun. The Haitian Vodou religion combines elements of the classical religions of Dahomey, Yorubaland and Kongo. (Note: The Vodun religion of Dahomey was influenced by the Yoruba religion, which already had similar concepts, when Dahomey conquered the Yoruba lands in the 17th century and assimilated elements of Yoruba culture.)

Various art historians have argued that Vodun is assimilative, taking foreign objects and interpreting them to meet indigenous needs. Modern Vodun arts continue to draw in symbolic and material elements from other parts of Africa, Europe, India and African America.

West African Vodun religious objects were at first viewed by outsiders simply as religious fetishes. Later they became valued as art objects, and then as symbols of the African diaspora. They have been interpreted as modern art and also as traditional art. It is said that Pablo Picasso was inspired by traditional West African sculpture when he made his proto-cubist painting Les Demoiselles d'Avignon. With the Ouidah '92 festival, Vodou art has become a symbol of national identity in Benin.

== Art forms ==
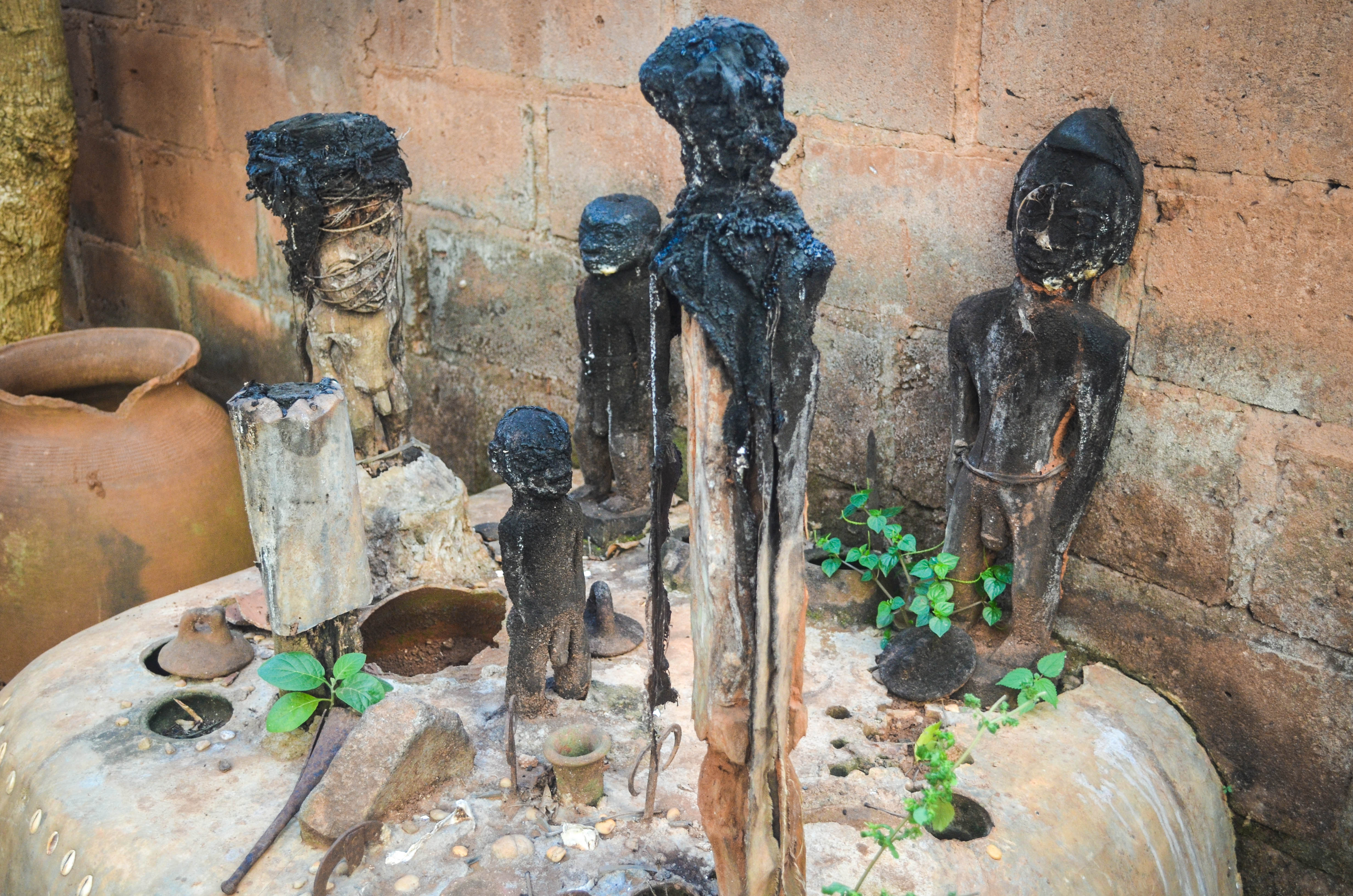
Bocheaw in Benin around Abomey 2013

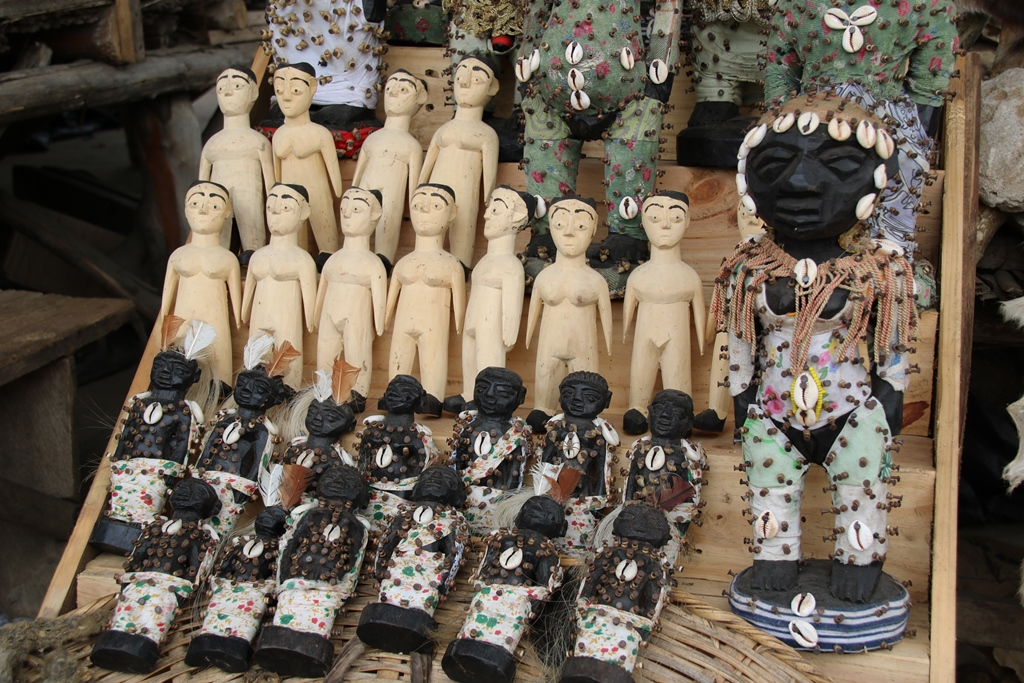
Dolls at Akodessawa Fetish Market, Lomé, Togo

=== Bochio ===
Suzanne Blier's African Vodun. Art, Psychology, and Power (Chicago, 1995) was the most complete English-language account of African vodun objects when it was published, based on a year of fieldwork in 1985-86 in Abomey, Benin and nearby towns. It discusses the religious artifacts of the Fon people and their neighbors in Benin and Togo, called bochio or bocheaw (empowered bodies) and the associated vodun beliefs and practices. Blier says the bocio are mainly "counter aesthetic", the opposite of what the Fon would consider pleasing or beautiful. They are designed to attract and hold powerful forces through which the owner can achieve goals such as controlling others, attaining well-being, harming enemies or protecting against destructive forces sent out by enemies.

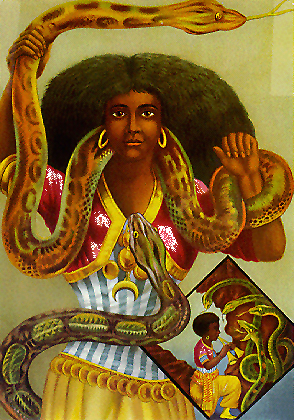
1880s Chromolithograph of a Samoan snake charmer, identified as Mami Wata

Typically the bochio are wood carvings enhanced with medicines that are packed inside them or attached in packets, and with paint and objects such as horns, beads or chains. Often they are bound, clothed or pegged to hold in the magical powers. The bochio objects are linked to gods, forest spirits or the dead, or to animals or plants that have properties associated with these beings. Bocheaw are activated or empowered by assemblage, speech, saliva, heat in the form of pepper and alcohol, knotting and offering to the higher power or deity. Some have pointed bases so they can be driven into the earth, the source of power for the trickster deity Legba. These can only be activated once. Others may have plinth bases and may be activated more than once.

=== Indian art ===
The coastal regions of what are now Benin and Togo have long been open to external ideas and images that have been absorbed into the local culture, and are reflected in the elastic structure of Vodun religion and art. In the late 1950s Indian chromolithographs started to be incorporated in Vodun art. In Vodun belief all Indian spirits come from the sea; "India" and the sea are the same concept. Chromolithographs representing Indian gods and printed in India, England or Nigeria have been widely distributed in West Africa since the 1950s. Much the most popular image is that of the snake charmer. This image, derived from a painting of a performer in a German circus, has been identified as an image of the local water spirit and seductress Mami Wata. Other images of other Indian gods have been identified with other local spirits.

In the 21st century the artist Joseph Kossivi Ahiator of Ghana has been much in demand as an India spirit temple painter in Benin, Togo and Ghana. When commissioned to paint a Vodun temple he refers to his collection of chromolithographs, to the images in his dreams and to the dreams and desires of the owner of the temple. Ahiator often visits India in his dreams, or on the beach, and Indian images are clearly recognizable in his temple murals. The temple of Gilbert Attissou, a prominent Vodun priest in Aného, Togo has bas-relief figures of Shiva and Lakshmi on either side of the doorway, and has an "India" shrine with walls decorated with Mami Wata, Lord Shiva, Lakshmi and other deities. The shrine is dedicated to Nana-Yo, one of the Vodun names for Shiva. Attissou was also drawn to the Indian gods and their power to control the sea from an early age, and used to spend many hours on the beach, where he made long visits to "India".

=== Asen ===
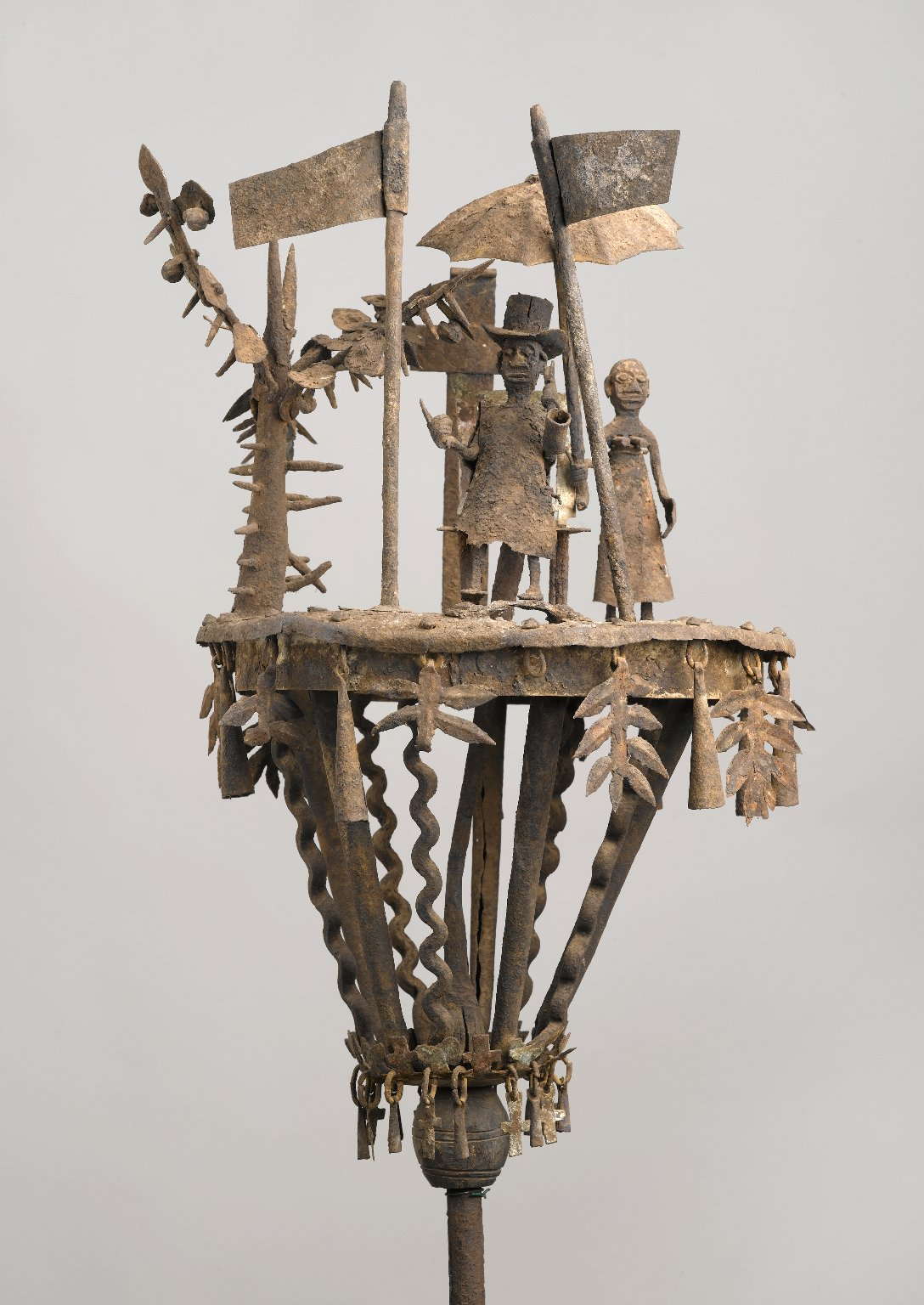
Asen altar attributed to the artist Akati Akpene Kendo

Asen is a general term for movable metal objects that attract the spirits of the dead and of the deities called vodun and temporarily hold them. They vary greatly in form and size. Ancestral asen, which honor the dead, are authentic ritual sculptures in the sense that they are made by African artists for religious purposes and not for the tourist trade. However, they seem to have first appeared only in the late precolonial period. At first they were adopted by the rulers of Dahomey from the Yoruba people, used as ancestral altars to enhance the prestige of the dynasty. After the French established colonial rule and abolished the monarchy, asen were adopted by all levels of society in Benin.

== Ouidah festival ==
The First International Festival of Vodun Arts and Cultures was held in Ouidah, Benin in February 1993, sponsored by UNESCO and the government of Benin. It celebrated the transatlantic Vodun religion, and was attended by priest and priestesses from Haiti, Cuba, Trinidad and Tobago, Brazil and the United States, as well as by government officials and tourists from Europe and the Americas. Some of the art commissioned for the festival is displayed at sites in the city, including work by the Benin artists Cyprien Tokoudagba, Calixte Dakpogan, Theodore Dakpogan, Simonet Biokou, Dominique Kouas, and Yves Apollinaire Pede, and work of the African Diaspora artists Edouard Duval-Carrié (Haiti), José Claudio (Brazil) and Manuel Mendive (Cuba).

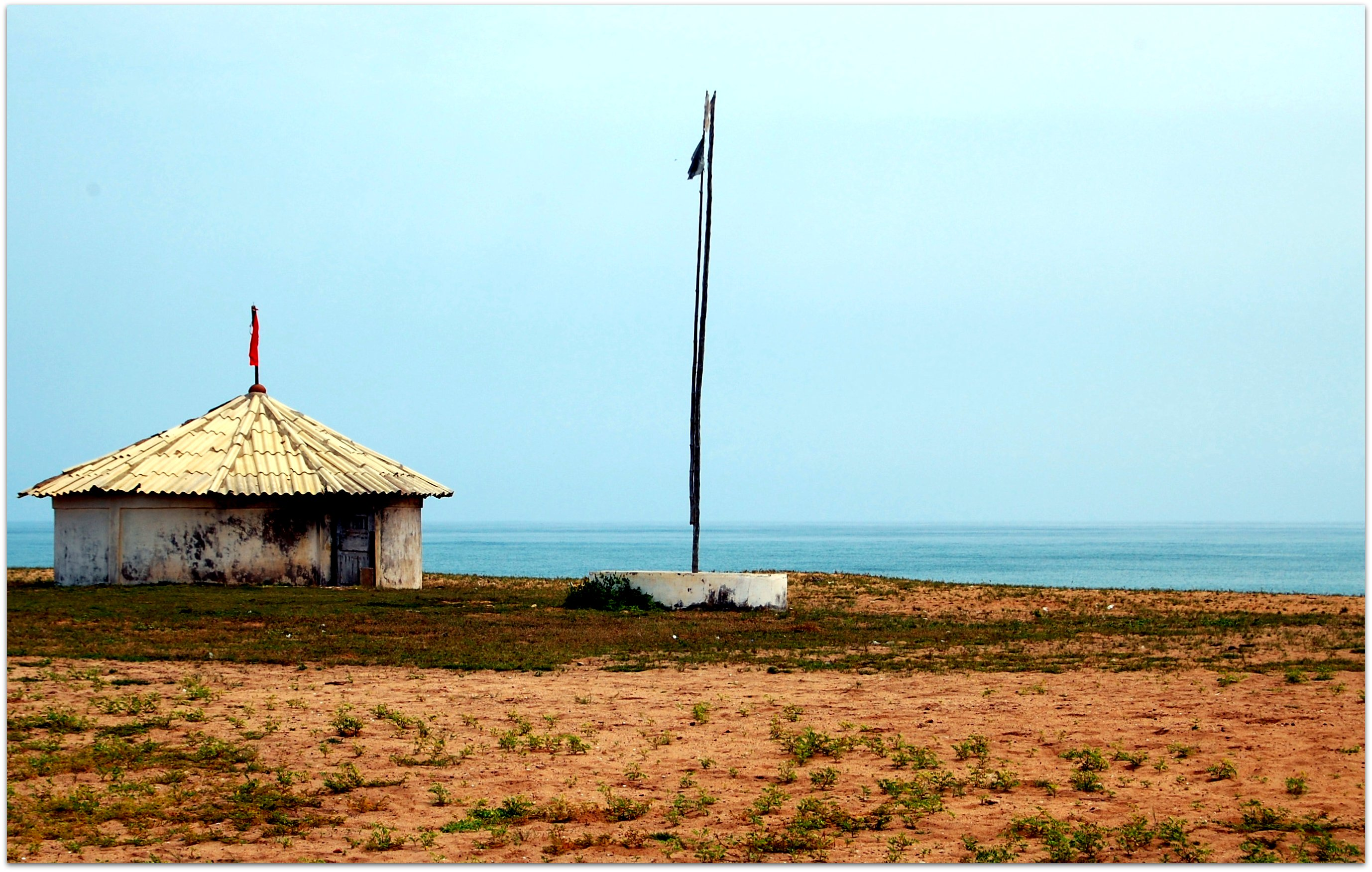
Vodun temple on the Slave Route near The Door of No Return, Ouidah on the Benin coast

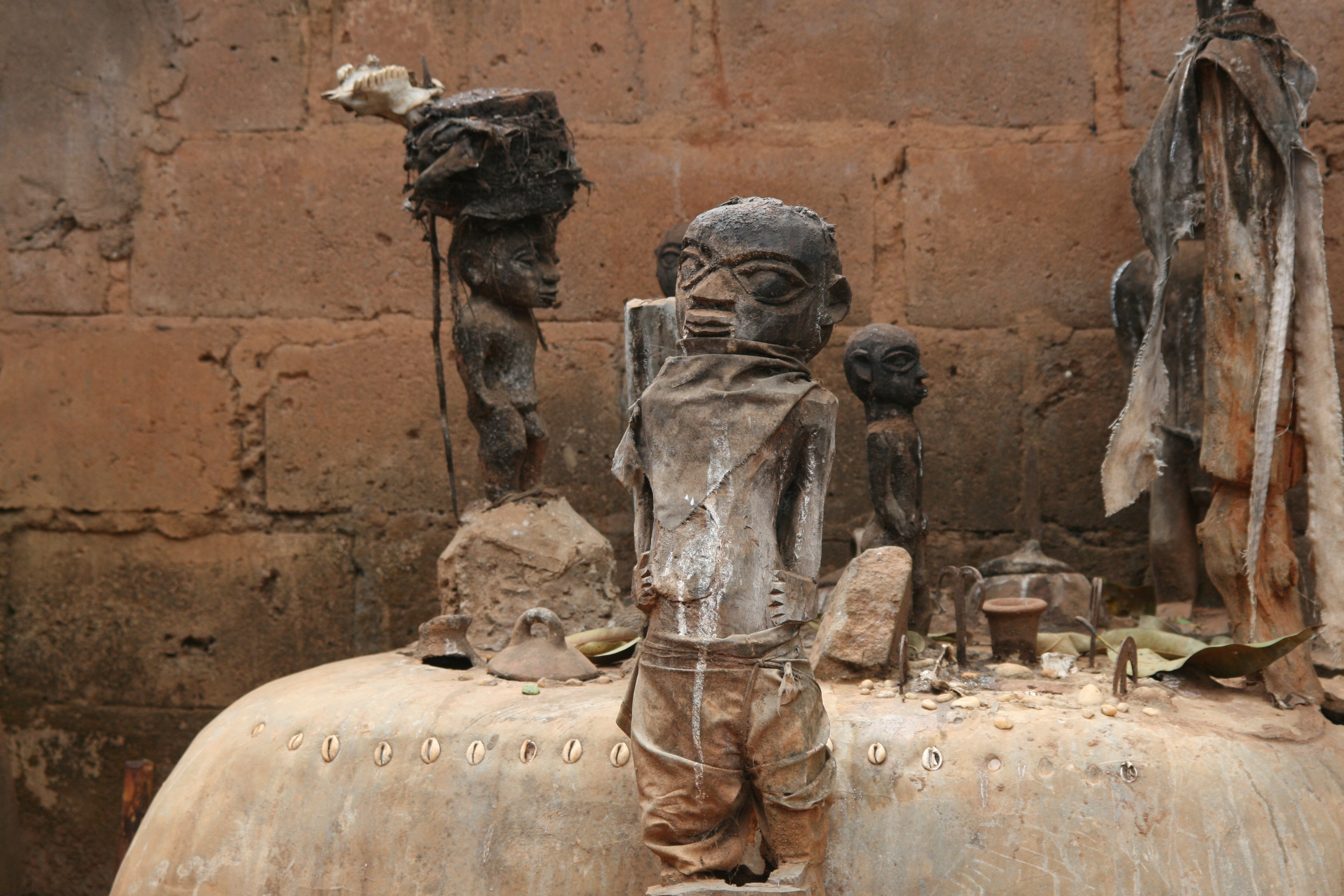
Altar and fetishes, Abomey, Benin

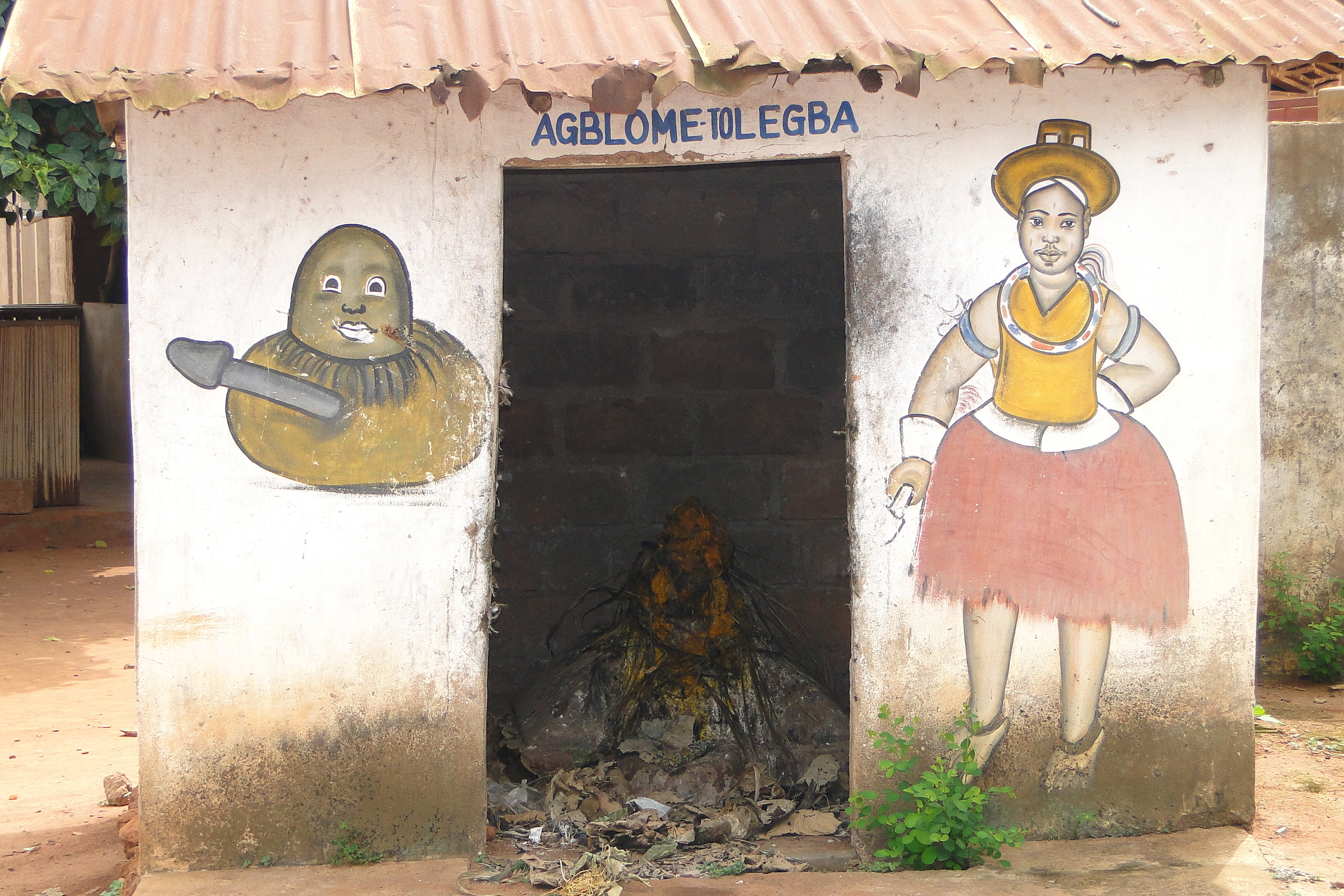
Vodun Shrine in Abomey, Benin

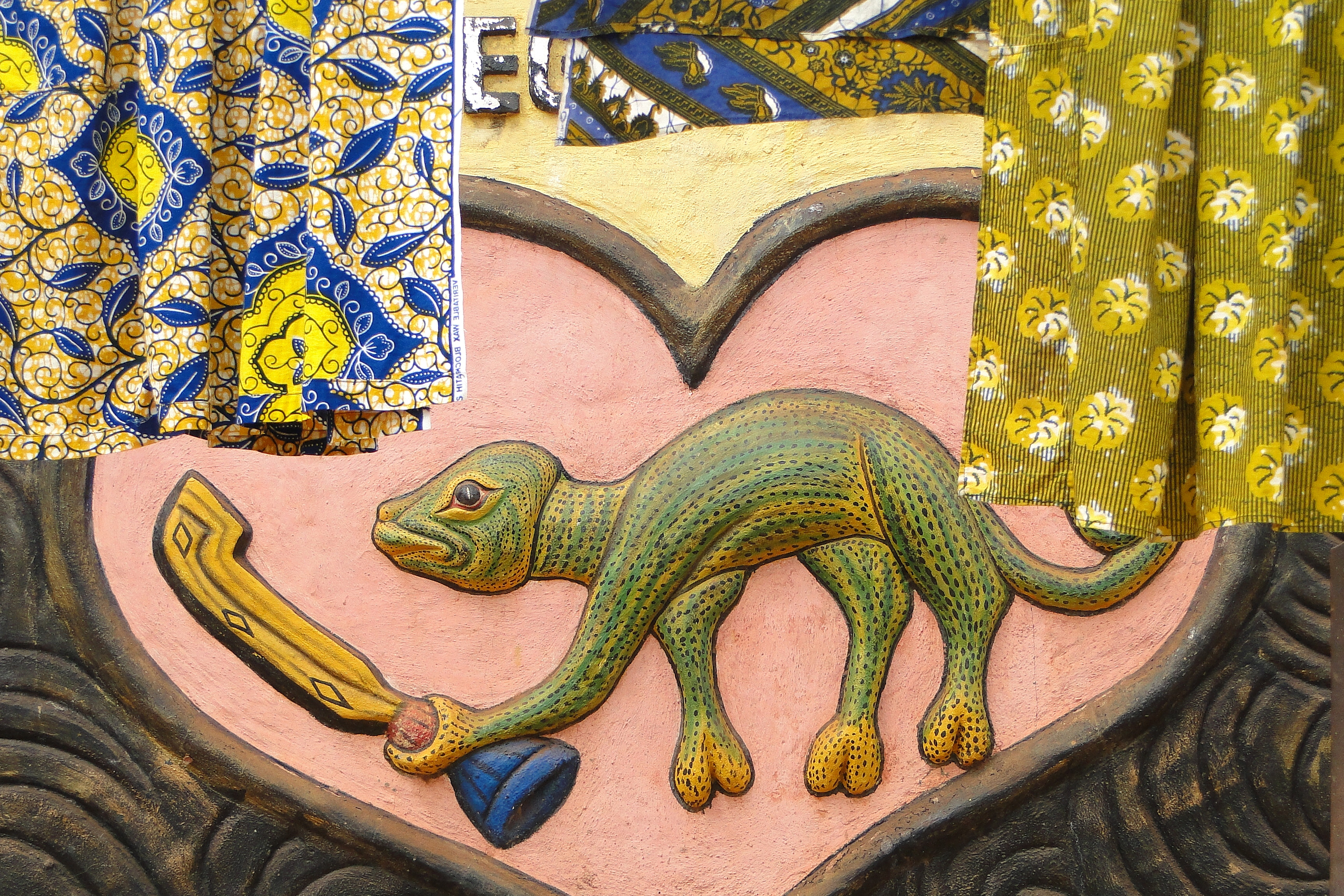
Animal Motif and Hanging Cloth on Vodun Shrine in Abomey, Benin

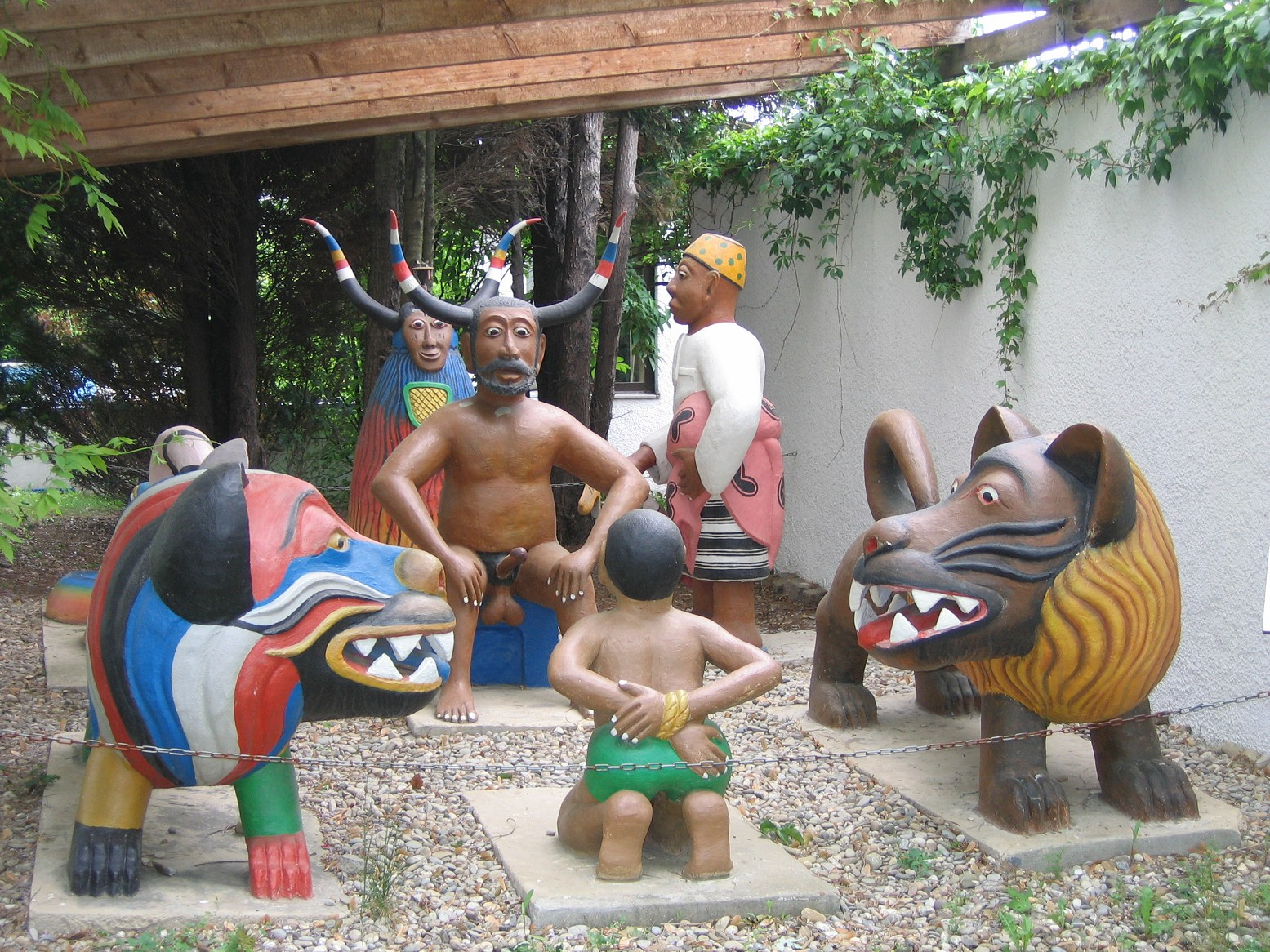
Cyprien Tokoudagba, Voodoo Pantheon (1989). Zangbeto (with horns, background) and Legba, sitting naked, judging a sinner.

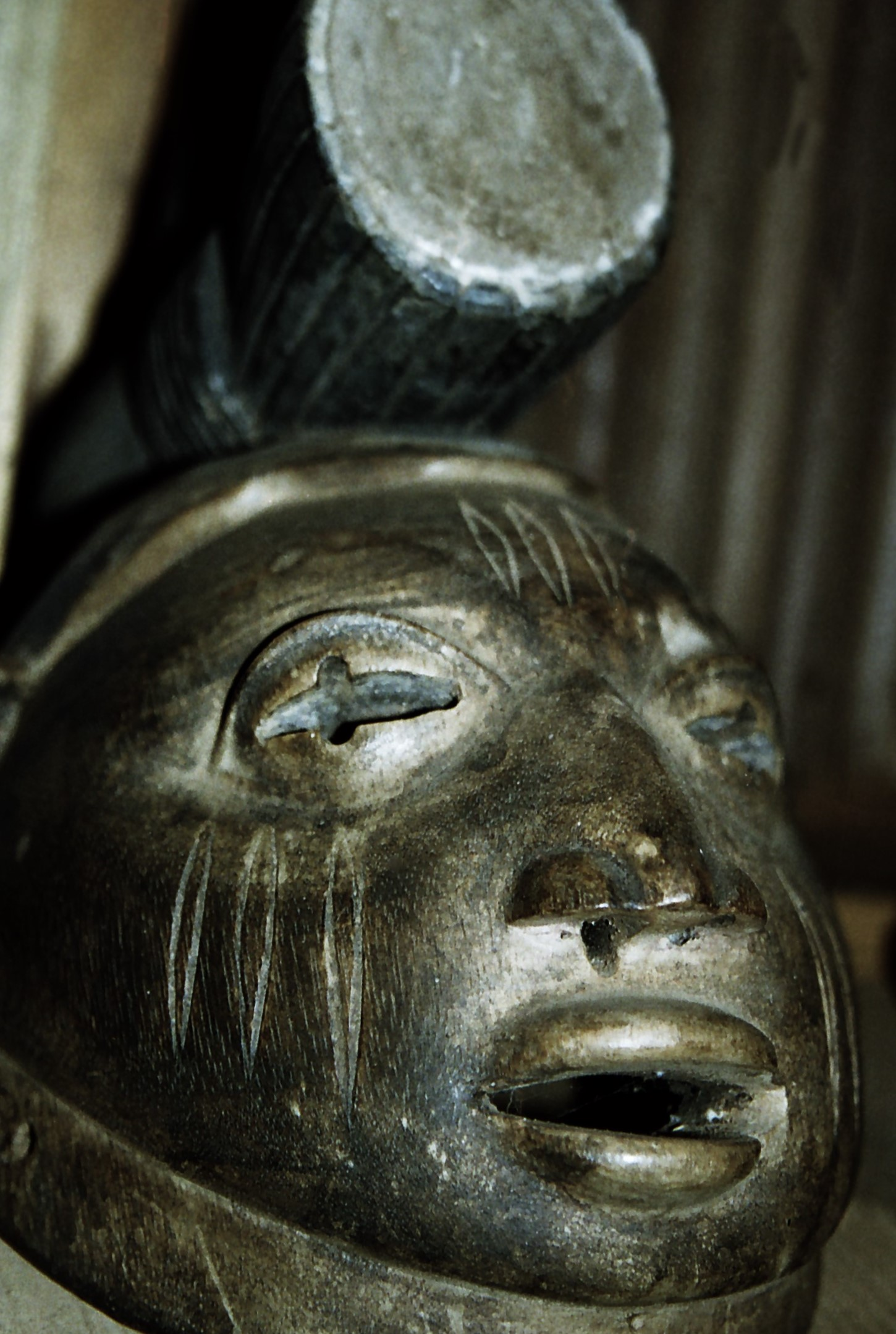
Vodun Statue, Benin

Zangbeto, Benin

== Sources ==
- Adogame, Afeosemime Unuose; Echtler, Magnus; Vierke, Ulf (2008). "The idea of 'India'". Unpacking the New: Critical Perspectives on Cultural Syncretization in Africa and Beyond. LIT Verlag Münster. ISBN 978-3-8258-0719-1.
- Bay, Edna G. (2008). Asen, Ancestors, and Vodun: Tracing Change in African Art. University of Illinois Press. ISBN 978-0-252-03255-4.
- Beidelman, T. O. (1996). "Review of Blier, Suzanne Preston: African Vodun. Art, Psychology, and Power". Anthropos. 91 (4./6). Anthropos Institute. JSTOR 40464518.
- Hackett, Rosalind I. J. (1998-10-01). Art and Religion in Africa. A&C Black. ISBN 978-0-304-70424-8.
- Hawley, John C. (2008-06-25). India in Africa, Africa in India: Indian Ocean Cosmopolitanisms. Indiana University Press. ISBN 978-0-253-00316-4.
- Kerchache, Jacques (2011). "Vodun Art". Fondation Cartier pour l'art contemporain.
- Norman, Neil L. (2014-10-03). "Sacred Vortices of the African Atlantic World". Materialities of Ritual in the Black Atlantic. Indiana University Press. ISBN 978-0-253-01391-0.
- Rahier, Jean Muteba; Hintzen, Percy C.; Smith, Felipe (2010). Global Circuits of Blackness: Interrogating the African Diaspora. University of Illinois Press. ISBN 978-0-252-07753-1.
- Rush, Dana (Winter 2001). "Contemporary Vodun Arts of Ouidah, Benin". African Arts. 34 (4). UCLA James S. Coleman African Studies Center: 32–96. doi:10.2307/3337805. JSTOR 3337805.
- Rush, Dana (2009). "Trans-suds, imaginaires de l'"Inde" dans l'art, la pratique et la pensée Vodun d'Afrique d l'ouest.". Afrique, la globalisation par les Suds. KARTHALA Editions. ISBN 978-2-8111-0199-2.
- Sutherland, Peter (2006). "Vodun Art and the Hyper-Visualization of Africa". Traditional Dwellings and Settlements Review. 18 (1). International Association for the Study of Traditional Environments (IASTE): 53–54. JSTOR 23565987.
- Thompson, Robert Farris (2010-05-26). Flash of the Spirit: African & Afro-American Art & Philosophy. Knopf Doubleday Publishing Group. ISBN 978-0-307-87433-7.
