= Agbo =

Agbo is a surname. Notable people with the surname include:

- Jerome Agbo
- Hans Agbo (born 1967), Cameroonian footballer
- Alex Agbo (born 1977), Nigerian footballer
- Fofo Agbo (born 1979), Ghanaian-born Hong Kong footballer
- Agoli-agbo (ruled 1894–1900), last King of Dahomey
- Berte-Evelyne Agbo, Beninese/Senegalese novelist
- Eddy Agbo, Nigerian molecular biologist

See also

- Agboville, town in Côte d'Ivoire
