= Divine Carcasse =

- Directed by: Dominique Loreau
- Produced by: Dominique Loreau
- Release date: 1998
- Running time: 60 minutes
- Countries: Benin; Belgium
- Languages: French; Fon; Yoruba with English subtitles

Divine Carcasse ('Divine Body') is a 1998 Beninese ethnofiction film directed by the Belgian filmmaker Dominique Loreau.

Mixing fiction and ethnography, the film follows a 1955 Peugeot: initially owned by Simon, an expatriate European philosophy lecturer, the car comes to be owned by Joseph, who uses it as a taxi until it is abandoned at a mechanic's workshop. There it is scavenged for parts used by the artist Simonet Biokou to create a sculpture of the ram god Agbo. The car is caught between commodity fetishism and post-colonial fetish spirituality:

Secondhand neocolonialism becomes first-class colonized semideity [...] As a car the Peugeot works fitfully; as a divinity it works superbly.
