= Pede =

Pede is a surname, and may refer to:

- Anni Pede-Erdkamp, known as Anni Pede (1940–2025), German long-distance runner
- Hendrik van Pede, architect of Oudenaarde Town Hall, Belgium, in 1526-1537
- Jean Pede (1927-2013), Belgian liberal politician
- Richard Pede, Dean of Hereford from 1463 to 1481
- Yves Apollinaire Pede (born 1959), Vodou artist from Benin

== See also ==
- Enzo Di Pede (born 1957), Italian soccer goalkeeper in the North American Soccer League and the original Major Indoor Soccer League
