= The Eagle's Nest (film) =

2019 Cameroonian film

- Directed by: Olivier Assoua
- Written by: Olivier Assoua; Magno Assoua Adeline
- Produced by: Magno Assoua Adeline; Sybile Aline Njoke; Olivier Assoua
- Starring: Claude S Mbida Nkou; Felicity Asseh
- Cinematography: Arsene Romuald Mvondo
- Edited by: Olivier Assoua
- Music by: Arthur & The Invicibles; Andy Payne
- Release date: 15 September 2020
- Running time: 91 minutes
- Countries: Cameroon; United Kingdom
- Language: French
- Budget: £5,000

The Eagle's Nest is a 2020 Cameroonian action thriller film directed by British-Cameroonian filmmaker Olivier Assoua and co-produced by director himself with Magno Assoua Adeline and Sybile Aline Njoke. The film stars Claude S Mbida Nkou and Felicity Asseh in lead roles, whereas Axel Abessolo, Richard Essame made supportive roles. The film revolves around two sex workers who start to change their destiny by moving to another country. The music was co-composed by Arthur & The Invicibles and Andy Payne.

The film Known in French as La Vallèe Des Aigles was screened at many international film festivals such as: Austin Film Festival 2020, Raindance Film Festival 2020 Montreal International Black Film Festival 2020 and Hollywood International Diversity Film Festival 2021. The film received positive acclaim from critics and won several awards.

== Cast ==
- Claude S Mbida Nkou as Paris Ewane
- Felicity Asseh as Samantha Penne
- Axel Abessolo as Otam
- Richard Essame as Jean-Pierre Obama

== Writers ==
- Olivier Assoua
- Magno Assoua Adeline

== Awards and accolades ==
- Jury Award: Best African Film - Toronto International Nollywood Film Festival (TINFF) 2021 - won
- Best Director at the Hollywood International Diversity Film Festival 2021 - won
- Best Actress at the Hollywood International Diversity Film Festival 2021 - won
- Best First Time Director at the Silk Road Film Awards Cannes. October, 2020 - won
- Finalist: Wales International Film Festival 2020
- Semi-finalist: Cannes International Independent Film Festival - CIIFF 2020
- Dark Maters category at Austin Film Festival 2020 - nominated
- Best cinematography at Raindance Film Festival 2020 - nominated
- Best film by an African living abroad at the African Movie Academy Awards (AMAA) 2020 - nominated
- Best Lead Actress in a Foreign Language Film at the 9th Nice International Film Festival 2021 - won
