= Bénirail =

Bénirail is the concessioned railway system of Benin. It is being rehabilitated by the Bolloré Group.

The project includes complete replacement of the track and the rehabilitation of the stations at Cadjèhoun Saint-Jean, Godomey, Cococodji and Pahou.

A passenger service to be called Blueline using second-hand coaches from Switzerland's Zentralbahn is due to start in late 2015. Bénirail will purchase BB204 diesel locomotives and Nippon Sharyo coaches from Indonesia.

== Suburban ==
- Cotonou - economic capital
- Cadjehoun
- Saint-Jean
- Godomey
- Cococodji
- Pahou
- Sémé

Stage 2

- Sémé
- Porto Novo - capital

== Country ==
- Cotonou
- Parakou (000 km)
- Niamey, Niger (574 km)

== International ==
A metre gauge network of 2500 km is proposed to link the following countries:

- Ivory Coast
- Burkina Faso
- Niger
- Benin
- Togo

== See also ==
- Railway stations in Benin
- Suburban railways in Africa
