= Paris in Motion (photography) =

- Artist: Mayeul Akpovi
- Year: 2012
- Type: Time-lapse, Stopmotion, Hyperlapse
- Subject: Paris

Paris in Motion is a photographic project about the city of Paris. It contains a series of three videos made only of photographs (more than 30,000 photos).

== Parts ==
Paris in Motion is in 3 parts (Videos featured on Vimeo and YouTube).

- 2012: Paris in Motion (Part I) – 3000 photographs selected
- 2012: Paris in Motion (Part II) – 3500 photographs selected
- 2013: Paris in Motion (Part III) – 5500 photographs selected
- 2014: Paris in Motion (part IV)
- 2014: Paris in Motion (part V)
