= Pahou =

- Arrondissement and town
- Location in Benin
- Coordinates: 6°23′N 2°13′E
- Country: Benin
- Department: Atlantique Department
- Commune: Ouidah

Population (2002)
  - Total: 14,436
- Time zone: UTC+1 (WAT)

Pahou is a town and arrondissement in the Atlantique Department of southern Benin. It is an administrative division under the jurisdiction of the commune of Ouidah. According to the population census conducted by the Institut National de la Statistique Benin on February 15, 2002, the arrondissement had a total population of 14,436.

== Transport ==
In 2015 a suburban passenger railway line, call Blueline is being developed by Bénirail of the Bolloré Group.

The project includes complete replacement of the track and the rehabilitation of the stations at Cadjèhoun Saint-Jean, Godomey, Cococodji and Pahou.

== Notable people ==
- Calixte Dakpogan (1958-), sculptor
