= Soraya Milla =

French filmmaker (b. 1989)

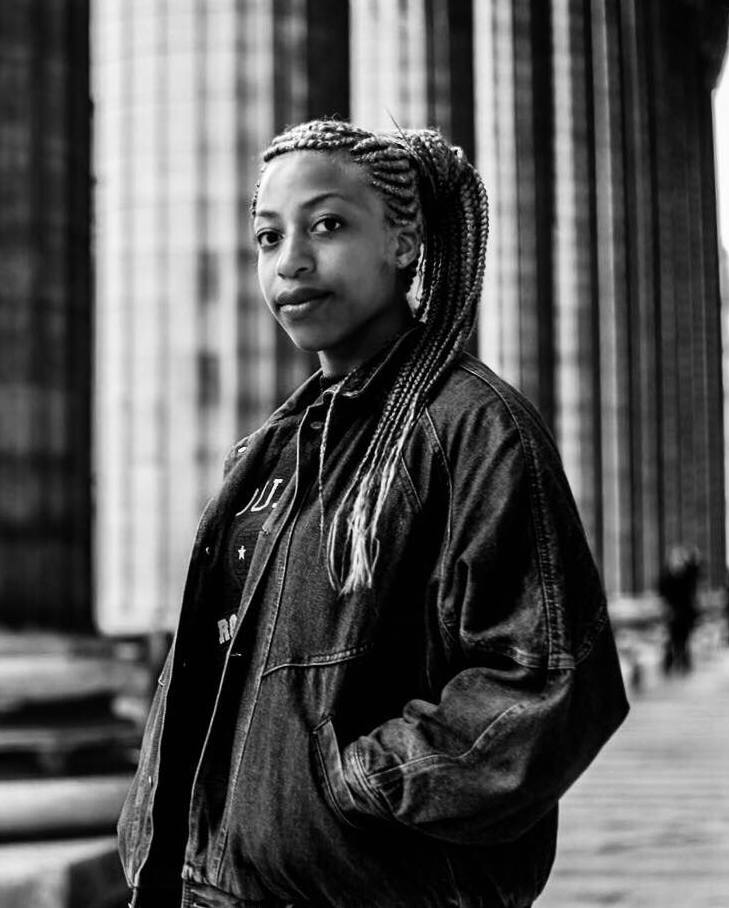
- Soraya Milla in 2022
- Born: March 8, 1989 (age 36); Paris, France
- Occupation(s): Filmmaker, screenwriter, film director, film producer
- Website: www.sorayamilla.com

Soraya Milla (born 1989), is a French independent filmmaker, film director and film producer. She is of Cameroonian–Beninese descent, and her work often is focused on Black identity and issues of dual culture.

She directed two short films Exotique (2015), about Black hair; and Vitiligo (2018), about Black skin. Milla's web series Afropolitaine (2020), was co-written with her mother Aline Angelo Milla; and portrays the daily life of a French family from Africa. Season 2 of Afropolitaine produced by TV5 Monde won the prize for best short format series at the Luchon Film Festival (2023), as well as the prize for best female actresses for Manda Touré and Tracy Gotoas.
