= Joseph Agbodjelou =

Beninese photographer (1912–c. 1999)

- Born: Joseph Moïse Agbodjélou; 1912; Vedo, French Dahomey (now Benin)
- Died: 1999, or 2000; Porto-Novo, Benin
- Other names: Joseph Agbojelou
- Occupation: Photographer
- Children: Leonce Raphael Agbodjelou

Joseph Moïse Agbodjélou (1912 – 1999, or 2000) was a Beninese photographer. His son is photographer Leonce Raphael Agbodjelou.

== Life and career ==
Joseph Moïse Agbodjélou was born in 1912, in French Dahomey (now Benin). While serving in the French Army in 1935, Agbodjelou took an interest in photography.

He later worked as a sales representative for Kodak film company in the Republic of Dahomey (now Benin). In the 1950s, they were approx. 10 photographers in the country. Agbodjelou was president of the Professional Photographers Association of Republic of Dahomey.
