= Eddy Agbo =

Nigerian molecular biologist

Eddy Chukwura Agbo is a Nigerian molecular biologist. He is the founder and CEO of Fyodor Biotechnologies. He now is an American citizen.

== Early life and education ==
Agbo grew up in Mbu. Mbu is a small village in the southeast of Nigeria. He studied Veterinary Medicine at the University of Ibadan, Nigeria. He graduated as Doctor of Veterinary Medicine. He holds a Master of Science in Biotechnology from Wageningen University and a PhD in Molecular Genetics from Utrecht University in the Netherlands. He also has a Graduate Certificate in ‘Leadership and Management in the Life Sciences’ from Johns Hopkins University Business School, USA.

== Career ==
Agbo held university positions at Utrecht University, Wageningen University and Vrije Universiteit Amsterdam, Netherlands. He did biomedical research for many years. Agbo moved to the USA to work for the Johns Hopkins University. He was a Research Fellow at Johns Hopkins University School of Medicine. He left Johns Hopkins to work for Cangen Biotechnologies. Cangen is a cancer therapeutics and diagnostics firm in Baltimore. There he was Senior Director for Research and Preclinical Development and Chief Technical Lead.

In 2008 he founded Fyodor.

== Awards ==
In 2012 Fyodor won a minority-owned business achievement award from the Greater Baltimore Committee.

In June 2016 Fyodor won the Innovation Prize for Africa in the category Special Prize for Social Impact. The $25,000 prize was awarded by the Africa Innovation Foundation. Fyodor won for its Urine Malaria Test. The test can diagnose malaria in 25 minutes.
