= Leonce Raphael Agbodjelou =

Beninese photographer (born 1965)

- Born: 1965 (age 60–61); Porto-Novo, Benin
- Occupations: Photographer, teacher, school founder
- Known for: photography
- Movement: contemporary art
- Father: Joseph Agbodjelou

Léonce Raphaël Agbodjélou (born 1965), is a Beninese photographer and teacher.

== Biography ==
Leonce Raphael Agbodjelou was born in Porto-Novo in 1965. He is the son of Benin photographer Joseph Agbodjelou (1912–1999). He was trained by his father. They traveled together with a portable studio. They used traditional colorful fabrics as background for the people portraits they made. Leonce Agbodjelou founded the first Photography School in Benin. He serves as the President of the Photographer's Association of Porto-Novo.

== Work ==
Agbodjelou's portraiture series, Citizens of Porto-Novo depicts people of Benin's capital. He is using a daylight studio and a medium format film camera for the project. His 'Musclemen' shows staged studio photograph of muscular men, which is popular theme in the West Africa. The 'Egungun' project are photographs of the masqueraders, depicting divine ancestors of Yoruba-speaking people. They usually appear at funerals to guide deceased to the spirit world. They can also appear at any time to protect people from misfortunes.

== Exhibitions ==
=== Solo exhibitions ===
- 2011 Egungun Project. A Sumptuous Masquerade, Jack Bell Gallery, London
- 2015 Egungun Masquerades, SMAC Gallery, Cape Town, South Africa
- 2017 The Egungun Project: One man show, Kleinschmidt Fine Photographs, Wiesbaden

=== Group exhibitions ===
- 2013 Native Nostalgia, Museum of African Design, Johannesburg
- 2013 Taylor Wessing Photographic Portrait Prize 2013, National Portrait Gallery, London
- 2015 Staring Back: The Creation and Legacy of Picasso's Demoiselles d'Avignon, Fleming Museum of Art
- 2015 Disguise: Masks and Global African Art, Seattle Art Museum
- 2016 Disguise: Masks and Global African Art, Brooklyn Museum
- 2017 Regarding Africa, Tel Aviv Museum of Art
- 2017 African-Print Fashion Now!, Fowler Museum at UCLA
- 2020 Through an African Lens: Sub-Saharan Photography from the Museum's Collection, The Museum of Fine Arts, Houston, Houston, Texas

== Collections ==
Leonce Raphael Agbodjelou works are in public collections around the world, including Zurich Museum of Art, Pitt Rivers Museum in Oxford, Saatchi Collection in London, Carnegie Museum of Art, Zeitz Museum of Contemporary Art Africa in Cape Town and Museum of Modern Art in Equatorial Guinea.
