= Mayeul Akpovi =

Beninese photographer

- Born: Benin
- Occupation: Photographer

Mayeul Akpovi is a Beninese photographer. He specializes on time-lapse photography techniques.

== Biography ==
Mayeul spent part of his career (as a developer) in France including Paris and Besançon. He became passionate about photography since late 2011 in Besançon, France.

His photographic work is focused on the capture of time and space as accelerated video called time-lapse or stop-motion time-lapse hyperlapse. Akpovi is known for his tribute videos to the city of Paris. In July 2013, he performed the first hyperlapse video dedicated to an African city.

== Photography ==
- 2012: Besançon in Motion
- 2012: Paris in Motion, (Part I), (Part II), (Part III) and (Part IV) – videos on Vimeo and YouTube
- 2013: Cotonou in Motion, first experience in Africa

== See also ==
- List of photographers
