= Manuel Mendive =

Afro-Cuban artist

Manuel Mendive Hoyos
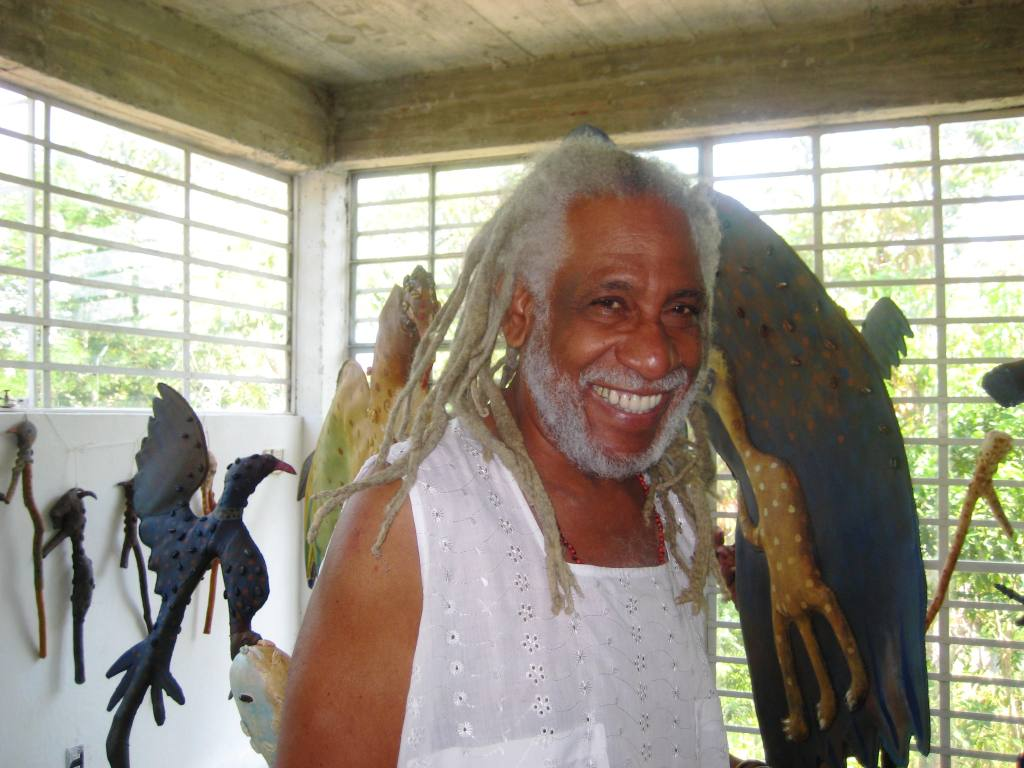
- Mendive in 2008
- Born: December 15, 1944 (age 81); Havana, Cuba
- Education: San Alejandro Academy of Fine Arts
- Alma mater: San Alejandro Academy of Fine Arts
- Known for: Painting, drawing, sculpture, performance art, body painting
- Notable work: Oya (1967); Viento a Fete (1984); Voodoo Altar; Slave Ship (1976)
- Style: Afro-Cuban art
- Awards: Adam Montparnasse Prize (1968); Alejo Carpentier Medal (1988); Chevalier des Arts et Lettres (1994)

Manuel Mendive Hoyos (born 15 December 1944) is an Afro-Cuban artist. Mendive was born in Havana, Cuba, in 1944. His family practiced La Regla de Ocha, or Santería. A mulatto, he cherishes his Yoruba roots from the West coast of Africa. Today, his art resides in museums and galleries all over the world which include Cuba, Russia, Somalia, Benin, Congo, Norway, Denmark, Finland, Jamaica, and the United States.

== Early life and education ==
Mendive was born in Havana, Cuba, in 1944. His family practiced La Regla de Ocha, or Santería. A mulatto, he cherishes his Yoruba roots from the West coast of Africa. In 1956, he graduated from the San Alejandro Academy of Visual Arts, Havana.

== Career ==
Since the beginning of his artistic career, he has participated in many group and solo art exhibits. His first one-man show was held at the Center of Art in Havana, in 1964. In 1968, he was awarded with the Adam Montparnasse prize for his painting exhibit at the Salon de Mai, in Paris, and third prize at the Salón Nacional de Artes Plásticas, in Havana.

In 1982, Mendive made his first trip to West Africa and traveled throughout the region for a year gaining new insight into his Yoruba roots. He drew energy from spending time in Africa and became inspired on a whole new level. After his return to Cuba, his art portrayed images connected with the natural environment, such as, his 1984 painting "Viento a Fete".

Additional noteworthy awards Mendive has received include the Alejo Carpentier Medal from the Consejo de Estado of the Republic of Cuba, in 1988, and the Chevalier des Arts et Lettres from the Minister of Culture and Francophony of the French Republic, in 1994.

Mendive's work was exhibited at the "Ouidah '92" festival, which celebrated Vodun art from Benin and the African Diaspora in Ouidah, Benin in February 1993.

In 2014, Mendive exhibited at the N'Namdi Center for Contemporary Art in Detroit.

He has received numerous awards for his art within exhibitions in Cuba and in Europe.

== Artistic style and themes ==
Mendive's work incorporates several art mediums and genres. His art consists of drawing, painting, body painting, wood carving, sculpture, and performance that integrates loosely choreographed dance with rhythmic music. At times, the availability of art materials was rather scarce due to the harsh economic climate of the island. As a result, he relied on his creativity and resourcefulness to obtain various mediums, commonly found in nature. Much of his work consists of paint and wood, which he combines with other interesting elements, such as, human hair, sand, feathers, and glass that convey a primitive quality. He not only paints with oils and pastels on canvases, but he paints on masks and posters. Mendive is also famous for his representation of saints and Lukumi gods through his use of carved, burned, and painted wood that he made during the 1960s.

Mendive's art is strongly influenced by the Santería religion. In fact, Santería permeates every form of his art from body painting to events performed in public spaces. In the 1960s and 1970s, his most significant works were created, and they depict a primitive display of Yoruba mythology with his use of raw materials that resemble altars. A prime example that his style is primitive and mythological is reflected in his art piece "Voodoo Altar" displayed at the Museo Nacional de Guanabacoa, in Cuba. Some of the materials Mendive's used to create "Voodoo Altar" include twigs, feathers, and hair. According to the Cuban art critique Gerardo Mosquera, his art does not contain ceremonial function, but possesses a sense of 'living mythological thought' and utilizes Afro-Cuban imagery to study the questions of contemporary life.

His mythological and religious themes are evident in his 1967 painting "Oya", which is the Yoruba goddess of storms. Oya is associated with the passage from life into death and Mendive had a fascination with death during his 'dark period' in the late 1960s. An example of his primitive, Afro-Cuban imagery is seen in his 1976 painted wood carving, "Slave Ship", which epitomizes the onset of the struggles in modern-day life. His art is minimalistic, yet it is thought provoking. In the 1970s, he continued to promote Afro-Cuban culture through his colorful art by referencing the Middle Passage, colonialism, Cuban history, and Yoruba history.

His art is a mixture of African and European styles. He uses this culmination of African and European techniques and traditions to showcase his Afro-Cuban style to the Western world. Mendive displays a narration in much of his art and performances. This is evident in his 1968 painting of Che Guevara, which offers a visual narrative to the Western world about Che Guevara's positive influence in Cuba. Gerardo Mosquera meditatively remarks on Mendive's art, "the black person tends to be integrated with few contradictions into a new entity: the Cuban nation." Mendive is successful at producing art that combines Afro-Cuban culture with international themes to make an ideological statement about social issues in Cuba. In addition, his art illustrates the influences that came from Africa and Europe in Cuba.

From the mid-1960s to 2010, much of his work includes paintings and drawings that portray spirits and Orisha saints through the use of a wide array of colors and smooth, flowing shapes. The primary theme in his art is his recognition that African religion and African culture have shaped Cuban national identity and culture. Gerardo Mosquera praises him for his art because Mendive acknowledges the rich tapestry of African contributions to the Cuban culture.

An example of his belief that African religion and culture are linked with the natural world is captured through his 1997 painting "Olofi, the Spirits, Man and Nature". In addition, his performances exemplify his heightened passion of the African culture. His interest in the culture was made apparent in his 1986 performance "La vida", in which he painted the bodies and faces of the dancers with flowing lines that symbolize spirits.
