= Edouard Duval-Carrié =

Haitian-American painter (born 1954)

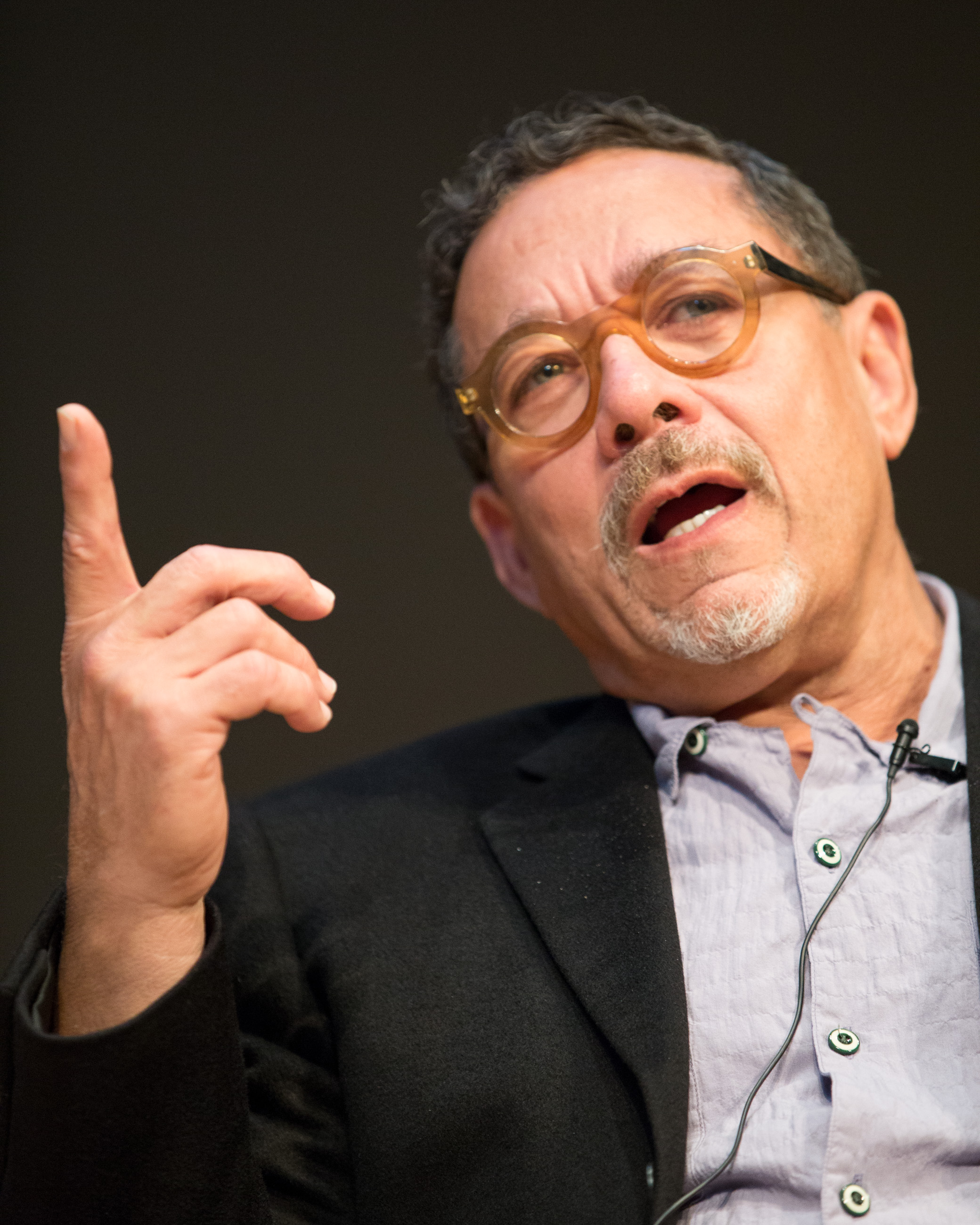
- Edouard Duval-Carrié in 2014
- Born: 1954 (age 71–72); Port-au-Prince, Haiti
- Known for: Painting, Sculpting
- Website: Official website

Edouard Duval-Carrié (born 1954) is a Haitian-born American contemporary painter and sculptor based in Miami, Florida.

== Life ==
Edouard Duval-Carrié was born in Pétion-Ville. His family emigrated to Puerto Rico during the François Duvalier regime, while he was a child. Duval-Carrié studied at the Université de Montréal and McGill University in Canada before graduating with a Bachelor of Arts from Loyola College, Montréal in 1978. He later attended the École Nationale Supérieure des Beaux-Arts in Paris, France, from 1988 to 1989. He resided in France for many years and currently lives in Miami, Florida. "I didn't want to go back to Haiti because of the political turmoil there. I have two kids," he explains. Instead, he resides among Miami's substantial Haitian immigrant population and maintains cultural ties to his homeland. His works have been exhibited in Europe and the Americas.

== Work ==
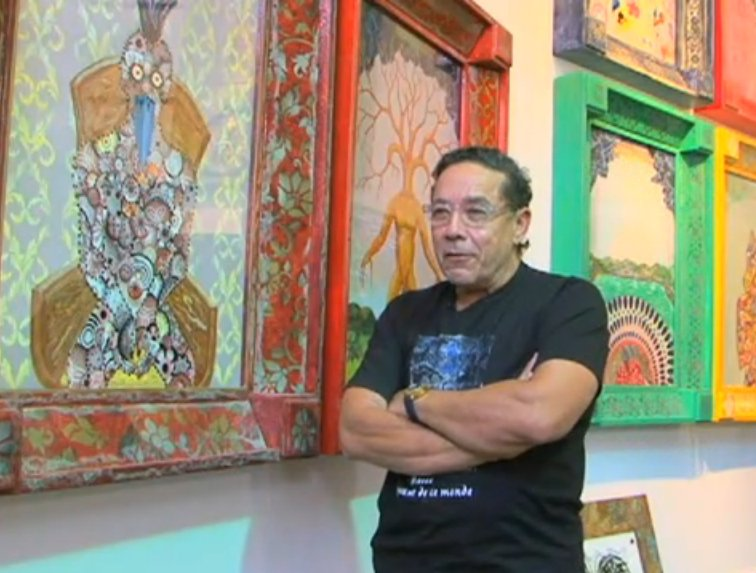
Duval-Carrié in his studio.

Duval-Carrié's art reflects the culture and history of Haiti with references to the Vodou religion. His work is often overtly political, executed in attempts to embody his nation's spirit and its troubles with an attitude that is neither detached nor ironic. His 1979 work J.C. Duvalier en Folle de Marié (Jean-Claude Duvalier as Mad Bride) is a criticism of the country's controversial leader. Later in Mardigras at Fort Dimanche Duval-Carrié juxtaposes Duvalier against a torture chamber, an army general, and other symbols of the repressive regime. New York University classified his output as magical realism for an event to accompany the book launch of Continental Shifts: The Art of Edouard Duval-Carrié, which was published by the university's press. He operates in a variety of media: altarpieces, lacquered tiles, and reliquaries in addition to painting and sculpture. Installations have become more prevalent in his recent output.

As Duval-Carrié explained his artistic motivations for a Miami art gallery:

I have tried to analyze the historical context of the genesis of that partial island nation [Haiti], looked at the strife and suffering that brought the then society of slaves and slave masters to the point of ebullition. I look closely at the savagery on both parts of the struggle, understanding and giving my total sympathy to the downtrodden, not realizing that patterns are easily learned and extremely resilient to alteration... I have scrutinized the successive generations of pathetic leaders and their sordid entourages... But that is politics and an artist should be well cautioned to keep at bay that kind of poetry, which should be resumed as that of futility. So a step further or a level deeper was reached when the fabulous world of spirits, old and new, true and false, real and imagined, made themselves felt at different planes of consciousness. They come under many names, all quite entrancing. “Loas”, “Espirits”, or “Mysteres” all conveying a sense of foreboding inspiring the nebulousness from whence they come.

Duval-Carrié's work was exhibited at the "Ouidah '92" festival, which celebrated Vodun art from Benin and the African Diaspora in Ouidah, Benin in February 1993. Duval-Carrié received a South Florida Cultural Consortium Visual Art Fellowship in 1995 and a Southern Arts Federation Visual Art Fellowship in 1996.

His work has been shown in solo exhibitions in Haiti, the Dominican Republic, Colombia, France, Mexico, and in several states of the United States. Two of the artist's works are displayed as public commissions in Miami: a 1996 piece for the Jefferson Reaves Rehabilitative and Health Center and The Lady of Miami at One Miami Riverwalk.

In 2014, the Pérez Art Museum Miami presented Imagined Landscapes, a career survey of Duval-Carrié's work featuring After Heade–Moonlit Landscape, the first work the artist produced in the Imagined Landscapes series, which depicts a human figure in the center of the canvas surrounded by natural landscapes. The piece draws from the 19th century painting View from Fern-Tree Walk, authored by American painter Martin Johnson Heade. Heade traveled around the Caribbean, Central America, and South America, visiting Nicaragua, Brazil, Panama, Colombia, and Jamaica. His production was inspired by the traveling journals and drawings made by Alexander von Humboldt and Frederick Catherwood.

Duval-Carrié's work was included in the 61st Venice Biennale, "In Minor Keys" (2026), Central Pavillion exhibition.

The hand-painted uniforms of Haiti's 2026 Winter Olympics delegation, designed by Stella Jean, are based on a 2006 depiction of a mounted Toussaint Louverture by Carrié. Louverture's image was omitted from the uniform's final iteration due to Olympic regulations prohibiting political symbolism at the games, resulting in the uniforms only showing a charging horse.

== Collections ==
- Figge Art Museum, Davenport, Iowa
- Grinnell College Museum of Art, Grinnell, Iowa
- Museum of Art Fort Lauderdale
- Museum of Contemporary Art North Miami
- Pérez Art Museum Miami, Florida
- Musee des Art Africains et Oceaniens, Paris
- Musée du Panthéon National Haïtien, Port-au-Prince, Haiti
- Museo de Arte Contemporaneo de Monterrey, Monterrey, Mexico
- National Gallery of Art, Washington, D.C.
- The Detroit Institute of Arts
- Polk Museum of Art, Lakeland, Florida
- Musée du College St. Pierre, Port-au-Prince, Haiti
- Boca Raton Museum of Art
- Young At Art Museum, Davie, Florida

== Exhibitions ==
- March 13, 2014 - Aug. 31, 2014 Edouard Duval-Carrié: Imagined Landscapes, Pérez Art Museum Miami

== Publications ==
- Mason, Kara M. (2014). "From Revolution in the Tropics to Imagined Landscapes: The Art of Edouard Duval-Carrié." Florida: Pérez Art Museum Miami.
