= Dominique Kouas =

Beninese artist

- Born: 1952 (age 73–74); Benin
- Occupation: Artist
- Known for: Vodun art

Dominique "Kouas" Gnonnou (born 1952) is a contemporary Beninese artist and sculptor of Vodun art.

== Biography ==
Dominique "Kouas" Gnonnou was born in 1952 in Benin. He became an assistant and learned about the trade and restoration of destroyed and foraged artifacts and other pieces. Gnonnou's work is strongly influenced by traditional anonymous African artists from previous centuries. His home studio in Porto-Novo displays his unique style of contemporary art. with a wide range in a multitude of different media techniques used within his contemporary style. He has created a technique called Pein-tik, a combination of sculpture, painting, and batik. He is noted for his large metal-based works, which are on display in the International Festival of Vodun Arts and Cultures in Ouidah, but operates a studio in Porto Novo. Among his notable works is a sculpture of a "three-headed, three-footed, three-armed Mami Wata". Another is one which "depicts several faces bearing Fon (two on each cheek, temples, and forehead) and Yoruba (three on each cheek) scarification marks indicating their ethnic membership". The October Gallery in London is also in possession of his art. The work of the Artist achieved in the 80's and 90's is now considered as one of the most influent Beninoise contemporary visual art. His work takes part of the Jordan National Gallery of Fine Arts collection.

== Artworks ==
Dominique Kouas has his artwork displayed and sold across the United States, England, and Africa. known locally in Ouidah for his large metal sculptures, and is categorized among the first generation of artists after Benin's Independence. One of his most recognizable artworks is the depiction of Mami Wata, three-headed, three-footed, three-armed sculpture that was also displayed. This art piece is located at the suspected spot of the Tree of Forgetting. using religious ties, with vodun systems and history his aesthetic is derived from diversity, interpersonal, and displaying history with the idea of change and forward moving.

=== Gate of no return ===
Memorial gates painted in red, yellow, and white pigments, and the tall metal sculptures that tower next to them, marking the spot of the captive slaves. This memorial that has been worked on by Ahouangnimon, Yves Bandiera, Fortuné, 1953- Kouas, Dominique, 1952- Pèdé, Yves Apollinaire, 1959- highlights the gruesome Transatlantic Slave trade. Emphasizing the horror and reflection

=== The Guards with the Comb (2002) ===
A sculpture with the main medium being wood. Also includes Braided vegetable rope (dotôkan)

== Exhibitions ==
The International Festival of Vodun Arts and Cultures

Beginning in February 1993, an annual festival takes place in the historic beachside city of Ouidah, Benin on January 9–10. This festival is about bringing attention to culture, art, and the connection to the Transatlantic Vodun culture. This festival highlights the roles played by Benin slaves and what was endured. Many Benin and African diaspora artists participate in selling work for commission during the festival.

=== The October Gallery ===
Opening its doors in July 1985, SAMEDI Gallery highlights the African American Art industry with the physical art gallery located in Philadelphia, PA since 1985. It is one of the oldest African-American galleries nationally and has been up and running for 38 years. In the 1990s’ the gallery had six separate locations. These locations consisted of Old City on 2nd Street and The Gallery Mall East on Market Street; one in Cherry Hill, New Jersey; one in Echelon, New Jersey; one in Burlington, New Jersey; and one in Washington, DC. SYJÀNA

== Collections ==
Jordan National Gallery of Fine Arts

- "The Path of Migration"
