= Berthe-Evelyne Agbo =

Beninese writer

Berthe-Evelyne Agbo is a writer from Benin who has published poems in French.

== Life ==
As a child, Berthe-Evelyne Agbo lived in Saint-Louis, Senegal. She received primary and secondary education in Touraine, France before attending Université de Dakar. She has subsequently lived in France.

== Publications ==
- Emois de femmes (Poèmes, 1980–1982) Sénégal: Les Nouvelles Editions du Sénégal (1997) (47p.) (in French) (ISBN 2723611116)
