= Chantal Youdum =

Cameroonian film director and producer

- Occupations: Film director, film producer
- Years active: 2011-present

Chantal Youdum is a Cameroonian film director and producer.

== Biography ==
In 2011, Youdum created the TV series Au coeur de l'amour, which aired on TV5 and Canal 2. It was a soap opera of intrigue and revolves around a young woman who did not know her father, which featured the performance of Valérie Duval, who replaced the previous actress who was Rouène. She directed the film Sweet Dance in 2014, starring Pélagie Nguiateu and Alain Bomo Bomo. Sweet Dance is about Tatiana, who is torn between two loves, that of dancing and Jacques.

In 2016, Youdum was selected as one of seven women reshaping the African narrative by Femmes Lumiere. She served as the stage manager for the web series Aissa in 2017, which was directed by Jean Roke Patoudem. It tells the story of a young woman growing up without a mother and has to go live with her father in another village. Aissa premiered at the Panafrican Film and Television Festival of Ouagadougou and the Vues d'Afrique festival. Also that year, Youdum directed the film Rêve corrompu. It tells the tale of a young man who leaves his village hoping to thrive in the city, and it was selected in the Central African Documentary category at the 2018 Écrans Noirs Festival.

In 2018, Youdum co-created the TV series Mimi la Bobonne, alongside Francis Tene. It was screened at the Festival International de Films de Femmes in Yaoundé.
