= Simonet Biokou =

Beninese vodou artist

- Born: 1965 (age 60–61); Porto-Novo, Benin
- Occupation: Contemporary scrap metal artist

Simonet Biokou (born 1965) is a contemporary Beninese scrap metal artist. He has also appeared in film, playing himself in the 1998 film Divine Carcasse, in which his character is shown creating a sculpture using car parts. His works have been featured in major metropolitan museums including the Metropolitan Museum in New York.

== Biography ==
Simonet Biokou was born on July 7, 1965 in Porto-Novo, Benin. He comes from a family of blacksmiths who helped him acquire his skills with metal before pursuing art as a career. He started his journey along with his cousins and fellow scrap metal artists Calixte and Theodore Dakpogan, who at first did not support his decision to become an artist fearing that no one would buy his work. After seeing interest in his art from a man in the French Embassy who acquired one of his statues, they joined him in using recycled parts to make artworks. Both the brothers and Biokou were commissioned to contribute statues in Ouidah for Ouidah 92, a festival that brings attention to the African Diaspora in Benin and the slave route.

Biokou is based in Porto Novo, Benin, where Vodun (or Voodoo) is an official religion practiced by 40% of the population. His creative and symbolic pieces that highlight his cultural heritage have allowed him to become the only contemporary African sculptor exhibited at the Contemporary Art Museum of Liège, Belgium. He has frequently exhibited in Africa, Europe, and Canada.

== Artworks ==
A common theme in his artworks is the depiction of professions, like musicians or soldiers, as well as Voodoo spirits and priests. He utilizes recycled metal from different objects for his sculptures, like bicycle chains, car rims, gears, and screws.

- Les musiciens, scrap metal. Features two figures sitting together on a bench playing a guitar and a trumpet. The sculpture is mostly made out of wrenches to form the shape of the instruments. This is one example of the many sculptures he has featuring professions.
- Le commerce de l’homme, scrap metal. Features 4 human figures in a boat, some of them chained to each other and one rowing the boat representing the Atlantic slave trade and how they would transport enslaved people, a prominent theme in Biokou's artwork. He accompanies the title with "the enslavement of Africans".
- Dieu Ogoun, scrap metal. Features a figure representing Ogun, the god of iron in Voodoo culture, a great inspiration as well as one of the main subjects in Biokou's art. He is seen standing and holding a machete, a common item in other manifestations of Ogun.
- Une petite representation du Dieu du fer Ogou, scrap metal.
- Musicien, scrap metal.
- Porteur d'eau, scrap metal.
- Elisabeth III, scrap metal.
- Le joueur de djembé, scrap metal.
- Prêt à voler, scrap metal
- Le roi, scrap metal.
- Le sage, scrap metal.
- La compagnie, scrap metal.
- Le discours, scrap metal.
- Pause clope, scrap metal.
- Le couple, scrap metal.
- La pintade, scrap metal.
- Le troisème âge, scrap metal.
- Femme enceinte, scrap metal.
- Le socle, scrap metal.
- Zangbeto, scrap metal.
- Ogou, scrap metal.

== Exhibitions ==
=== Group exhibitions ===
- Festival vidéo, Liège, Belgium.
- Les internationales, Liège, Belgium.
- Rencontres internationales d'été, Castelnaudary, France.
- Centre d'animations Louis Lumière, Paris, France.
- Migrations culturelles, Bordeaux, France.
- Musée Ethnographique, Geneva, Switzerland.
- Semaine de la Francophonie, Accra, Ghana.
- Rencontres internationales d'été, Castelnaudary, France.
- Centre Culturel Saint Exupéry, Libreville, Gabon.
- Ouag'Art, Ouagadougou, Burkina Faso.
- Ingénieuse Afrique, Musée des Civilisations, Canada, Ivory Coast, Senegal, Benin.
- Agnès b., Paris, France.
- Art Vaudou, Galerie de Nesle, Paris, France.

=== Solo exhibitions ===
- Simonet Biokou, Centre Culturel Français, Cotonou, Benin.
- Bangui, Centre-Afrique Ambassade des Etats-Unis, Cotonou, Benin.
- Centre Culturel Franco-Nigérien, Niamey, Niger.
- Gatobar, Lomé, Togo.
- Club des Nations Unies, Cotonou, Benin.

== Collections ==
- Jura Isabelle Art Gallery
- Contemporary art Museum of Liège
