= Julien Sinzogan =

Beninese painter and graphic artist (born 1957)

- Born: 1957 (age 68–69); Porto Novo, Benin
- Occupation: Painter

Julien Sinzogan (born 1957), is a Beninese contemporary painter and graphic artist. His artwork actively engages the impact of the Atlantic Slave Trade on his native Benin, one of the largest slave-trading posts of West Africa. He has exhibited widely throughout Europe and Africa. As a professional artist Sinzogan's techniques and references move from areas of monochrome pen and ink into glimpses of full-color scenes. He lives in Paris, France.

== Early life and education ==
Julien Sinzogan was born on 27 January 1957 in Porto Novo, Republic of Benin. Sinzogan's education began studying architecture at the Art School of Tashkent, Uzbekistan, from 1978 to 1979. He studied architecture in Paris, France, at the École Spéciale des Travaux Publics, du bâtiment et de l'industrie, Paris, until 1982. A year later, Sinzogan studied at Laboratoire International de Calcul et d’Informatique Appliquée (L.I.C.I.A.), Paris, France, where he ran the department of computer images, before turning to painting professionally.

== Career ==
Sinzogan is inspired by the Yoruba Divinatory and Ifá. In this, he explores the journeys between the tangible world of Aye as well as the departure to the spirit world Orun and are then reborn, and portrays how closely they are related. Sinzogan also has two parallel themes seen this work: belief in the transmigration of African "soul" and the return of the spirits of slaves to African shores; "real crime" of slavery was in the loss of protective ancestral spirits of the communities that remained in Africa.

Sinzogan's technique reflects the interaction between the different worlds such as the "Western" world, in which his use of symbolism evolves according to well-defined traditions and the African world and the rich sculptural history of Benin art. Symbolism is very important to Sinzogan as he describes it "…the symbol has a amplitude immeasurable and opens the imagination by wearing colors and philosophies of life". A trademark symbol of Sinzogan's is the portrayal of complex realities with a black circular symbol signifying remembrance of the dead, and by those still living.

Sinzogan had a solo show at the October Gallery, in the celebration of Black History Month in United Kingdom. For this exhibition, Sinzogan was commissioned to create a piece he calls "Gates of Return" in response to his previous piece "Gates of No Return".

In the "Gates of No Return", Sinzogan depicts the slave-trading nations that affected the West African coastline for centuries. The gates symbolize prison gates. Sinzogan says: "...there are voyages which should never have been-the Middle passage for example. There are spiritual voyages, such as a meeting with babalawo [a divining priest] well known for traveling between visible and invisible worlds…and there are imaginary voyages, through Gates of Return, and Gates of no Return." Sinzogan's vision attempts to reconcile and bring closure to this chapter in history.

== Exhibitions ==
=== Solo exhibitions ===
- 2003: French National Assembly, Paris, France
- 2008: Journées ébène, Voyages: la porte du retour, Musée de la peinture de Grenoble, Grenoble, France.
- 2009: Chemins d’esclaves, Museum of Angoulême, Angoulême, France.
- 2010: Spirit Worlds, October Gallery, London, UK.

=== Group exhibitions ===
- 1990: Gallery Gabor Uzvesky, Bussy Saint-Georges, France
- 1991: Ministère de l’Education Nationale, Paris, France.
- 1992: Ecole pour l'Informatique et les Techniques Avancées (E.P.I.T.A.), Paris, France.
- 1993: Petit Palais, Cotonou, Benin.
  - Ouidah '92: First International Festival of the Arts and Cultures of Vodun, Ouidah and Cotonou, Benin.
- 1994: Espace Kauffman-Eiffel, Paris, France.
- 1996: Hôtel Novotel, Cotonou, Benin.
- 1997: 7th Plein Sud Festival, Cozes, France.
- 1997-99: Permanent exhibition, Centre Français du Cadre, Paris, France.
- 1999: Maison de l’Ile, Auvers sur Oise, France.
  - D'Afrique et de Cuba, André Malraux Cultural Centre, Le Bourget, France.
  - Couleurs Vodun, Lille Town Hall, Lille, France.
- 2000: Rendering Visible, October Gallery, London, UK.
- 2001: Journées Béninoises, Dourdan, France. The Power of the Word Exhibition, Archive Centre, Churchill College, Cambridge, UK
- 2002: The Royal Museum and Art Gallery, Canterbury, UK.
  - Permanent exhibition, Atelier de l’Yvette, Épinay sur Orge, France.
  - A Thousand Ways of Being: Memory and Presence in the Arts of Diasporas, October Gallery, London, UK.
- 2003: Transvangarde: Zeitgenössische Kunst aus der Welt (Contemporary Art from Around the Planet) and Kulturbrauerei, Pferdestall Gallery, Berlin, Germany.
- 2004: Artists from Around the World, October Gallery, London, UK
- 2005: Aux Grain d'Argent, Angoulême, France. Agence Française pour le Développement (AFD), Paris, France.
- 2006: 17th Salon International, Château de Beauregard, Caen, France
- 2007: Uncomfortable Truths: the shadow of slave trading on contemporary art and design, Victoria and Albert Museum, London.
  - Voyages: Crossing the Lake of Fire, October Gallery, London, UK.
- 2008: Johannesburg Art Fair, October Gallery, Johannesburg, South Africa, and Angaza Africa, African Art Now and Spring Show, October Gallery, London, UK.
- 2009: Johannesburg Art Fair, October Gallery, Johannesburg, South Africa.
- 2010: L'Art Actuel d’Afrique, Collégiale Saint-André, Chartres, France.
