= Meschac Gaba =

Beninese conceptual artist

- Born: 1961 (age 63–64); Cotonou, Benin
- Occupation: Artist
- Known for: The Museum of Contemporary African Art 1997–2002

Meschac Gaba (born 1961) is a Beninese conceptual artist based in Rotterdam and Cotonou. His installations of everyday objects whimsically juxtapose African and Western cultural identities and commerce. He is best known for The Museum of Contemporary African Art 1997–2002, an autobiographical 12-room installation acquired and displayed by the Tate Modern in 2013. He has also exhibited at the Studio Museum in Harlem and at the 2003 Venice Biennale.

== Early life and career ==
Meschac Gaba was born in Cotonou, Benin, in 1961. He had drifted from his training as a painter until a bag of decommissioned money cut into confetti led him to make paintings with the material. Gaba became known for his installations of everyday objects that whimsically juxtapose African and Western cultural identities and commerce.

He held a residency at the Amsterdam Rijksakademie in 1996 for two years. In the absence of opportunities to display his work in the city, he set out over the next five years to make his own museum. This piece became his seminal The Museum of Contemporary African Art 1997–2002, which consists of 12 rooms (some based on museum function and others personal) filled with objects made by Gaba. Throughout the exhibition ran a vein of confessional narrative about the artist's art travails between Africa and Europe. The wedding room, which he made while in love, holds mementos as museum artifacts from Gaba's wedding to the Dutch curator Alexandra van Dongen in 2000 at the Amsterdam Stedelijk Museum. The Library room holds art books and tells of Gaba's childhood. The games room showed sliding puzzle tables that form African national flags. It had its own gift shop and café. The exhibited Museum had couches for reading, a piano for playing, and featured objects reflecting Africa's polycultural character, including Ghanaian money featuring the face of Picasso, a Swiss bank mimicking an African street market, and gilded ceramic chicken legs.

The Museum exhibited widely. The work was first displayed in part in 2002 at Documenta 11. Gaba received a Rotterdam space in which he could live and store the work. When his son requested a more normal house, Gaba sold and gifted most of the work to the Tate Modern, save for his Library, which Gaba returned to his hometown. Around 2013, Gaba lived half the year in his hometown of Cotonou and the other half in Rotterdam with his wife and son. The Tate Modern displayed the work as a whole in 2013 as part of the Tate's two-year program of African-focused exhibitions. The wedding room enchanted the British art critic Jonathan Jones, who described the Museum as autobiographical, novelistic, protest showing "the strength of modern African art". For instance, the Art and Religion room showed "classic" African ceremonial sculpture alongside kitschy Buddhist and Christian objects, as if to group the types together as poor representations of their respective cultures. Gaba saw the work as correcting lacks of art education in Africa and African art representation outside the continent.

In-between finishing the Museum and its Tate exhibition, Gaba presented at the 2003 Venice Biennale and held his first solo show in the United States at the Studio Museum in Harlem, "Tresses", a series of architectural models of New York City and Benin landmarks made from artificial braided hair extensions. The accessory, popularized by African-American pop stars based on West African culture, was repatriated to Africa. Gaba worked with a Beninese hair braider to make the sculptures from his photographs. Holland Cotter wrote in The New York Times that the works were "delightful" and recognizable without becoming caricatures.

Gaba held his first solo gallery show, "Exchange Market", in New York in 2014. On the ground floor, 10 sculptures of unvarnished wood tables each with a wire umbrella stand, from which African banknotes hung. Each table was associated with a type of commodity: cotton, cocoa, diamonds. Along the walls hung bank-shaped works made of wood, plexiglass, and decommissioned money. Upstairs, reminiscent of the games room of Gaba's museum, were four foosball tables and small souvenir sculptures such as hand-painted cricket bats and a miniature billiards table.

Artsy selected Gaba's work as a highlight of the 2014 1:54 London art fair.

== Selected exhibitions ==
- "Exchange Market", Tanya Bonakdar Gallery, New York City, 2014
- "Museum of Contemporary African Art", Tate Modern, 2013
- "Tresses", Studio Museum in Harlem, 2005
