= Elvire Adjamonsi =

Beninese filmmaker (born 1971)

- Born: February 18, 1971 (age 55)
- Education: Pan African Institute for Development (IPD)
- Occupations: Film director, actor, journalist, cultural developer

Elvire Adjamonsi (born February 18, 1971) is a Beninese filmmaker, actor, journalist and cultural developer. She is known for her documentary films and for her work in creating and managing film festivals and cultural institutions across Africa.

== Biography ==
Adjamonsi was born in Benin, and completed her BA in Visual communication at the Pan African Institute for Development (IPD) in Burkina Faso. She made her first documentary film shortly after finishing her studies. De l'eau toute l'année (Water All Year) is a 26-minute film about the mini-dams in Burkina Faso. Her script, "Bidossessi", won second place in the Apromedia competition, held in collaboration with Alliance Française de Bangui. The script was selected in 2004 to participate in the Sud Ecriture development workshop in Morocco and Tunisia, which is supported by the Organisation internationale de la Francophonie, Centre national du cinéma et de l'image animée, and the Hubert Balls Foundation.

In 2010 she wrote her first short, La Maudite (The Accursed), which was screened at the first Francophone Film Festival in Atakpamé (Togo), and then another short, Cica la petite Sorcière (Cica the Little Witch). She then created another documentary film, Tolegba, about the Beninise god of the same name, who is considered to be a demon, and yet protects the people.

Adjamonsi participated in several television series as an actor, the best-known of which are "Un tour de vis" and "Baobab", which were broadcast across Africa. She also worked as an assistant director on Channel 2 (La Chaîne 2) in Benin.

In addition to her film work, Adjamonsi began working as a journalist and graphic designer. She has worked for various publications, including the French magazine of African culture, Afiavi Magazine, and several Beninese newspaper, including Le Progrès, l'Aurore, Fraternité, and Le Béninois.

Adjamonsi is best-known for her work in cultural development, particularly in French-speaking countries with little to no government support for culture. She has founded and managed film, theater and music festivals, including: LAGUNIMAGE (Benin, 2000), Les Journées Théâtrales en Campagne (Pointe-Noire, 2003–2004); Le Ngombi (Bangui, 2001); FITHEB (Benin, 2006); NSANGU NDJINDJI (Pointe-Noire, 2008); FITHA (Ivory Coast), RCG (Kinshasa); Wedbinde à Kaya (Burkina Faso); JOUTHEC (Pointe-Noire, Congo-Brazza) and @fricourt. In 2016, she organized a puppet theater festival and a street art festival. In addition, Adjamonsi works with orchestras, theater companies, cultural institutions, production companies, and broadcast authorities. Her goal is to make Africa into a world hub of arts and culture.
