= Calixte Dakpogan =

Beninese sculptor (born 1958)

- Born: 1958 (age 67–68); Pahou, Benin
- Occupation: Sculptor
- Known for: installation art

Calixte Dakpogan (born 1958) is a Beninese sculptor known for his installations as well as his masks made out of diverse and original found materials. A native of Pahou, he currently lives and works in Porto-Novo. Much of his work is inspired by his Vodun heritage.

Dakpogan's work was exhibited at the "Ouidah '92" festival, which celebrated Vodun art from Benin and the African Diaspora in Ouidah, Benin in February 1993. Many of his masks are part of The Contemporary African Art Collection (CAAC) of Jean Pigozzi and are exhibited in major group shows in museums around the world.

== Group exhibitions ==
- 2000: Rendering Visible : Contemporary Art from the Republic of Benin, October Gallery, London, UK
- 2000: Partage d’Exotismes, 5th Biennale de Lyon, France
- 2000: Fait Maison, Musée international des arts modestes, Sète, France
- 2005: African Art Now : Masterpieces from the Jean Pigozzi Collection, Museum of Fine Arts, Houston, USA
- 2005: Arts of Africa, Grimaldi Forum, Monaco, France
- 2006/2007: 100% Africa, Guggenheim Museum Bilbao, Spain
- 2007: Masques rituels et contemporains, Fondation Jean Paul Blachère, Apt, France
- 2007/2008: Why Africa?, Pinacoteca Giovanni e Marella Agnelli, Turin, Italy
- 2010: African Stories, Marrakech Art Fair, Marrakech

== Bibliography ==
- 1994: Otro pais: escalas africanas, Exhibition catalogue.
- 1992: Dakar Biennale (1). Dak’Art 92, Exhibition catalogue
- 1995: Africus : Johannesburg Biennale, 1995 Exhibition catalogue.
- 1996: Contemporary Art of Africa, André Magnin and Jacques Soulillou
- 1997: Lumière Noire : Art Contemporain, Exhibition catalogue.
- 1998: Bénin-Bénin, Gisteren-Tussen-Morgen. Exhibition catalogue. Fritz Bless et al.
- 2000: Forjar el Espacio : La Escultura Forjada en el siglo XX, Exhibition catalogue.
- 2000: Lyon Biennale d’Art Contemporain, (5) Partage d’Exotismes, Exhibition catalogue.
- 2001: Rendering Visible : Contemporary Art from the Republic of Benin, Exhibition catalogue. Published by The October Gallery.
- 2005: African Art Now: Masterpieces from the Jean Pigozzi Collection, Exhibition catalogue. Published by Merrell.
- 2006: 100% Africa, Exhibition catalogue. Published by TF Editores & FMGB Guggenheim Bilbao Museum.
- 2007: Why Africa?, Exhibition catalogue. Published by Electa & Pinacoteca Giovanni e Marella Agnelli.
