= Yves Apollinaire Pede =

Beninese artist (1959–2019)

- Born: 1959; Abomey, Benin
- Died: 2019 (aged 59–60); Ouidah, Benin
- Occupation: Artist
- Known for: voodoo

Yves Apollinaire Pede (1959–2019) was a Beninese voodoo artist. After being commissioned to reproduce reliefs for the Abomey Museum, he made sand paintings of well-known personalities such as Nelson Mandela. He gradually developed an interest in textile art, drawing inspiration from Haitian and Cuban Vodou artists. In addition to his work in textiles, he is also known for creating large cement sculptures and bas-reliefs. His work is said to reflect a special interest in Kulito, a Fon term meaning “the one from the path of death.”

Pede was born in 1959, in Abomey, Benin. He was based in Ouidah, the world centre for Vodun art, which has an annual festival. He died in 2019 in Ouidah, Benin.
