= Cyprien Tokoudagba =

Beninese artist (1939–2012)

- Born: 1939; Abomey, Benin
- Died: May 5, 2012 (aged 72–73)
- Occupations: Painter, Sculptor

Cyprien Tokoudagba (1939 – 5 May 2012) was a Beninese sculptor and painter. He was from Abomey, Benin.

== Biography ==
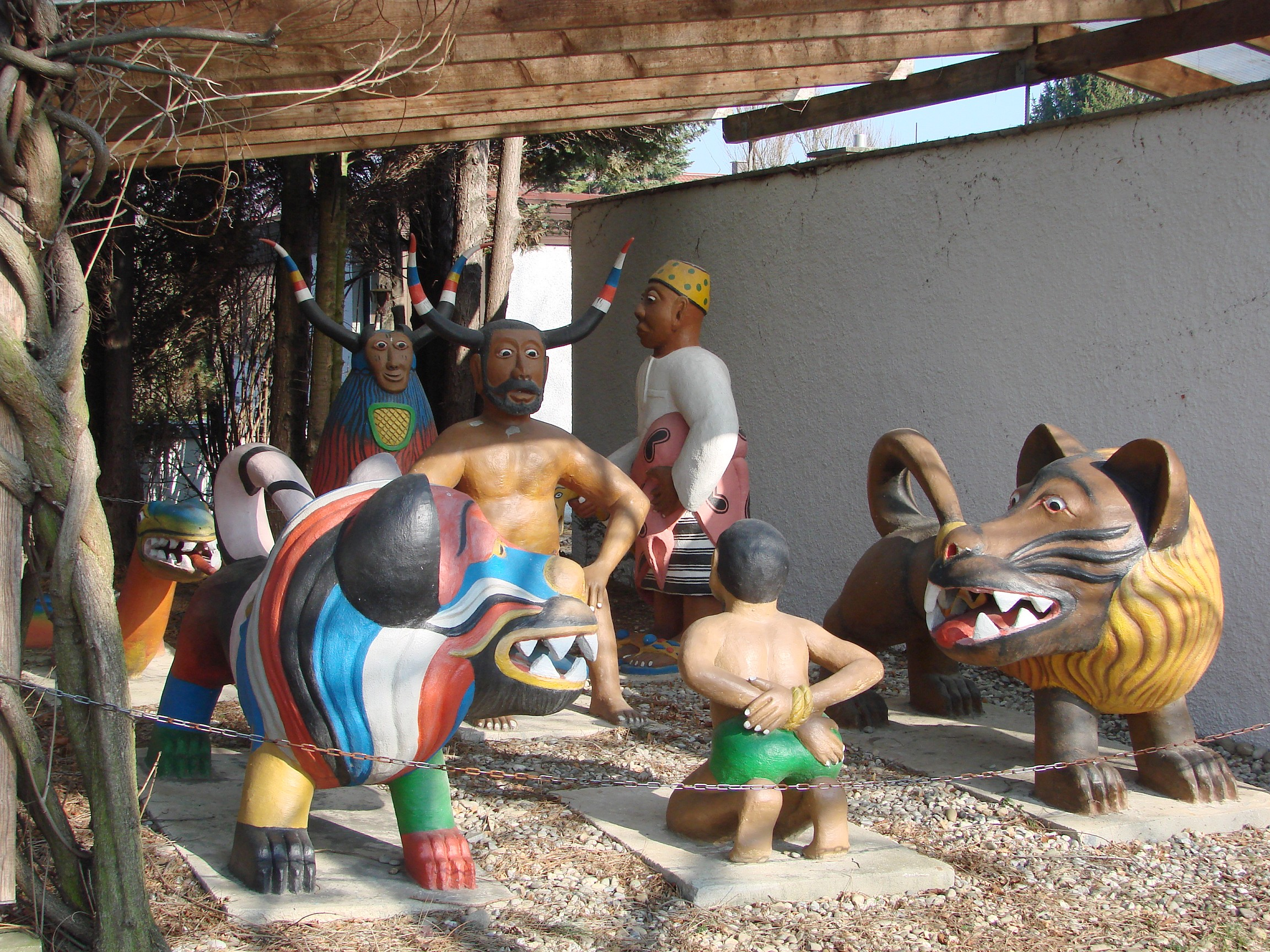
Sculptures by Tokoudagba

He started to work as an art restorer for the Abomey Museum in 1987, when he was hired to replicate the original bas-reliefs that told many of Dahomey's legends and stories while celebrating the individual kings for the new King Glelé royal palace façade, among the Royal Palaces of Abomey reconstructed by the government of Benin.

Tokoudagba continued the tradition of bas-relief though the use of cement and commercially available synthetic paint, while also producing works on canvas, frescoes and monumental sculptures. In 1989, Cyprien left Benin for the first time to exhibit at “Magiciens de la Terre” in Paris, France.

Tokoudagba's work was exhibited at the "Ouidah '92" festival, which celebrated Vodun art from Benin and the African Diaspora in Ouidah, Benin in February 1993. His works have also been exhibited in the following museums: Smithsonian institution - National Museum of African Art, Washington, DC; Musée Dapper, Paris, France; Museum Kunst Palast, Düsseldorf, Germany; Hayward Gallery, London, Englands; Centre Georges Pompidou, Paris, France; Mori Art Museum, Tokyo, Japan; São Paulo Biennale, Brazil.
