= Theodore Dakpogan =

Beninese artist

- Born: Benin
- Occupation: Artist
- Known for: Vodou

Theodore Dakpogan is a Beninese Vodou artist. His work is influenced by 19th century Fon sculpture. He is noted for his scrap metal sculptures. The artist from Benin is a former blacksmith. Using discarded pieces of iron, he creates works of art, connecting them with the roots of the Vodun religion. As a modern artist, he shows an interest in the tensions between the past and the present, between the "First" and "Third" worlds. His works of art created from discarded things of consumerism and mass production, point to the unresolved state of postcolonial Africa.
