= Center for Photography at Woodstock =

Non-profit arts organization

- Abbreviation: CPW
- Formation: 1977
- Founders: Howard Greenberg and Michael Feinberg
- Founded at: Woodstock
- Location: 474 Broadway, Kingston, New York
- Website: cpw.org
- Formerly called: Catskill Center for Photography

The Center for Photography at Woodstock, more recently known as CPW, is a not-for-profit artist-centered organization to develop and promote contemporary photography, located in Kingston, New York. It began operations in 1977 under the name Catskill Center for Photography and was located in Woodstock until 2022. The center offers various programs from exhibitions and workshops to artist residencies and access to professional workspace. In 2022, CPW relocated from Woodstock to Kingston, NY and in January 2025, opened its new headquarters in the former G.W. Van Slyke & Co. cigar factory. The building now houses a photography museum, and an educational and community center in a 40,000-square-foot, four-story space.

== History ==
CPW was founded in February 1977 by photographers Howard Greenberg and Michael Feinberg. The organization was intended as a gathering place for local photographers. It was initially called the Catskill Center for Photography, and it opened with a series of workshops and an exhibition of works by Walker Evans and Paul Strand.

CPW moved in 2021 to a storefront space on Broadway in the Midtown Arts District of Kingston, NY. In February 2023, CPW purchased the historic Van Slyke & Horton cigar factory. Built in 1907, this four-story, 40,000-square-foot industrial building features a red-brick exterior, open floor plans, sixteen-foot ceilings, and windows on all four sides, with unobstructed views of the Catskills. Over 2,400 people attended a grand opening on January 24, 2024, which featured three major new exhibitions. Currently the space has four exhibition galleries, a digital nedia lab, a library, classrooms, photography studios, a film screening room, community meeting rooms, staff offices, and a collection storage facility and study center.

== Notable instructors ==
Throughout its history CPW has brought in many notable artists and educators to lead workshops including most recently Sam Abell, Jackie Bates, Dawoud Bey, Elinor Carucci, Sabiha Çimen, Carolyn Drake, Tim Davis, Wendy Ewald, Ron Haviv, Ed Kashi, Justine Kurland, Baldwin Lee, Raymond Meeks, Mary Ellen Mark, Andrew Moore.

== Programs ==
CPW's educational programs include year-round workshops and classes which allow artists to explore and focus on specific topics in an intimate and personal setting. Beginning in 1978, the workshops range on topics, skills, and age level, from learning about antiquated photographic processes to expanding ones smartphone photography. There are select workshops where instructors will also give a lecture that is open to the public.

=== Woodstock AIR ===
The Woodstock Artist in Residency program was established in 1999, and has provided services for over 195 artists to date. It is named one of the top 20 artist residencies the country by Artinfo. Founded to support artists of color who have been historically excluded from mainstream opportunities, this residency provides photographers with financial support and a month of time and space to break new ground, advance their artistic vision, or complete ongoing projects. The program provides full use of CPW's facilities, support, and time. Participants receive honorarium, housing, food and travel stipend, and significantly reduced rates on materials.

=== Past and Notable AIRs ===
- Nydia Blas
- Sabiha Çimen
- William Cordova
- Jeremy Dennis
- Lola Flash
- LaToya Ruby Frazier
- Nikita Gale
- Kris Graves
- Deana Lawson
- Gina Osterloh
- Keisha Scarville
- Paul Mpagi Sepuya
- Xaviera Simmons
- Kunie Sugiura
- Daniella Zalcman

== Permanent print collection ==
The CPW Collection of photographs provides the basis for exhibitions, study, and research. It consists of approximately 4,500 photographs covering the history of the medium as well as video works, audiotapes, slides, and photo books. The collection focuses on contemporary American photography, from 1970 to the present, with important holdings by over 400 photographers, as well as local and vernacular materials. Among the distinctive groups within the collection are the Woodstock History Anthology, the Bruce Davidson Archive, and the Woodstock AIR Collection, a unique assemblage of works by over 150 participants in the CPW artist residency that supports a critical dialogue on diversity, race, identity, and social justice. Selections from the CPW Collection can be viewed online at the Hudson Valley Visual Arts Collection Consortium (HVVACC).

Many of the works have been donated by artists and private donors. In the past, CPW purchased a work by an artist featured in its annual Photography Now exhibition. Participants in CPW's WOODSTOCK AIR program are required to contribute a sample of their completed work to the collection which serves as an archive of CPW's program activities.

=== Key works ===
- Elinor Carucci
- Larry Fink
- David Maisel
- Mary Ellen Mark
- Andrea Modica
- Stephen Shore
- Aaron Siskind
- W. Eugene Smith
- Edward Weston
- Minor White
- Gaede/ Striebel Archive

=== Dorsky partnership ===
Between 1995 and 2024, CPW's permanent print collection was on extended loan at the Samuel Dorsky Museum of Art (SDMA). The SDMA has been open since 2000 and is one of the largest art museums within the SUNY system, with over 17,000 square feet. SDMA is a vital resource to the community in showing historical and contemporary art and has their own permanent collection including over 5,000 works. The museum periodically mounted exhibitions culled from CPW's collection including:

- All Hot and Bothered curated by Ariel Shanberg and Brian Wallace (June 27 – September 28, 2008)
- Thoughts of Home curated by Wayne Lempka (January 26 – March 18, 2011)
- Race, Love, and Labor curated by Sarah Lewis (August 27 – December 14, 2014)

== Photography Quarterly ==
Photography Quarterly, created in 1979 by the original founders, began as a black and white brochure, aimed to spread ideas and awareness about fine art photography beyond Woodstock. The publication evolved into a full color, 60-page spread magazine featuring exhibitions, curatorial essays, and artist portfolios. PQ was last published in 2009.

== Photographers' Fellowship fund ==
=== Program history ===
The Fellowship fund began in 1980 and has given over $77,000 to 87 regional artists. When the fund began it was initially awarded to two artists who received $1,000 each. It evolved into a single award to one artist a year, who receives $2,500. The awarded fellow is required to donate a work to CPW's Permanent Print Collection. The Fellowship fund is no longer active.

=== Notable recipients ===
- Lucinda Devlin
- Kenro Izu
- Andrea Modica

== Services for artists ==
=== Workspace ===
CPW has a Digital Media Lab that The Center for Photography at Woodstock is equipped with state of the art digital lab, darkroom, and library.

==== Darkroom ====
The Darkroom is equipped for black-and-white film processing and printing. Staff provide support and mentors users.

==== Library ====
The Library includes over 1,500 monographs, exhibition catalogs, texts, and periodicals and is open to the public. This library is one of the most extensive photographic collections in the region including monographs, exhibition catalogs, critical texts, and publications including Aperture, Art Papers, Nueva Luz, PQ and Blindspot.

Recent additions have been made such as, Brian Ulrich's Is This Place Great or What?, Robert Adams' The Place We Live, Michal Chelbi's The Black Eye, and Diego Uchitel's Polaroids.

=== Photographer's Salon ===
The photographers' Salon is a critic group that meets once a month and is run by Richard Edelman and Carlos Loret de Mola. The Salon was previously run by Lilo Raymond and Dan McCormack in the 70's and 80's and then led by Harriet Tannin and Levi Cruz in the 90's. The Salon allows artists to gain new and insightful perspective from other artists in the area and gives them a chance to give and receive useful feedback.

=== Membership ===
There are several levels of membership at CPW: basic, advanced, student, senior, friend/family, and patron. Memberships provide support for the organization, and each is given specific benefits.

== Board of directors ==
The Board currently consists of 13 elected members who give support to CPW and play an active role in the organization's affairs.

- Howard Greenberg – Founder, Chair
- Stan Sagner – President
- Barry Mayo – Vice President
- Clinton Cargill – Treasurer
- Jesse Blatt – Secretary
- Alex Davis
- Michael Knauth
- Aaron Rezny
- Jed Root
- Tevis Trower
- William Van Roden
- Steven Wechsler
- Andy Young

(as of June 2018)
