= Craig Easton (photographer) =

British photographer

- Occupation: Photographer
- Known for: Long‑term social documentary photography

Craig Easton is a British photographer who lives in Bristol and works on long-term social documentary projects that deal with the representation of communities in the North of England. He has made work about the inter-generational nature of poverty and economic hardship in Northern England; about women working in the UK fish processing industry; about social deprivation, housing, unemployment and immigration in Blackburn; and about how the situation in which young people throughout the UK live, influences their aspirations.

Easton's Fisherwomen has been published as a book and shown in solo exhibitions at Time & Tide Museum, Shetland Museum, Montrose Museum and Hull Maritime Museum. The group project he organised, Sixteen, was exhibited all over the UK in 2019/20. He has been overall winner of Travel Photographer of the Year, and in 2021 was awarded Photographer of the Year at the Sony World Photography Awards. for his work Bank Top, later published as a monograph by GOST Books and toured extensively. His work is held in the collections of Hull Maritime Museum, Salford University and the University of St Andrews.

Easton's Is Anybody Listening? exhibition brought together two series Bank Top and Thatcher's Children and launched as a touring show at Open Eye Gallery in Liverpool in 2023.

An Extremely Un-get-atable Place: George Orwell on Jura was published by GOST Books in 2025.

== Early life and education ==
Easton was born in Edinburgh and grew up in Liverpool. He studied Physics at the University of Salford in the 1980s.

== Life and work ==
He began his photography career working as a photojournalist at The Independent newspaper in the early 1990s. For an article in 1992, Easton made black and white photographs of the Williams family in Blackpool that "exposed Thatcherism's legacy of child poverty." In 1997, he left The Independent and pursued more long-term photography projects.

Fisherwomen, made between 2013 and at least 2017 using a large format film camera, references the early social documentary photography of David Octavius Hill and Robert Adamson. In 1843, Hill and Adamson photographed the Newhaven fishwives who processed caught fish. Easton's project follows the historical trail of itinerant workers who followed the traditional herring fleet, from Unst in Shetland to Great Yarmouth in Norfolk. Fisherwomen documents, in colour, the connection between previous generations and contemporary workers, still largely women, now almost all working indoors in processing factories and smokehouses.

From 2016 to 2020, he again found and photographed three generations of the same Williams family in the North of England, in a series in colour about the inter-generational nature of poverty and economic hardship. The monograph Thatcher's Children, GOST Books, 2023, brought together both bodies of work from 1992 and 2016-2020 and was recognised with a Special Award for 'Exposing Britain's Social Evils' at The Orwell Prize in the same year.

Since 2019, Easton has been documenting the neighbourhood of Bank Top in Blackburn. His black and white portraits, and occasional landscapes, made within about a 500 m radius, highlight social deprivation, housing, unemployment and immigration. The work is accompanied by text by local writer and researcher Abdul Aziz Hafiz. The series is part of an initiative by Blackburn Museum and Art Gallery, called Kick Down the Barriers, in which artists and writers collaborate with residents of Blackburn in representing their community. The initiative is a response to a 2007 BBC Panorama TV programme that claimed Blackburn was "one of the most segregated towns in Britain". This view has persisted in media representation of the town ever since, but locals refute it. Easton is using an 8×10 large format film camera for the work. It was published as a book in 2022.

Sixteen was a group photography project conceived and led by Easton where by he and fifteen other photographers collaborated with 16-year-olds from various social backgrounds all around the UK. The young people responded to questions about what it means to be sixteen. "The work challenges the notion of meritocracy and examines how social background, ethnicity, gender, location, education, health etc all influence what young people think they can achieve in life." The other photographers were Linda Brownlee, David Copeland, Lottie Davies, Jillian Edelstein, Stuart Freedman, Sophie Gerrard, Kalpesh Lathigra, Roy Mehta, Christopher Nunn, Kelly O'Brien, Kate Peters, Michelle Sank, Abbie Trayler-Smith, Simon Roberts and Robert C Brady. The work was shown in galleries and outdoors all over the UK in 2019/20.

== Publications ==
=== Publications by Easton ===
- Fisherwomen. Ten O'Clock Books, 2020. Edition of 500 copies. Portfolio format.
- Bank Top. London: GOST Books, 2022. ISBN 978-1-910401-68-2. With an essay and field notes by Abdul Aziz Hafiz. The book was shortlisted for the Paris Photo-Aperture Photobook Award, 2022, Rencontres d'Arles Book Award, 2022 and the Kraszna-Krausz book award, 2023
- Thatcher's Children. GOST Books. 2022 ISBN 978-1-910401-68-2 – with an essay by Jack Shenker.
- An Extremely Un-get-atable Place, 2025 GOST Books, 2025 ISBN 978-1-80598-014-8 – with an afterword by Richard Blair, son of George Orwell.

=== Publications with others ===
- Sheepfolds. Michael Hue-Williams Fine Art,1996. With Andy Goldsworthy. ISBN 978-1900829014
- 52 Weekends by the Sea. Virgin, 2010. With Brigid Benson. ISBN 978-0753519325.

== Awards ==
- 2012: Overall winner, Travel Photographer of the Year, UK, with 2 photographs from Sixteen
- 2017: Winner, FC Barcelona Photo Awards, Barcelona, Spain, with a photograph from Sixteen
- 2017: Finalist, Taylor Wessing Photographic Portrait Prize, National Portrait Gallery, London
- 2021: Photographer of the Year, Sony World Photography Awards, London. A $25,000 prize.
- 2021: Winner, Portraiture category, Sony World Photography Awards, London
- 2023: The Arnold Newman Prize for New Directions in Photographic Portraiture, Maine Media
- 2023: Special Prize for long term commitment to 'Exposing Britain's Social Evils', Orwell Prize

== Exhibitions ==
=== Solo exhibitions ===
- Fisherwomen, Montrose Museum, Montrose, Angus, Scotland, 2019; Hull Maritime Museum, Hull, England, 2019 Time & Tide Museum, Great Yarmouth, England, 2021, Oriel Colwyn, Colwyn Bay, Wales, 2022 Shetland Museum & Archive, Lerwick, Scotland, 2023.
- Fisherwomen, DATMA, New Bedford, Massachusetts, USA, 2021
- Homeless: Eight stories from Buckinghamshire, England, Waterside Theatre, Aylesbury, England, 2022 Wycombe Arts Centre, High Wycombe, England 2022
- Bank Top, Somerset House, London, England, 2022, The New Adelphi Gallery, Salford, England 2023
- Craig Easton: Is Anybody Listening?, Open Eye Gallery, Liverpool, England, 2023. Left Coast, Blackpool, England, 2023 The Williamson Art Gallery and Museum, Birkenhead, England, 2024
- Thatcher's Children, The New Adelphi Gallery, Salford, England, 2023
- Return to Mingulay, Wardlaw Museum, St. Andrews, Scotland, 2023-2024
- Havens: Stories and Portraits from NHS Lothian, Stills Centre for Photography, Edinburgh, Scotland, 2024 with Lottie Davies
- An Extremely Un-get-atable Place, Ropes & Twines, Liverpool, England, 2025

=== Group exhibitions ===
- Taylor Wessing Photographic Portrait Prize exhibition, National Portrait Gallery, London, 2017-2018.
- Sixteen, HOME, Manchester, 2019; Format Festival, Derby Market Hall, Derby, 2019;Open Eye Gallery, Liverpool, 2019; Coed Pella, Colwyn Bay, during Northern Eye festival, 2019; Ellesmere Port Library, Ellesmere Port, 2019; outside in Lerwick, Shetland, 2019; outside Parkside Gallery, Birmingham City University, 2019; Belfast Exposed, Belfast, 2019; outside in Trongate, Glasgow, 2020; Photofusion, London
- Tales from the Colony Room: Art & Bohemia, Dellasposa Gallery, London, England 2020
- Kick Down the Barriers, Blackburn Museum and Art Gallery, 2020. Included Bank Top, photographs by Easton and text by Abdul Aziz Hafiz.
- Taylor Wessing Photographic Portrait Prize exhibition, National Portrait Gallery, London, England, 2022. Scottish National Portrait Gallery, Edinburgh, Scotland, 2023.
- Bank Top, The Griffin Museum of Photography, Winchester, MA, USA, 2023
- Wonderland - The Joy of Analogue Photography, 1955-1995, Yorkton Workshops, London, England 2025
- Manifest Destiny, The Griffin Museum of Photography, Winchester, MA, USA, 2026

== Collections ==
Easton's work is held in the following permanent collection:

- Hull Maritime Museum, Hull: selected works from Fisherwomen
- Salford University Art Collection, Salford: Sixteen, Bank Top, Thatcher's Children
- University of St Andrews Library Special Collections, St Andrews: selected works from Fisherwomen and Return to Mingulay
