= Karsten Thormaehlen =

German photographer

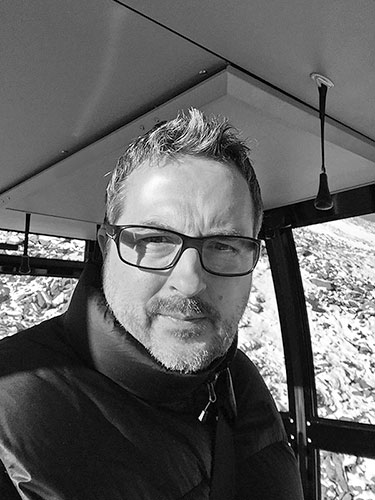
- Thormaehlen in Ötztal, Tyrol, Austria, 2015
- Born: Bad Kreuznach, Rhineland-Palatinate, West Germany
- Education: Fachhochschule Wiesbaden (now RheinMain University of Applied Sciences), 1988–1993, Wiesbaden, Germany
- Occupations: portrait photographer, still life photographer, Creative director
- Years active: 1985–present
- Known for: Portraits of Centenarians
- Style: Purism, beauty of aging, Documentary photography
- Spouse(s): Michaela Thormaehlen (2000–present)
- Website: www.karstenthormaehlen.com

Karsten Thormaehlen is a German photographer, editor and creative director. He lives and works in Wiesbaden, Germany.

== Early life and education ==
Thormaehlen grew up in Bad Kreuznach and Bingen am Rhein, Germany. After a commercial apprenticeship and civilian service he studied philosophy, art history, political science and graphic design in Mainz and Wiesbaden, where he graduated with honors in 1993.

== Photography ==
Thormaehlen's projects include portraying people over the age of 100 years and senior athletes. His work includes Jahrhundertmensch (2008), Happy at Hundred (2011), Aging Gracefully (2017) and Silver Heroes (2009). They have been published as books and exhibited. His work has received awards from the Art Directors Club, Tokyo Type Directors Club, Cannes Lions, Clio Awards, D&AD, New York Festivals, Lucie Awards,, Portrait of Humanity and Portrait of Britain. His works "Erika E., born in 1910", and "Susannah M. Jones, at age 116", were included in exhibitions at the National Portrait Gallery in London as part of the 2011 and 2016 Taylor Wessing Photographic Portrait Prizes. His work has been included in The Atlantic, Buzz Feed, The Guardian, Harvard Business Review, The Japan Times, Kinfolk, The New York Times,, Smithsonian Magazine. and Harvard Business Review.

His series Silver Heroes inspired the World Health Organization to launch its first global campaign against agism in 2012. In 2021, portraits from his series Aging Gracefully were displayed as part of the London Design Museum's exhibition New Old – Designing for our future selves at the Pratt Manhattan Gallery in New York City and his first solo exhibition Not Another Second was shown in 2021 and 2023 at the art galleries of The Watermark at Brooklyn Heights and The Watermark at Westwood Village.

Thormaehlen works as a commercial photographer, specialising in architecture, still life and portrait photography.

== Exhibitions ==
=== Solo exhibitions ===
- 2009: Karsten Thormaehlen: Silver Heroes, Frankfurt City Public Health Department, Frankfurt am Main, Germany
- 2010: Karsten Thormaehlen: Jahrhundertmensch, Zollamtsaal, Haus am Dom, Frankfurt am Main, Germany
- 2014: Karsten Thormaehlen: Pioniere der Zukunft, University of Zurich, Zurich-Schlieren, Switzerland
- 2014: Karsten Thormaehlen: Aktiv in die Zukunft, DOSB Deutscher Olympischer Sportbund, Dominikanerkloster, Frankfurt am Main, Germany
- 2015: Karsten Thormaehlen: Happy at Hundred, Toranomon Hills, Tokyo, Japan, 16–18 April 2015
- 2021: Karsten Thormaehlen: Not Another Second, The Watermark at Brooklyn Heights, Brooklyn, New York, January 2021
- 2023: Karsten Thormaehlen: Not Another Second, The Watermark at Westwood Village, Los Angeles, California, January 2023

=== Group exhibitions ===
- 2004: Im Rausch der Dinge, Fotomuseum Winterthur, Winterthur, Switzerland
- 2005: The Nature of Skin, Kunsthaus Hamburg, Barlach Halle K, Hamburg, Germany
- 2011: Taylor Wessing Photographic Portrait Prize, National Portrait Gallery, London
- 2016: Taylor Wessing Photographic Portrait Prize, National Portrait Gallery, London
- 2018: Pink is the New Grey, Weltkulturenmuseum, Frankfurt, Germany

== Publications ==
- Rome. Kempen, Germany: teNeues, 2004. ISBN 978-3-8238-4578-2.
- Jahrhundertmensch. Frankfurt am Main, 2008. ISBN 978-3-00-025096-5.
- Happy at Hundred. Heidelberg: Kehrer, 2011. ISBN 978-3-86-828243-6.
- Silver Heroes. Heidelberg: Kehrer, 2012. ISBN 978-3-86-828303-7.
- Aging Gracefully. San Francisco: Chronicle, 2017. ISBN 978-1-45-214533-4.
- Not Another Second – LGBT+ Seniors Share Their Stories, ed. by Ines Newby and June Hussey, Tucson, Arizona: Watermark Retirement Communities, 2021. ISBN 978-0-5788-0580-1.
- Young at Heart, ed. by Christine von Arnim, Göttingen, Germany: Steidl, 2022. ISBN 978-3-96999-029-2.
- 100 Jahre Lebensglück. Munich: Knesebeck, 2025. ISBN 978-3-95728-990-2.

== Awards ==
- 2013: Nominated, Deutscher Alterspreis
- 2015: Silver winner, Clio Awards, Public Service, Print category, for a photograph from his centenarians series used in advertising New Zealand Breast Cancer Foundation / Skinfoods
- 2016: Shortlisted, Taylor Wessing Photographic Portrait Prize, London, for a photograph from his centenarians series
- 2017: Bronze in Portraiture/Personality, Px3 Prix de la Photographie Paris, for a photograph from his centenarians series
- 2021: Shortlisted, Cannes Lions International Festival of Creativity, Health and Wellness category
