= Kalpesh =

- Gender: Male

Origin
- Meaning: Lord of Perfection
- Region of origin: India

Kalpesh is an Indian masculine given name.

The following are people called "Kalpesh":

- Kalpesh Lathigra, British photographer
- Kalpesh Parekh, Indian dubbing artist
- Kalpesh Patel, Kenyan cricketer
- Kalpesh Patel (Indian cricketer)
- Kalpesh Satyendra Jhaveri, Indian Judge
