= Open Eye Gallery =

Gallery and archive in Liverpool, UK

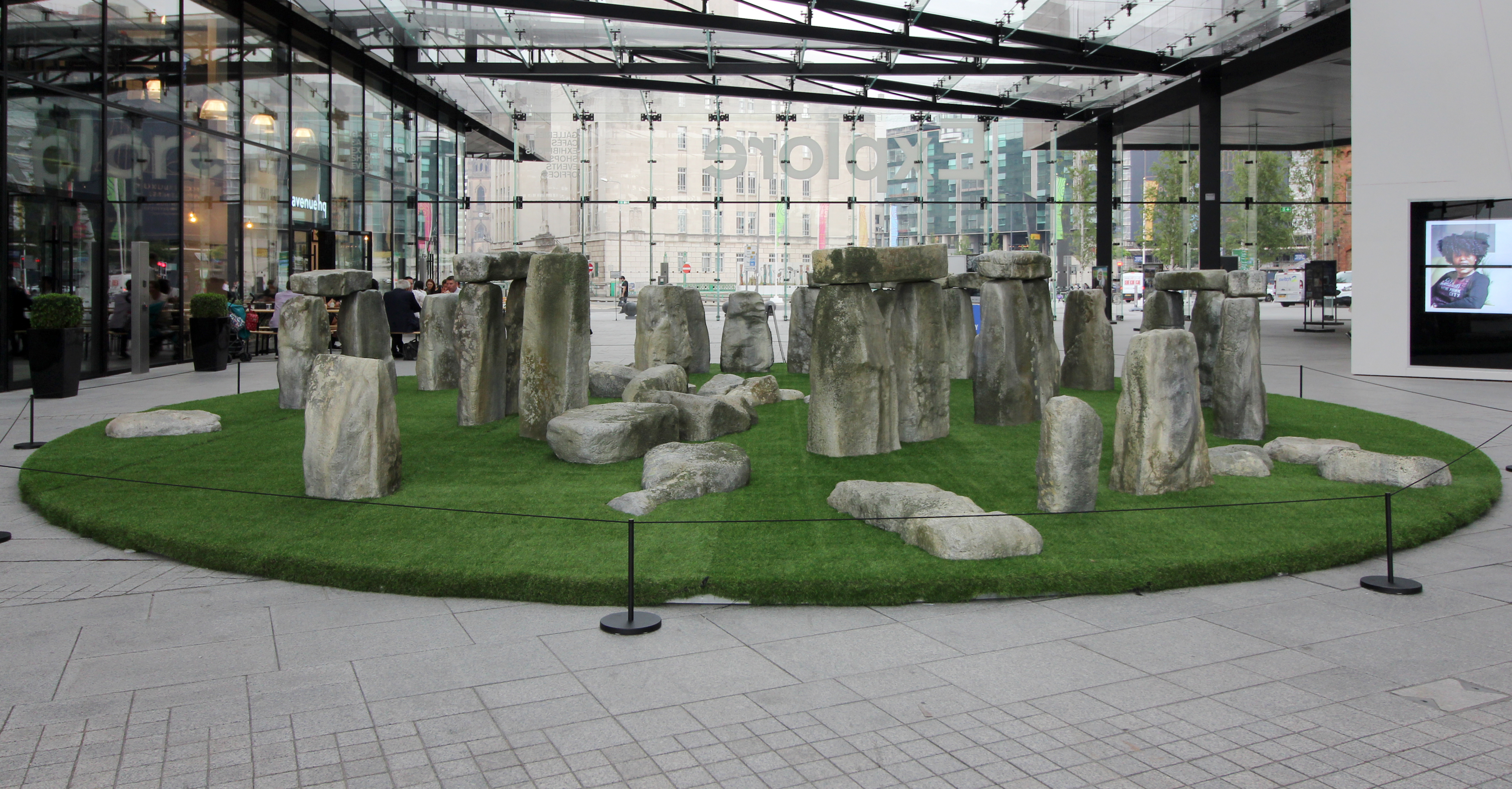
- Replica of Stonehenge in the foyer of the gallery, used as the scene of performance art during the summer of 2018
- Established: 1977
- Location: 19 Mann Island, Liverpool Waterfront, Liverpool L3 1BP
- Coordinates: 53.4037°N 2.9936°W
- Type: Registered charity
- Collections: Bert Hardy, Edith Tudor-Hart, Chris Steele-Perkins, Tom Wood
- Collection size: 1600 prints from 100 photographers
- Director: Sarah Fisher
- Architect: RCKa
- Website: openeye.org.uk

Open Eye Gallery is a photography gallery and archive in Liverpool, UK that was established in 1977. It is housed in a purpose-built building on the waterfront at Mann Island, its fourth location.

Open Eye Gallery comprises an exhibition space on one floor and an archive space on another, and has large-scale graphic art installations on its external facade. It is the only gallery dedicated to photography and related media in North West England. It is a non-profit organisation and a registered charity.

== History ==
Open Eye Gallery first opened in Whitechapel, Liverpool (1977–1988); then Bold Street (1989–1995); then Wood Street (1996–2011); and finally Mann Island (2011–present). Its current building was purpose-built.

Lorenzo Fusi was appointed its artistic director in 2013. Sarah Fisher replaced him as executive director in 2015.

== Notable photographers and exhibitions shown ==
- Toshio Iwai (1995)
- Jacob Aue Sobol (2006)
- Mitch Epstein (2011)
- Chris Steele-Perkins (2011)
- Martin Parr (2012)
- Tim Hetherington (2013)
- Alvin Baltrop (2013)
- Letizia Battaglia (2014)
- North: Identity, Photography, Fashion curated by Lou Stoppard and Adam Murray (2017) and travelled to Somerset House, London.
- Tom Wood (2018)
- Pixy Liao, Lydia Goldblatt, Johanna Heldebro, Jenny Lewis, Momo Okabe, Margaret Mitchell (2019) 'Kinship'
- Craig Easton: Is Anybody Listening? (2023)

== Open Eye Archive ==
Open Eye Gallery has a "considerable archive" of predominantly portraiture and documentary photography. "Formed in 1980, the Open Eye Archive is made up of the work of more than 100 photographers and comprises around 1600 prints."

Significant bodies of work are held by Bert Hardy (Chinese Hostel (1942) and Is There a British Colour Bar? (1949)), Edith Tudor-Hart, Tom Wood, Chris Steele-Perkins (The Pleasure Principle), Michelle Sank (The Water's Edge), and John McDonald.

Work is also held by John Davies, Gabriele Basilico, Vanley Burke, Bruce Gilden, E. Chambré Hardman, Peter Kennard, Mari Mahr, Peter Marlow, Joel Meyerowitz, Simon Norfolk, Martin Parr, Ewen Spencer, Ed van der Elsken, John Edwards), Ian Beesley, Steve Conlan, Philippe Conti, Will Curwen, Paul Fazackerley, Steve Hale, Sean Halligan, Thurston Hopkins, Greg Leach, Peter Hagerty, Harry Hammond, Derek Massey, Neil McDowall, Rob Meighen, Paul O'Donnell, Caroline Penn, Michael Robinson, Ludwig Schirmer, Samantha Seneviratne, Patrick Shanahan, John Stoddart, Wolfgang Suschitzky, Jan Svenungsson, Ali Taptik, Sandy Volz, Wojtek Wilczyk, Rob Williams, and David Reid.

== Publication ==
- The Water's Edge. By Michelle Sank and Joanne Lacey. Liverpool: Open Eye; Liverpool University, 2007. ISBN 978-1-84631-084-3. With a foreword by Patrick Henry, essays by Joanne Lacey, and a text by Roy Exley. Portraits by Sank of women who work, or worked, on the Liverpool waterfront. Published on the occasion of an exhibition.
