= Cian Oba-Smith =

Documentary and Fine-Art Photographer

Cian Oba-Smith (born 1992) is a fine-art / documentary photographer from London.

== Life and work ==
Oba-Smith was born and raised in Holloway, North London. He is of Nigerian and Irish descent. He studied photography at the University of the West of England, graduating in 2014.

Oba-Smith has made various projects throughout his career including A Quiet Prayer, a record of London in the first lockdown during the covid pandemic, Shanzhai, an exploration of the phenomena of copycat architecture in China, Concrete Horsemen, highlighting the forgotten contributions of African American horsemen in North Philadelphia, Andover & Six Acres, an interrogation of the negative stereotypes placed upon the estates in North London and Bikelife, a documentation of urban dirt-bike and wheelie culture in London.

Oba-Smith self-published his first book, Bikelife, in 2016. In 2019, his book Andover & Six Acres was published by Lost Light Recordings.

In 2019, he completed an artist residency at Light Work in Syracuse, NY, where he created a project on redlining and the links between historical segregation policy and contemporary communities.

Alongside his artistic practice, Oba-Smith works on commissions for various publications such as FT Weekend, The Face, M Magazine Le Monde, The Guardian, The Telegraph, Crack Magazine, Vice and others.

== Publications ==
=== Publications by Oba-Smith ===
- Bikelife. Self-Published, 2016
- Andover & Six Acres. Lost Light Recordings, 2019.

=== Group Publications ===
- Unseen London. Hoxton Mini Press, 2017. ISBN 978-1-910566-24-4
- Invisible Britain: Portraits of Hope and Resilience. Policy Press, 2018. ISBN 978-1-4473-4411-7
- There, There Issue One. theretherenow, 2019.
- Contact Sheet 207: Light Work Annual. Light Work, 2020. ISBN 978-1-945725-12-8

== Awards ==
- 2015: Winner, D&AD New Blood Award.
- 2016: Shortlist, Magnum & Photo London Graduate Award.
- 2017: Shortlist, D&AD Next Photographer Award.
- 2017: Shortlist, Magnum & Photo London Graduate Award.
- 2017: Winner, Feature Shoot Emerging Photography Award.
- 2017: Winner, I.P.F Photo Prize.
- 2017: Winner, Magenta Flash Forward.
- 2017: Selected, Taylor Wessing Photographic Portrait Prize.
- 2018: Selected, Portrait Salon.
- 2019: Selected, Lightwork Artist-In-Residence (AIR) Program.
- 2020: Shortlist, Foam Paul Huf Award.
- 2020: Selected, Portrait of Humanity.
- 2022: Winner, People’s Pick Award, Taylor Wessing Photographic Portrait Prize.
