= Margaret Mitchell (photographer) =

Scottish photographer

- Born: 1968 (age 57–58); Scotland
- Education: Edinburgh Napier University; Edinburgh College of Art
- Known for: Photography
- Awards: Sony World Photography Awards – 2nd place Professional Category, Contemporary Issues (2018); Royal Photographic Society IPE 160 – Gold Award Winner (2017); LensCulture Portrait Awards: Finalist Series (2017)
- Website: margaretmitchell.co.uk

Margaret Mitchell (born 1968) is a Scottish documentary photographer. Her work explores the relationship between individuals, place, and wider social structures, using photography to examine personal histories and the human condition. Mitchell often works with long-form series. She was awarded in the Sony World Photography Awards (2nd place Professional Category, Contemporary Issues) and her work is held in the collection of the National Galleries of Scotland. A book of her work, Passage, was published in 2021.

== Education and Early Career ==
Mitchell graduated from Edinburgh Napier University with a degree in Photography, Film and Television in 1994 and later completed a Masters in Photographic Practice from Edinburgh College of Art (2000). Mitchell worked as a photography lecturer for over 10 years and also led community-based projects.

== Work and Themes ==
Mitchell’s work often focuses on individuals and communities, exploring how lives unfold in relation to place, belonging, and personal history. In some series, she examines how social and economic conditions shape life trajectories. Central themes including childhood, belonging, and the influence of environment on personal experience. She has expressed concern that documentary photography can become overly reductive, warning against the use of stereotypes and sensationalism that may distort the complexity of people’s lives. Her projects often foreground psychological dimensions of place and aspects of the human condition. She has described herself as "pulled by the personal, the experiential in people's lives and that often includes issues-based work". Her work has been noted for its depth and resistance to simplistic or formulaic sociological interpretation.

Mitchell's early work includes Tiree Schoolchildren (1993) and Into The Village (1997). The latter made during a short residency in Poland supported by Edinburgh City Council and concentrating on brief encounters demonstrating Mitchell’s interest in observing ordinary moments. The Palais Social Club (1991) documented working life at a bingo hall in Edinburgh where Mitchell was employed as a student.

The series Family (1994), began as a student project about identity and stigma. It portrays Mitchell's sister Andrea's family and challenges stereotypes and assumptions. Over two decades later, Mitchell updated the work with In This Place (2015–2017), following the next generation. Mitchell reflects on both personal and political questions in a history covering class, opportunity and inequality. The project has been exhibited at awards, festivals, and galleries.. The Guardian highlighted Mitchell’s exploration of childhood, opportunity, and intergenerational inequality. In This Place was described by PhotoMonitor as balancing “vulnerability and strength” with a “sense of stasis, alternating between frustration and acceptance.” Zelda Cheatle observed that the work “speaks of this modern world we live in” with “sincerity and depth of emotion,” while curator Alasdair Foster wrote that it “speaks with quiet determination” and encourages viewers “not just to look, but to see and to care.”

Between 2019 and 2023, Mitchell produced An Ordinary Eden, a long-form documentary project centred on housing insecurity and the meaning of home. The project examines the experiences of people affected by homelessness. Rather than focusing solely on acute crisis, An Ordinary Eden considers long-term emotional and social consequences. Writing about the project, Aesthetica noted that Mitchell “condenses wide-ranging topics to the most intimate of settings”. The series title draws on the tattoo of one man and subverts the idea of ‘Eden’ as a paradise, instead suggesting a process of “reclaiming a semblance of normality and dignity.” The project reveals both institutional shortcomings and individual resilience and highlights the role of documentary photography in revealing experiences that are often overlooked. The series was exhibited in a solo exhibition at Street Level Photoworks in 2023 and accompanied by a collaborative publication, Stories on Finding Home, which raised funds for Shelter Scotland’s Hardship Fund. An artist-led project, Mitchell had involved individuals connected to Shelter Scotland’s Time for Change initiative. One of the resulting portraits was exhibited in the National Portrait Gallery’s Taylor Wessing Photographic Portrait Prize and in 2023, she donated work for permanent display in three Shelter Scotland offices. Writing on the series, critic Neil Cooper notes that Mitchell “doesn’t patronise or sensationalise,” adding that “the trust between Mitchell and her sitters is palpable.”

In her work, As the Day Closes (2021–2023), Mitchell documents emotional and social realities of dying. The project has been recognised for its intimate storytelling and its exploration of life’s fragility.. During a final visit, one man gave Mitchell a necklace with a pendant symbolising the tree of life, reflecting the deeply personal nature of the work. The work has been described as a poignant reminder of an individual’s emotional journey at the end of life, as well as systemic challenges.

Other projects include The Guisers which looks at the psychological and cultural aspects of children at Halloween in Scotland, The Youth House, which documents young people in a Glasgow community and a grassroots effort to support them and The Eastern Wood which portrays rural youth in the Netherlands at the edge of adolescence and aspiration.

== Practice and Public Engagement ==
Mitchell’s photographic practice is recognised for its ethical grounding, with a sustained emphasis on responsible engagement. She has given talks and presentations at venues including the National Galleries of Scotland, the Royal Photographic Society, Street Level Photoworks and the Martin Parr Foundation. In 2023, she spoke at Enter the Archive, an event held by the National Galleries of Scotland in partnership with Fast Forward: Women in Photography on ethical responsibilities of documentary photographers and the importance of context when work enters public or archival collections. In 2023, a public event at Street Level Photoworks, held in connection with Mitchell's exhibition An Ordinary Eden and involving Shelter Scotland, explored themes of representation, ethics, and lived experience.,

== Exhibitions ==
Mitchell's work has been exhibited nationally and internationally, across festivals, group shows, and solo exhibitions. Highlights include the Taylor Wessing Photographic Portrait Prize at the National Portrait Gallery, London (2014 and 2022); the Royal Photographic Society's IPE 160 (2017), her solo show An Ordinary Eden at Street Level Photoworks, Glasgow (2023) and Conversations with the Collection at the Gallery of Modern Art, Edinburgh (2023). In 2024, she exhibited in Margaret Mitchell: Six Works at the Pathfoot Gallery, University of Stirling, and in UK Women: Photography between Social Criticism and Identity at the Ludwiggalerie Schloss. Other notable appearances include exhibitions at the Scottish National Portrait Gallery, Open Eye Gallery (Liverpool), FORMAT International Photography Festival (Derby), Festival Circulation(s) (Paris) and DOCfield Barcelona. Her work has also been shown at the Getty Images Gallery (London), Whitebox Gallery (Kuala Lumpur), and in projects such as '209 Women' at Portcullis House and Open Eye Gallery.

== Publications ==
- Passage. Liverpool: Bluecoat, 2021. ISBN 9781908457622. With a foreword by Alasdair Foster. Includes the series Family and In This Place.

== Awards ==
- 2017 LensCulture Portrait Awards: Finalist Series
- 2017 Kuala Lumpur International Photoawards – Winner 2nd place
- 2017 Renaissance Photography Prize – Finalist Series
- 2017 Royal Photographic Society IPE 160 – Gold Award Winner
- 2018 Sony World Photography Awards – 2nd place Professional Category, Contemporary Issues
- 2018 Slideluck Editorial Leica Award with Leica Fotografie International
