= Kalpesh Patel =

Kalpesh Patel may refer to:

- Kalpesh Patel (Kenyan cricketer)
- Kalpesh Patel (Indian cricketer)
