= Craig Easton =

Craig Easton may refer to:

- Craig Easton (footballer)
- Craig Easton (photographer)
