= Martina Holmberg =

Swedish photographer

Martina Holmberg is a Swedish photographer. In 2025, her series The Outside of the Inside, documenting people with facial and physical differences, won both the Prix de la Photographie, Paris Gold in Portraiture/Other award, and the Taylor Wessing Photographic Portrait Prize.

== Life and work ==
Holmberg lives in Stockholm. Her work portrays people's living conditions around the world, often those of women. The series The Outside of the Inside, documents people with facial and physical differences. A portrait from this series, of a woman who survived a car fire, won the Taylor Wessing Photographic Portrait Prize.

== Publications ==
- In a WoMAN's world. Stockholm: Verbal förlag, 2021. With Maria Hagström. ISBN 978-91-89155-51-0. Photography. Edition of 800 copies.
- Det bor en fågel i mitt öra. Lund, Sweden: Ekström & Garay, 2022. Poetry. Edition of 100 copies.
- Qaanaaq – Röster från en by. Stockholm: Verbal, 2022. Photography. Edition of 600 copies.

== Awards ==
- Gold in Portraiture/Other, Px3, Paris, 2025, for the series The Outside of the Inside
- Winner, Taylor Wessing Photographic Portrait Prize, London, 2025, for a photograph from the series The Outside of the Inside. A £15000 prize.
