= Michael Runkel =

German travel photographer

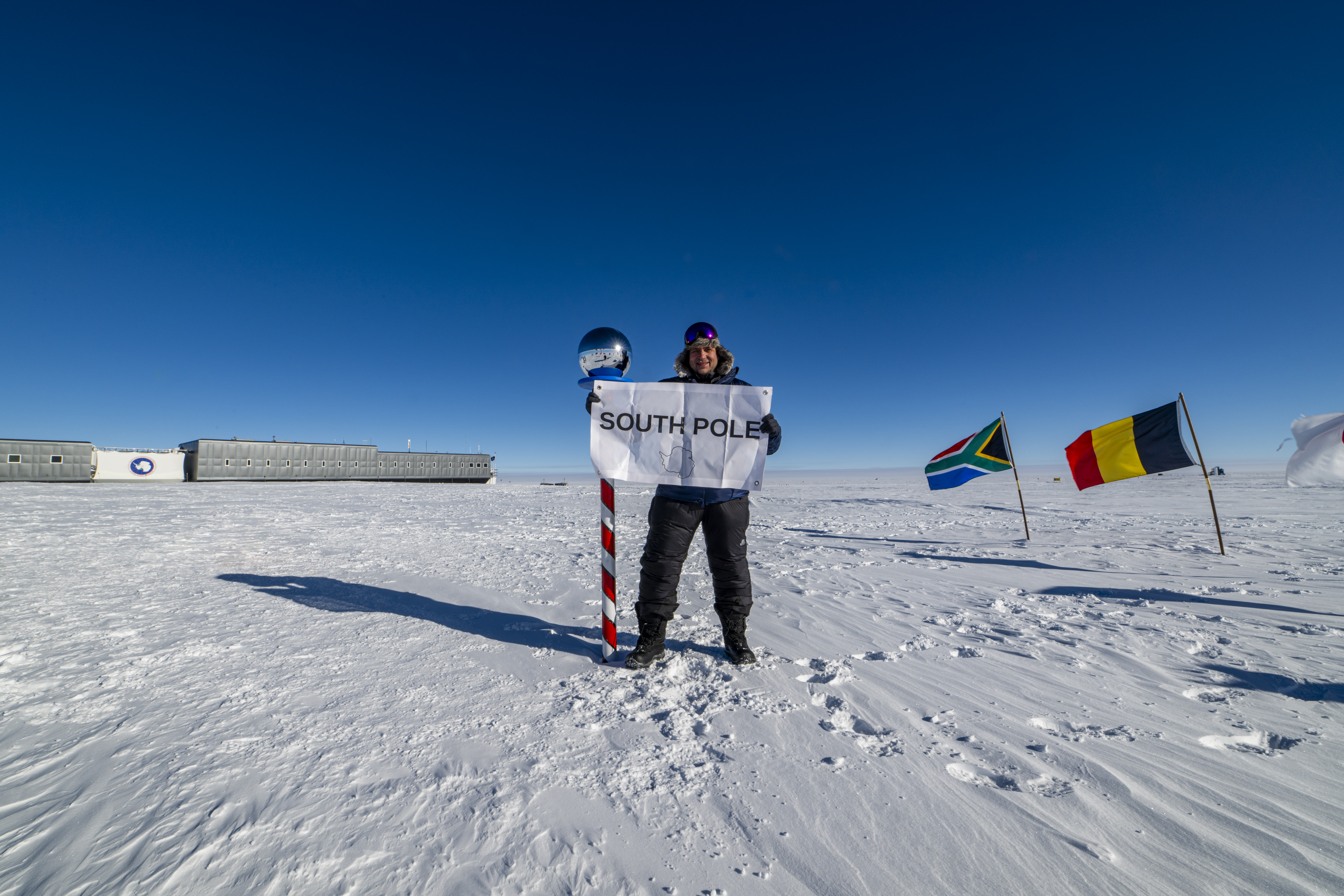
Michael Runkel on the South Pole in December 2023

Michael Runkel (born 20 May 1969 in Neustadt an der Aisch) is a German travel photographer, author, speaker and traveler who has visited all 193 member states of the United Nations and has twice been nominated for the Travel Photographer of the Year.

== Career ==
Runkel was born in Neustadt an der Aisch, Bavaria, and earned a master's degree in economics and sports science after studying at Friedrich Alexander University in Erlangen-Nuremberg. In 2003, he added a master's degree in geography. He lives in Nuremberg. He is married to former pop singer Samantha Stollenwerck and has two children.

== Travel ==
In 1988, Michael Runkel embarked on his first trip outside Europe with Interrail to Morocco, and since then, he says his travels around the world have taken him to all 193 UN countries. Christmas 2003 Michael Runkel survived the earthquake of Bam / Iran with tens of thousands of victims. He and a friend rescued ten other tourists and locals from the rubble of the collapsed building and were awarded the Gold Medal on the red ribbon for services to the Republic of Austria. The rescue story was the cover story of Reader's Digest worldwide. Impressed by the devastation and the experiences, Michael Runkel launched a relief project over the next five years that ended with the construction of a school (together with the Rudolf Walther Foundation), the reconstruction of the hotel where he stayed, and a project to educate widows who received no help from the local government (together with Arche Nova). His efforts were documented in the ARTE documentary.

In 2018, Michael Runkel visited Saudi Arabia as his last country, so he has now traveled to all countries. In the same year, he traveled to the North Pole on the nuclear-powered Russian icebreaker 50 Let Pobedy.

Out of the 1301 regions of the world Runkel has travelled to 1250 of them, making him the second most travelled person in the world. Runkel takes the number 1 spot on mosttravelledpeople.travel.

Michael Runkel has appeared on television and radio programs. He has been featured, quoted or written about in dozens of publications, e.g. BBC, Fox News, Der Spiegel, Bild, Süddeutsche Zeitung and Reader's Digest.

== Photographer ==
His work as a photographer began in 1993 when, during the aftermath of the Khmer Rouge guerrilla movement, he met two New Zealand travel photographers who introduced him to the field of travel photography.

Over the years, he photographed for many tour operators. His images have appeared in guidebooks, newspapers, magazines, and various multimedia media, including The New York Times, National Geographic, GEO, Condé Nast Traveler and Lonely Planet.

A major focus of his work is UNESCO World Heritage Sites, which showcase the beauty and heritage of planet Earth. To date, he has photographed nearly 880 of 1157.

In 2018, Michael Runkel was included in the list of top travel photographers in the world by Photoshelter. In the same year, his pictures were exhibited in the Museum of Industrial Culture in Nuremberg with 15,000 visitors.

His first book, My Travels to the Ends of the World, contains images and stories from his journeys to remote corners of the world.

He also did the book design for his second book, a coffee table book entitled South Pacific.

In 2021 and 2022, Michael Runkel received a recommendation in the Travel Photographer of the Year award.

== Speaker ==
Michael Runkel has been invited to speak on photography, travel tips and about his travel experiences. In 2023, he appeared as a keynote speaker at the African Travel Content Creator Conference in Lagos, Nigeria, and at the MTP Travel Summit in Ciudad de la Paz in Equatorial Guinea.
