= Marsel van Oosten =

Dutch photographer

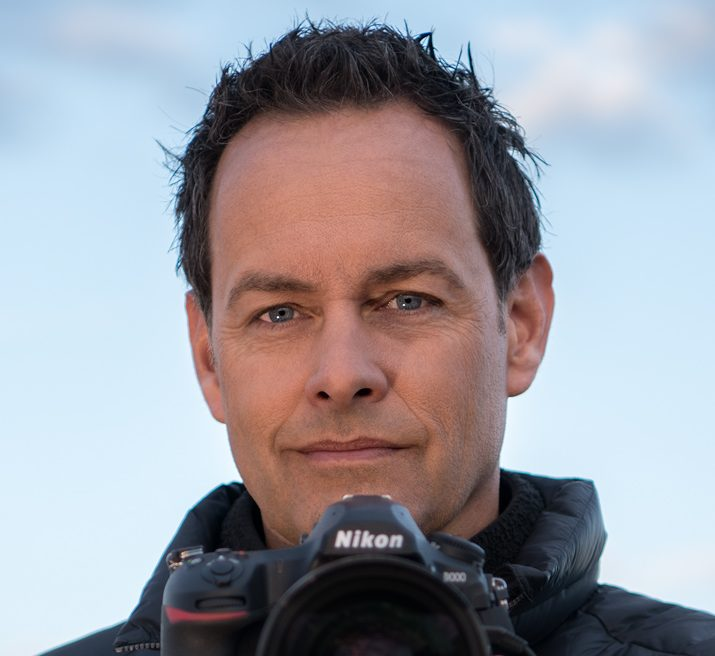
- Born: Rotterdam, Netherlands
- Occupation: Photographer
- Website: squiver.com

Marsel van Oosten is a Dutch photographer specialising in nature and wildlife photography. He has been overall winner of the Wildlife Photographer of the Year and Travel Photographer of the Year competitions.

== Publications ==
- Wild Romance: Africa's most romantic safari lodges. Cape Town: Struik Lifestyle, 2009. By van Oosten and Daniëlla Sibbing. ISBN 9781770077263.
- Mother: A Tribute to Mother Earth. Kempen, Germany: teNeues, 2021. ISBN 978-3961713349.

== Awards ==
- 2005: 1st Prize, International Photography Awards (IPA)
- 2006: 1st Prize, International Photography Awards
- 2008: 1st Prize, International Photography Awards
- 2009: 3rd Prize, International Photography Awards
- 2015: Overall winner, Travel Photographer of the Year
- 2018: Grand title winner, Wildlife Photographer of the Year
