= Nydia Blas =

American photographer

Nydia Blas (born 1981) is an American photographer from the state of New York, whose works explore the identity of young Black women and girls. Her concern at the lack of Black women represented in the visual arts has led her to concentrate solely on making images of women of color. She is currently an assistant professor at Spelman College in Atlanta, Georgia, where she teaches photography in the department of art and visual culture.

== Early life and education ==
Nydia Blas was born in October 1981, and grew up in Ithaca, New York. Blas received her bachelor's degree from Ithaca College in cinema and photography with a minor in African diaspora studies. She received her Master of Fine Arts in photography from Syracuse University.

== Photography ==
Blas began making photographs as a teenager. At first, she was interested in photography as a process, particularly trying and failing until the desired product is achieved. She then became intrigued with photography as a means to influence public opinion, citing the use of photographs by the anti-lynching movement to turn the public against lynching.

Nydia explores sexuality, intimacy, and her lived experience as a child, adult, and mother through photography, collage, film, and books. She uses her art to construct a physical and allegorical space framed through a Black feminine eye, weaving stories about situation, meaning, and influence. Blas's photographs explore Black identity, particularly young Black women and girls. Blas stated that she draws inspiration from Audre Lorde's concept of "the erotic", which includes not just sexuality but also intimacy among family members and friends. One of her photo series is entitled The Girls Who Spun Gold. The name of the photo series comes from a Virginia Hamilton book The Girl Who Spun Gold, which is an African-American interpretation of the classic fairytale "Rumpelstiltskin". Priscilla Frank of HuffPost called the series "a celebration of girls in all their sloppiness, softness and strength".

Most of the subjects of Blas's photographs are Black women. In a 2016 interview, Blas noted the lack of Black women represented in visual arts, stating "This is why I have I chosen to currently make images of only women of color." Blas believes that her work challenges the notion of Black women as "hypersexual beings", saying that the stereotype was created "to reinforce very old stereotypes that were created to justify the mistreatment and exploitation of black women during slavery". The subjects of her photographs instead express sexuality on their own terms, reclaiming "their identities and their bodies".

Blas's work has been displayed at The Wing in New York City and Washington, D.C.; her work was also included in an exhibition called Vigilance, Struggle, Pride: Through Her Eyes that traveled through Europe. In 2016, Blas was a visual artist-in-residence at the Center for Photography at Woodstock. In 2018, her photo series Whatever You Like was displayed at the Garey Gallery. Also in 2018, she was one of three recipients of a Light Work grant.

Some of her photographs were included in the book Mfon: Women Photographers of the African Diaspora, "an anthology featuring the work of more than 100 female photographers of African descent from around the world". One of the authors of the book, Adama Delphine Fawundu, referred to Blas's work as "striking", saying:

It's really looking at what it's like to be in this body. And the social implications and expectations of being in this body but then creating this magical world that empowers them. These girls are magical in their own way.

== Community organizer ==
In January 2017, Blas was named as the acting executive director of the Southside Community Center. As of 2018, she was one of the two leaders of the Center, the other being Nia Nunn. Blas and Nunn created an outreach campaign they named "Black Girl Alchemists", which they targeted at young Black women in Ithaca, New York. The campaign encouraged these women to express themselves through literature and art to combat internalized racism and sexism. They won a US$270,000 grant in 2016 to continue their efforts centered on Black cultural identity.

While working at the Southside Community Center, Blas founded the Girl Empowerment Group. Blas acted as a mentor to the girls in the group, encouraging them to keep diaries, teaching them about self esteem, and organizing events for other teenagers in the Black community. Members of the Girl Empowerment Group later became the subjects of her photo series The Girls Who Spun Gold. Through her photographs of the young women, Blas hopes that her subjects can reclaim their identities and their bodies, stating: "I wanted my subjects to reclaim, explore, and protect their bodies and sexuality, and to reveal the magic that happens between women and self. I would like this work to state that black and brown females have a right to pleasure and a right to fantasy."

== Personal life ==
Blas had her first child when she was 18 years old. As of 2021, she has two children.(Naseem), (Rosario). She stated that her experience as a mother "runs through all of my work".
