= Joni Sternbach =

American photographer

Joni Sternbach (born 1953) is an American photographer whose large-format camera images employ early photographic processes, including tintype and collodion. Using an 8×10 Deardorff large format camera, Sternbach focuses on in situ portraits of surfers. Sternbach's photographs are particularly notable for highlighting women surfers and surf culture, and for her ethnographic rather than action approach.

== Early life ==
Sternbach was born in the Bronx, New York in 1953. She received her M.A. in photography from the International Center for Photography at NYU in 1987. She has also taught photography at New York University and the International Center of Photography and Cooper Union.

== Work ==
In a National Geographic profile, Sternbach describes her relation to using early photographic processes as deploying a medium in need of an appropriate subject matter, one that she gradually found surfers to fulfill quite by accident: "Once I understood the limitations of the process, I realized that it was more of a question of finding a subject matter to suit the medium, not the other way around." Indeed, Sternbach is regarded as a master and pioneer of the 20th-21st-century revival of early analog processes.

Photographs in Sternbach's 2009 book Surfland are described by The New York Times as "a kind of ethnographic study in stillness, silvery portraits of a tribe united by a sense of adventure, the love of a sport and a connection to the ocean." Sternbach's "16.02.20 #1 Thea+Maxwell" from the series Surfland was awarded second place in the 2016 Taylor Wessing Photographic Portrait Prize. Sternbach has been recognized for her work as a female surf photographer.

== Collections ==
- National Portrait Gallery, London
- Maison Européenne de la Photographie, Paris, France
- Museum of Fine Arts, Texas
- Nelson-Atkins Museum of Art, Kansas City, Missouri
- Peabody Essex Museum, Salem, Massachusetts.
- LA County Museum of Art, Los Angeles, California

== Books ==
- Surfland (2009), Photolucida
- Surf Site Tin Type (2014), Damiani Editore
- Surfboard (2020), self published
- Kissing a Stranger (2021), Dürer Editions
