= Alys Tomlinson =

British photographer

Alys Tomlinson (born 1975) is a British photographer. She has published the books Following Broadway (2013), Ex-Voto (2019), Lost Summer (2020) and Gli Isolani (The Islanders) (2022). For Ex-Voto she won the Photographer of the Year award at the 2018 Sony World Photography Awards. Portraits from Lost Summer won First prize in the 2020 Taylor Wessing Photographic Portrait Prize.

== Life and work ==
Tomlinson was born and grew up in Brighton, UK. She studied English, literature and communications at the University of Leeds. After graduating in the mid-1990s, she moved to New York City for a year, where she undertook her first commission as a photographer, shooting all the pictures for the Time Out Guide to the city. She returned to London to study photography at Central Saint Martins College of Art and Design and later completed a part-time MA in anthropology of travel, tourism and pilgrimage at SOAS University of London.

During each of several later trips to New York City over four years, she walked the 14 mile length of Broadway, first in full taking 10 hours then in sections, and making street portraits. This resulted in the book Following Broadway (2013).

Tomlinson's book Ex-Voto (2019) is about ex-voto (votive offerings made to a saint or to a divinity) left at several European destinations of Christian pilgrimage: the Sanctuary of Our Lady of Lourdes, France; Ballyvourney, Ireland; and the Grabarka Holy Mount in Podlaskie Voivodeship, Poland, close to the border with Belarus. The Sanctuary at Lourdes surrounds the Catholic shrine to Our Lady of Lourdes (a Roman Catholic title of the Blessed Virgin Mary) who is venerated there in honour of the Lourdes apparitions of 1858. Writing in The Guardian, Sean O'Hagan included an exhibition of Ex-Voto at Rencontres d'Arles at number 6 in his "Top 10 photography shows of 2019"; and the book at number 3 in his "Top 15 photography books of 2019", about which he wrote:

"Ex-Voto gathers her stark monochrome portraits of pilgrims, large format landscapes and mysterious still lifes of offerings left in rocks and trees at Lourdes, Ballyvourney and Grabarka. The results possess a kind of serene calmness that befits the subject matter, her portraits in particular capturing the reverent otherness and simplicity of the devotional life."

Tomlinson's film Vera, which accompanies her Ex-Voto work, is a "short film about a young nun, Vera, who works with wild horses in a convent in Belarus".

Lost Summer (2020) is a book of black and white portraits of young people aged between 15 and 19 in north London. With the cancellation of final exams and ritual events such as proms and graduations due to the COVID-19 pandemic, Tomlinson photographed her subjects in the outfits they would have worn to prom, in their gardens and local parks.

As well as personal projects, Tomlinson works commercially for editorial, design and advertising clients.

== Publications ==
=== Books of work by Tomlinson ===
- Following Broadway. London: self-published / Eyebox, 2013. ISBN 978-0992728007. Edition of 250 copies.
- Ex-Voto. London: Gost, 2019. ISBN 978-1-910401-27-9. With essays by Rowan Cerys Tomlinson, John Eade and Sean O'Hagan.
- Lost Summer. Self-published, 2020.
- Gli Isolani (The Islanders). Gost, 2022. ISBN 978-1-910401-76-7. With an essay by Sabrina Mandanici.

=== Publications with contributions by Tomlinson ===
- New York. Time Out Guide. Written by Shawn Dahl et al, photography by Tomlinson. London: Penguin, 1999. Seventh edition. ISBN 978-0140274523.

== Short films ==
- Mother Vera (2019)

== Exhibitions ==
=== Solo exhibitions ===
- Ex-Voto, Chichester Cathedral, 2019; Side Gallery, Amber Film & Photography Collective, Newcastle upon Tyne, 2019

=== Group exhibitions ===
- Taylor Wessing Photographic Portrait Prize, National Portrait Gallery, London, 2017
- Sony World Photography Awards, Somerset House, London, 2018
- The Faithful, Rencontres d'Arles, Arles, France, 2019. Part of the New Discovery Award. Included Tomlinson's Ex-Voto photography series and short film Vera.
- Lost Summer with Bindi Vora's Mountain of Salt, Charing Cross Hospital, London, 2021

== Awards ==
- 2018: Photographer of the Year (overall winner), Sony World Photography Awards, London. A prize of $25,000 USD.
- 2018: 1st Place, Discovery Category, Sony World Photography Awards, London
- 2019: Audience Award: 2019 Louis Roederer Discovery Award, Rencontres d'Arles, Arles, France
- 2020: First prize, Taylor Wessing Photographic Portrait Prize, London, for portraits of Samuel, Jack and Jameela from the series Lost Summer. A prize of £15000.
