= Pat Martin (photographer) =

Pat Martin is an American photographer, based in Los Angeles. In 2019 he won the Taylor Wessing Photographic Portrait Prize for portraits of his mother.

== Life and work ==
Martin grew up in Mar Vista near Venice Beach, West Los Angeles, California.

His mother struggled with addiction throughout Martin's life. Knowing that she did not have long to live, from 2016 to 2018 he used portraiture to reconnect with her before her death. That series, titled Goldie (Mother), was described by Sean O'Hagan in The Observer as "searingly honest portraits that, even without the narrative behind them, have an emotional heft rare in contemporary photography." Since 2016 Martin's photography has also been of other family members.

== Awards ==
- 2019: First prize (£15,000), Taylor Wessing Photographic Portrait Prize, National Portrait Gallery, London for 2 photographs from Goldie (Mother)

== Group exhibitions ==
- Taylor Wessing Photographic Portrait Prize, National Portrait Gallery, London, 2019
