= Abbie Trayler-Smith =

British documentary photographer (born 1977)

- Born: 1977 (age 48–49); Wales, United Kingdom
- Education: Self-taught
- Known for: Photography
- Notable work: Chelsea 2010

Abbie Trayler-Smith (born 1977) is a Welsh documentary and portrait photographer who contributed to The Daily Telegraph for eight years from 1998, covering the war in Iraq and the Asian tsunami. In 2010, with her portrait Chelsea, she won fourth prize in the Taylor Wessing competition, and second prize in 2017 for Fleeing Mosul.

== Life and career ==
Abbie Trayler-Smith was born in Wales. She is self-taught, specializing in documentary and portrait photography. She worked for The Daily Telegraph for eight years. She has been working as a freelance artist since 2007.

== Awards ==
- 2010: Fourth prize, Taylor Wessing competition, for Chelsea
- 2017: Second prize, Taylor Wessing Photographic Portrait Prize, for Fleeing Mosul

== Personal life ==
Trayler-Smith lives in London, England.

== Publications ==
- Rise: Images of Life Change. Edited by John Levy. Dubai: Legatum Foundation; Foto8, 2010. ISBN 978-0-9559580-4-5. With text by Max Houghton and photographs by Carmen Elsa Lopez, William Daniels, Robin Hammond, Trayler-Smith, Venetia Dearden, Sanjit Das, Atul Loke, and Kate Shortt.
- Common Ground. Document Scotland, 2014. Includes work by each Document Scotland member as well as by members of Welsh photography collective A Fine Beginning, including Trayler-Smith. With essays by Malcolm Dickson and Anne McNeill. Published to accompany an exhibition at Street Level Photoworks, Glasgow.
