= Jon Levy (photographer) =

British photojournalist

Jon Levy (born 1967) is a British photojournalist. He was the founder and director of Foto8. Foto8 was a British-based photography company responsible for the publication of 8 Magazine, the Biannual of Photography, as well as its sister website Foto8.com and the Host gallery in London.

== Biography ==
Levy was born in London in 1967. He studied Economics at Manchester University from 1985 to 1988. He then attended the International Center of Photography in New York City. completing the one-year certificate program in Documentary Photography and photojournalism.

Following graduation, Levy became a freelance news photographer in New York City. He worked frequently for The Independent in London along with their U.S. correspondent Daniel Jeffreys. Levy also freelanced for the photo agency Gamma Liaison under editor Marion Mertens. Later Levy joined the French wire service Agence France Presse in the New York Bureau working, with photographers Don Emmert and Timothy Clary.

In 1998 Levy returned to London and soon started Foto8. Levy and Gordon Miller also launched 8 Magazine (known previously as ei8ht), a quarterly publication of photojournalism. The issues of the 8 Magazine were very much like the website on which it was based. The magazine published new works by independent photographers covering current affairs and personal photo stories. The photo editor Lauren Heinz and text editor Max Houghton were in charge of the magazine editorial content.

In 2006 Levy moved Foto8 to new premises in Honduras Street, in East London. He also founded Host Gallery there to further explore the publishing, exhibition and presentation of photographic projects. Host maintained a program of shows, talks, screenings and other events, including the annual street party launch of the Foto8 Summer Show.

In 2009 Foto8 released its first book: Maurice Broomfield, Photographs, examining Maurice Broomfield's archive of industrial photography from the 1950s. That same year, Levy served as a guest curator at the annual New York Photo Festival with the Home for Good exhibition.

In 2010, Levy completed Rise, a six-month, eight-photographer commission and book for the Legatum Foundation, and Taking Land, a book with Alban Kakulya for the Zoï Environment Network.

In November 2012, Foto8 and Host Gallery ceased trading.

Levy speaks at events about the role of photojournalism in society and the future of it as a tool of social communication.

== Publication edited by Levy ==
- Rise: Images of Life Change. Edited by Levy. Dubai: The Legatum Foundation; Foto8, 2010. ISBN 978-0-9559580-4-5. With text by Max Houghton and photographs by Carmen Elsa Lopez, William Daniels, Robin Hammond, Abbie Trayler-Smith, Venetia Dearden, Sanjit Das, Atul Loke, and Kate Shortt.
