= Samantha Stollenwerck =

American singer-songwriter (born 1978)

Background information
- Born: September 8, 1978 (age 47); Los Angeles, California, United States
- Origin: Berkeley, California, United States
- Genres: Pop, rock, folk, world
- Occupations: Singer-songwriter, guitarist
- Instruments: Singing, guitar
- Years active: 1999–present
- Labels: In The Pocket Records, Dusty Peach Records
- Spouse: Michael Runkel
- Website: www.samanthamusic.com/

Samantha Stollenwerck (born September 8, 1978) is an American singer-songwriter. She has released four full-length albums and a four-track EP.

== Biography ==
Stollenwerck's debut album, Square One, was self-produced and released in 2005 on San Francisco's in the Pocket Records.

Stollenwerck's second album Carefree was produced by Jeff Trott, and released on November 10, 2009, on indie label Dusty Peach Records. She collaborated with songwriter Danielle Brisebois. Her third album was Lights Down & Unreleased.

Her fourth album, Traveler's Songbook, was recorded after traveling through more than 30 countries, and the songs and music videos incorporated influences from Germany, Eritrea, Russia, the Arctic and Antarctic Regions, Uganda, Rwanda and Yemen. One of the influences of this project was Paul Simon's Graceland. The album was released on November 25, 2014.

Stollenwerck has used her music to raise funds to build a school in Laos with Pencils of Promise. She collaborated with G. Love on the song "Ooh Dee Ooh" as part of the Patagonia Music Collective and helped build a community center and music program with SYRV, a clean water initiative in Nicaragua.

Stollenwerck and Mark Foster of Foster the People recorded a never-released version of Joni Mitchell's "California" for a statewide tourism campaign. She co-wrote and was featured on Right the Stars song "Don't Let Me Go to Sleep", from their 2014 album The Only Thing.

=== Touring ===
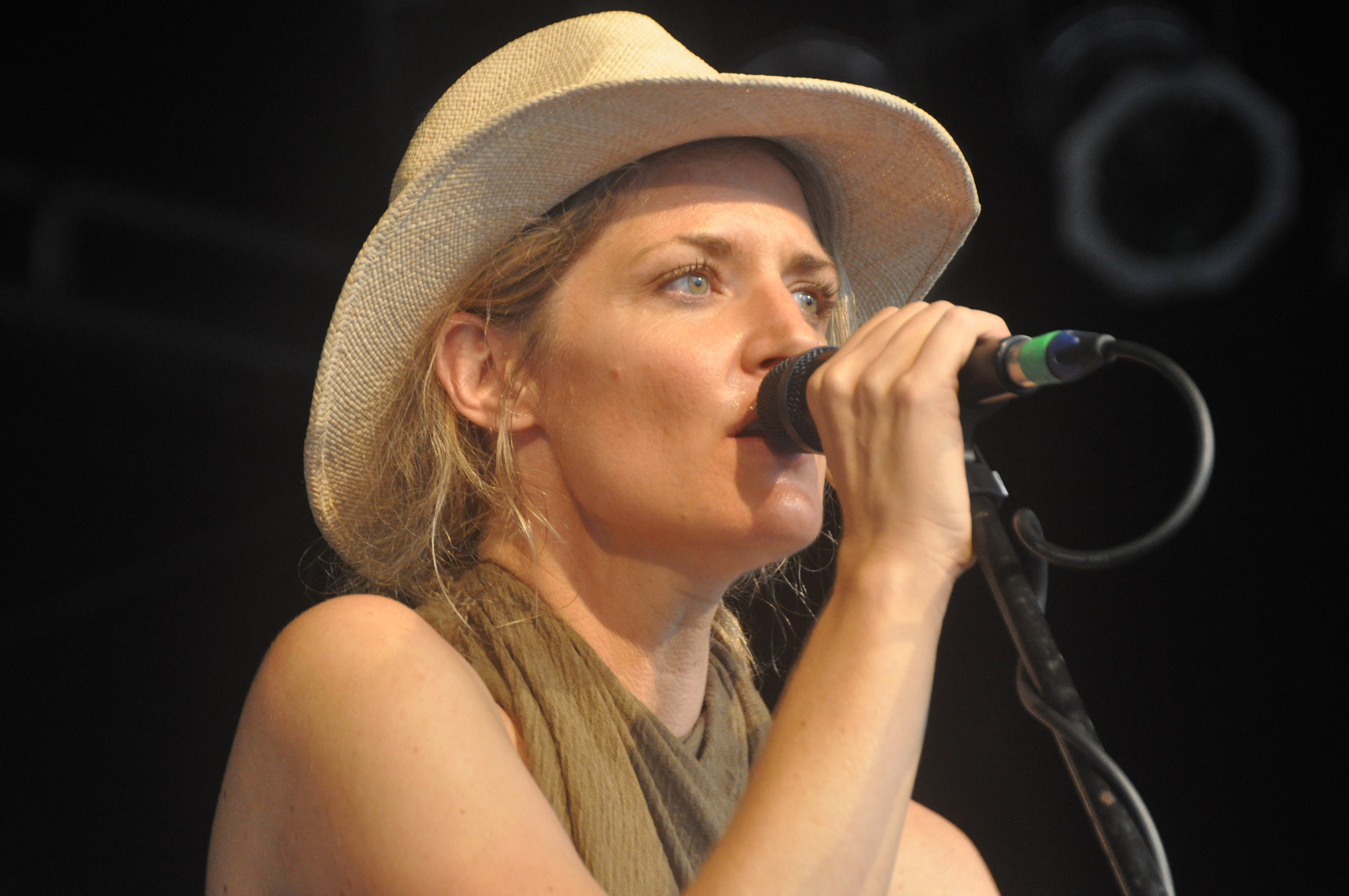
Samantha Stollenwerck at the 2014 Nuremberg Bardentreffen festival

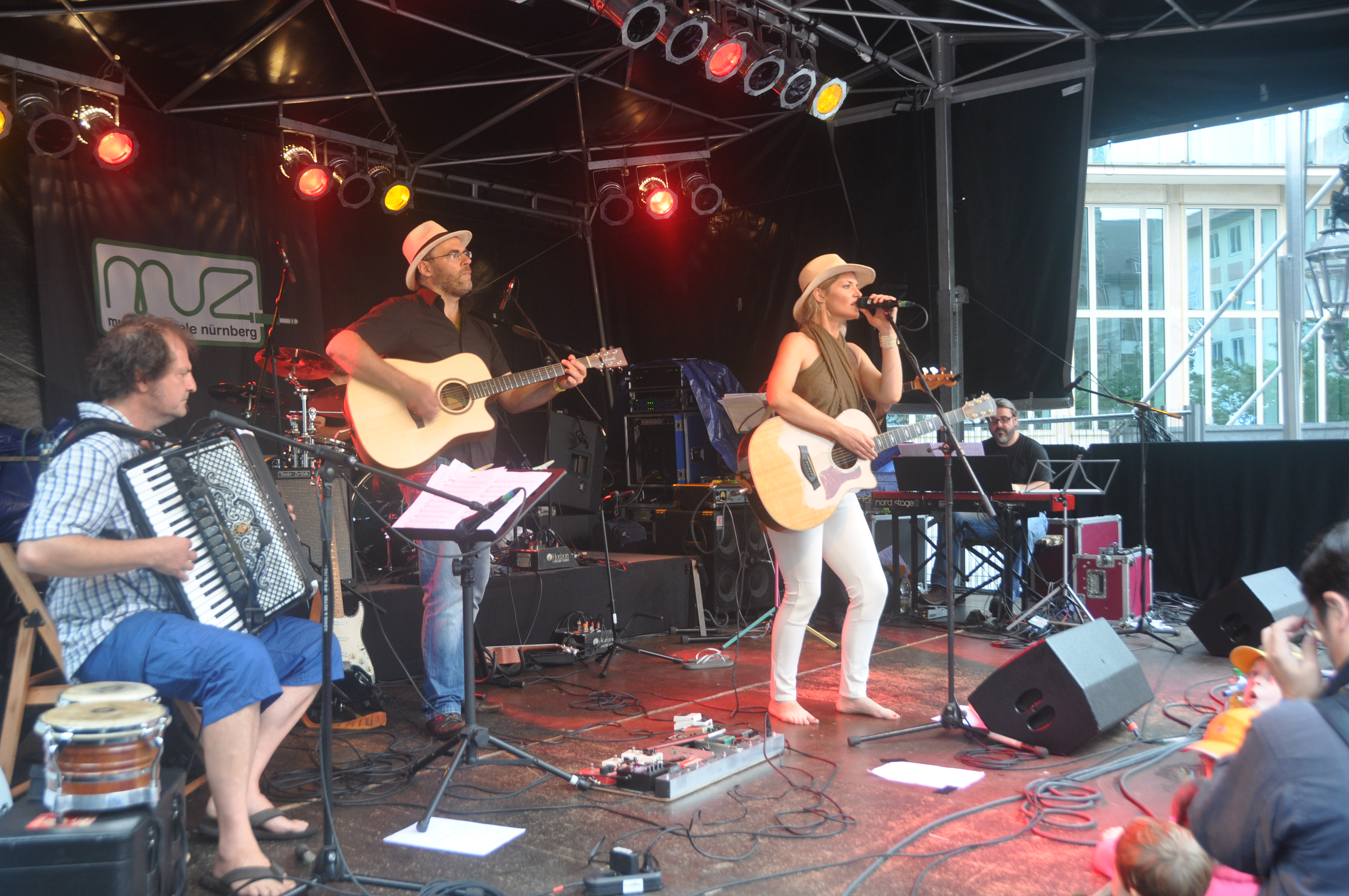
Samantha Stollenwerck with her band 2014 at the Bardentreffen festival

Stollenwerck received support in San Francisco from KFOG radio, and played at venues such as The Fillmore and Shoreline Amphitheatre. Stollenwerck has played festivals including Bonnaroo Music Festival, South by Southwest and Austin City Limits, and High Sierra Music Festival as well as tours with Ziggy Marley, G. Love and Special Sauce and Blues Traveler. In 2011 she performed at Super Bowl XLV in Dallas, Texas.

== Discography ==
Album	Tracks
Square One: Released: February 22, 2005; Label: In The Pocket Records; ASIN: B0007IO6VO	1. "Missed The Sunset"; 2. "Don't Ya Know"; 3. "Frank Sinatra"; 4. "Aesop's Fables"; 5. "Icicles"; 6. "Her Style(Diamonds)"; 7. "Anything For That"; 8. "The Party Life"; 9. "Thousands of Ways"; 10. "Happily Married Man"; 11. "Square One"
SummerLove EP: Released: May 20, 2006; Label: Red Light Management	1. "Summer Love"; 2. "Trouble"; 3. "Fetish"; 4. "Little More Love"
Carefree: Releasing: November 10, 2009; Label: Dusty Peach Records; ASIN: B002TMOGE8	1. "Oblivious"; 2. "Japanese Single"; 3. "Carefree"; 4. "One of Your Tattoos"; 5. "Write His Name in The Sky"; 6. "Is This My Life"; 7. "Icicles (Acoustic)"; 8. "Trouble"; 9. "Next Best Thing"; 10. "Knock on Wood"
Traveler's Songbook: Releasing: November 25, 2014; Label: Samantha Stollenwerck Music	1. "Catherine the Great"; 2. "Youth Revolts"; 3. "Master of the Universe"; 4. "Chasing Valleys"; 5. "The Outsider"; 6. "Cherry Blossom"; 7. "Dandelions"; 8. "If I Leave LA"; 9. "Unbroken"; 10. "Onnalee"; 11. "Onnalee (Demo Extra)"
