= Gina Osterloh =

Filipino American artist (born 1973)

- Born: 1973 (age 52–53); San Antonio, Texas, United States
- Education: DePaul University (BA); University of California, Irvine (MA)
- Known for: Photography
- Movement: Contemporary; Conceptual
- Website: ginaosterloh.com

Gina Osterloh (born 1973) is a Filipino American conceptual artist who uses photography to question and investigate notions of self and identity. Best known for photographs that feature partly concealed bodies in "meticulously crafted room-sized sets," Osterloh challenges conventions of portraiture and often combines elements of performance, tableau, sculpture, installation, and drawing into photographs.

== Early life and education ==
Gina Osterloh was born in Texas and grew up in Columbus, Ohio. Osterloh has said she was introduced to darkroom photography as an undergraduate student at DePaul University in Chicago.

She earned an undergraduate degree at DePaul University before moving to San Francisco in the mid-1990s. During these formative years, Osterloh worked at the California College of the Arts and found mentorship with artists such as Nao Bustamante and Tammy Carland.

In 2007, Osterloh graduated from University of California, Irvine with a Master of Fine Arts in Studio Arts.

== Career ==
Osterloh has exhibited work internationally at galleries and museums including Yerba Buena Center for the Arts, the International Center of Photography, Ghebaly Gallery in Los Angeles, Atlanta Contemporary, Higher Pictures in New York City, and Silverlens in Manila. She has performed at art museums such as The Broad and the Museum of Contemporary Art, San Diego.

In 2017, Osterloh moved back to Columbus to accept a position as an Assistant Professor in the Department of Art at The Ohio State University.

=== Style and work ===
Often through photographs, Osterloh considers and explores the functions of photography, boundaries of self-identity, and viewers' perception of other bodies and identities. She cites her experience growing up multiracial in Ohio as influential to her photographic work.
