= Michelle Sank =

South African photographer

Michelle Sank is a South African photographer. She left South Africa in 1978 and has lived in Exeter, in the South West England, since 1987.

Her work is included in the collection of the Museum of Fine Arts Houston, the Center for Photography at Woodstock and the Royal Albert Memorial Museum.

In 2024 Sank received an Honorary Fellowship from The Royal Photographic Society.
