= Lilo Raymond =

American photographer (1922–2009)

- Born: 1922; Frankfurt, Germany
- Died: 2009 (aged 86–87)

Lilo Raymond (1922–2009) was an American photographer.

Raymond fled Nazi Germany in 1938, settling in New York City. There, she took classes at the Photo League. Her work is included in the collections of the Smithsonian American Art Museum, the Metropolitan Museum of Art the Princeton University Art Museum, and the Getty Museum, Los Angeles
