= Dan McCormack (photographer) =

Dan McCormack (born January 22, 1944, in Chicago, Illinois) is a photographer and professor at Marist College in New York, where he heads the photography program.

== Work ==
McCormack has led the Advanced Photography Seminar at the Dutchess County Art Association in Poughkeepsie, New York for over twenty years. He has photographed the nude for over forty years, working in the studio, various indoor settings, and out in the landscape of upstate New York. His book Body Light: Passages in a Relationship, a series of images of his wife Wendy, was published in 1988.

After studying with Aaron Siskind, Joseph Jachna, Arthur Siegel, and Wynn Bullock at the IIT Institute of Design in 1965, Dan McCormack started graduate school in 1968 at the School of the Art Institute of Chicago, where he began photographing the nude. At the Art Institute of Chicago he worked with Kenneth Josephson, Barbara Crane and Frank Barsotti. Since then, he has "explored figurative imagery in silver, cyanotype, palladium, and digital prints," while working with "Nimslo, Diana, Holga," and conventional cameras, as well as an office scanner and video camera. In his most recent series, he takes B&W photographs with an oatmeal box pinhole camera, then digitally colorizes them, with the result that the images are "rooted in sixteenth-century optics juxtaposed with twenty-first century digital technology."

Dan McCormack's photographs can be found in a number of textbooks--Light and Lens: Photography in the Digital Age (2007) and Exploring Color Photography (2004)--as well as in the collections of the Museum of Fine Arts, Houston; the Center for Creative Photography, University of Arizona; the Visual Studies Workshop in Rochester, New York; the Ontological Museum in Fort Worth, Texas; the Pinhole Resource in San Lorenzo, New Mexico; and the Ultimate Eye Foundation in San Francisco, California.

== Publications ==
- Body Light: Passages in a Relationship (McCormack) Mombaccus Press. ISBN 978-0-943556-04-8
- Exploring Color Photography, Fifth Edition: From Film to Pixels. (Hirsch) Focal Press. ISBN 978-0-240-81335-6
- Light and Lens: Photography in the Digital Age (Hirsch) Focal Press. ISBN 0-240-80855-X
- Exploring Color Photography (Hirsch) McGraw-Hill Humanities. ISBN 0-07-240706-9
- Black and White Photography: Manifest Visions (Luciana), Rockport Publishers ISBN 1-56496-647-X
- The Art of Enhanced Photography (Luciana) Rockport Publishers. ISBN 1-84000-195-X
- Tradition and the Unpredictable (Chasanoff) Museum of Fine Arts, Houston. ISBN 0-89090-059-0

== Reviews ==
- Photography Center of the Capital District, Troy New York
- Wilson Street Gallery (Charles Sturt College, Albury, Australia)
- Art Network News Quarterly: Emerging Artists Series

== Workshops ==
- Dan McCormack has offered his workshop "Photographing the Nude" at Unison Arts in New Paltz, New York. for over 20 years beginning in July 1993 until the present 2015.
