= Venetia Dearden =

British photographer and filmmaker

Venetia Dearden (born 1975) is a British photographer and filmmaker. Her books include Somerset Stories, Fivepenny Dreams (2008), Glastonbury, Another Stage (2010), Mulberry 40 Years (2011) and Eight Days (2012).

Dearden had a solo exhibition of her Glastonbury photographs at the National Portrait Gallery in London in 2010 and was awarded the Vic Odden Award from the Royal Photographic Society in 2011. Her work is held in the collection of the National Portrait Gallery.

== Biography ==
Dearden was born in Brecon, Wales. She grew up in Somerset, England.

She has an MA in Anthropology, Comparative Religion and History of Art from the University of Edinburgh (1998) and undertook postgraduate studies in Photojournalism at the London College of Printing (1999–2000).

Her photographs of local families living close to the land first brought her work to international attention in 2008, on publication of her book Somerset Stories, Fivepenny Dreams, which took six years to make.

In 2011 Dearden undertook a two-year commission from Mulberry to shoot a book celebrating the company's 40th anniversary.

== Publications ==
=== Publications by Dearden ===
- Somerset Stories, Fivepenny Dreams. Berlin: Kehrer, 2008. ISBN 978-3-86828-014-2.
- Glastonbury, Another Stage. Berlin: Kehrer, 2010. ISBN 978-3-868280-4-63.
- Mulberry 40 Years. Chilcompton, UK: Mulberry, 2011. Edited by Georgia Fendley. ISBN 978-0-956759-40-5.
- Eight Days. Berlin: Kehrer, 2011. ISBN 978-3-868282-54-2.

=== Publications paired with others ===
- Tangier: Notes from Late Summer. Khbar Bladna, 2015. With Elena Prentice.

=== Publications with contributions by Dearden ===
- Rise: Images of Life Change. Dubai: Legatum; London: Foto8, 2010. Edited by Jon Levy. ISBN 978-0-9559580-4-5. With text by Max Houghton and photographs by Dearden and others.

== Awards ==
- Vic Odden Award from the Royal Photographic Society, 2011

== Exhibitions ==
- Glastonbury: Another Stage, solo exhibition, National Portrait Gallery, London, 2010

== Collections ==
Dearden's work is held in the following public collection:

- National Portrait Gallery, London: 11 prints (as of May 2018)
