= Travel Photographer of the Year =

- Website: www.tpoty.com

Travel Photographer of the Year (TPOTY) is an international travel photography award, founded by professional photographer Chris Coe and his partner Karen Coe in 2003. The competition runs annually and is open to entries from photographers of all ages and abilities. Each year an overall winner is presented with the 'Travel Photographer of The Year' award, with additional winners selected from each of the year's categories. The competition is judged by an international panel of expert photographers and editors, assessing as many as 20,000 entries from over 142 different countries each year.

Since 2011, winning images (alongside runners-up) have been displayed in major TPOTY-held exhibitions in central London at venues such as the Royal Geographical Society and the University of Greenwich, and published in an accompanying series of Journey portfolio books.

== Exhibitions ==
In 2011 TPOTY entered into a 5-year agreement with the Royal Geographical Society to 'host major annual exhibitions of the awards’ travel photography' annually in South Kensington alongside events and workshops.

In 2016 TPOTY re-located to the University of Greenwich, signing a 2-year agreement to display the 2016 and 2017 exhibitions at the university's Stockwell Street campus.

For 2018 and 2019, the TPOTY exhibitions were hosted as 24-hour, open-air displays at London Bridge City.

== Journey books ==
Date of Publication	Volume Title	Years of Awards	Format
1 December 2004	Journey One	2003-2004	Hardcover
14 January 2007	Journey Two	2005-2006	Hardcover
1 February 2009	Journey Three	2007-2009	Hardcover
3 September 2012	Journey Four	2010-2011	Hardcover
1 October 2013	Journey Five	2012	Paperback
11 July 2014	Journey Six	2013	Paperback
24 July 2015	Journey Seven	2014	Paperback
22 July 2016	Journey Eight	2015	Paperback
July 2016	Journey Nine	2016	Paperback

== Winners ==
The overall winner is the photographer who has submitted the best images in two different portfolio categories. A young overall winner is also chosen. In addition, there are winners, runners-up, highly commended and commended entrants in all categories.

=== Travel Photographer of the Year ===
Year	Winner	Nationality
2018	Stefano Pensotti	Italy
2017	Alain Schroeder	Belgium
2016	Joel Santos	Portugal
2015	Marsel van Oosten	Netherlands
2014	Philip Lee Harvey	United Kingdom
2013	Timothy Allen	United Kingdom
2012	Craig Easton	United Kingdom
2011	Louis Montrose	United States
2010	Larry Louie	Canada
2009	GMB Akash	Bangladesh
2008	Darwin Wiggett	Canada
2007	Cat Vinton	United Kingdom
2006	Julian Love	United Kingdom
2005	Lorne Resnick	Canada
2004	Pang Piow Kan	Malaysia
2003	Peter Adams	United Kingdom

=== Young Travel Photographer of the Year ===
Year	Winner	Nationality
2018	Isabella Smith	United States
2017	Morgan Wolfers	United States
2016	Darpan Basak	India
2015	Chase Guttman	United States
2014	Samuel Fisch	United States
2013	Jonathan Rystrøm	Denmark
2012	Samuel Fisch	United States
2011	Arne Hansen	Germany
2010	Kat Waters	United Kingdom
2009	Courtney Krawec	Australia
2008	Daniel Rooney	United Kingdom
2007	Luna Malka	Canada
2006	Robert Dziabel	Germany
2005	Edward Mole	United Kingdom
2004	Anna Scott	United Kingdom
2003	Chris Charnock	United Kingdom

=== 2018 ===
Category	Winner	Nationality
Young Travel Photographer of the Year 14 and under	Daniel Kurian	India/Australia
Young Travel Photographer of the Year 15-18	Fardin Oyan	Bangladesh
Faces, People, Cultures	Marinka Masseus	Netherlands
Natural World	Javier Herranz Casellas	Spain
Travel	Matjaz Krivic	Slovenia
One Shot - Hot/Cold	Philip Lee Harvey, Andrew James	United Kingdom
One Shot - Tranquility	Simon Morris	United Kingdom
iTravelled	Nicola Young	United Kingdom
New Talent	Jose Antonio Rosa	Peru

=== 2017 ===
Category	Winner	Nationality
Young Travel Photographer of the Year 14 and under	Maddie Nolan	United States
Young Travel Photographer of the Year 15-18	Josiah Huddleston	United States / Japan
Celebration of Humanity	Paul Sansome	United Kingdom
Earth & Climate	Katherine Keates	Canada
Tales of Adventure	Emiliano Pinnizzotto	Italy
One Shot - Food	Jianhui Liao	China
One Shot - Primary Colours	Wendy Timmermans	Netherlands
One Shot - Wildlife & Nature	Johan Siggesson	Sweden
iTravelled	Pia Vachha	Netherlands
New Talent	Alexandre Zindy	France

=== 2016 ===
Category	Winner	Nationality
Young Travel Photographer of the Year 14 and under	Ankit Kumar	India
Young Travel Photographer of the Year 15-18	Courtney Moore	United States
Mankind	Ruiyuan Chen	China
Land, Sea, Sky	Craig Easton	United Kingdom
Journeys & Adventures	Beniamino Pisati	Italy
One Shot - Shaped by Light	Biran Zhao	China
One Shot - Cities & Architecture	Michele Palazzo	Italy
One Shot - Wildlife & Nature	Luke Massey	United Kingdom
iCaptured	Marina Spironetti	Italy
New Talent	Alison Cahill	United Kingdom

=== 2015 ===
Category	Winner	Nationality
Young Travel Photographer of the Year 14 and under	Michael Theodric	Indonesia
Young Travel Photographer of the Year 15-18	Spencer Cox	United States
Faces, People, Encounters	Mitchell Kanashkevich	Australia
Monochromal	Xia Xuejun	China
Nature & Environment	James Morgan	United Kingdom
One Shot - A Moment in Light	Uli Kunz	Germany
One Shot - Colours of the World	Larry Louie	Canada
One Shot - Water	Jasper Doest	Netherlands
iCaptured	Edgard de Bono	Italy
New Talent	Zhu Jingyi	China
