= Lydia Goldblatt =

British photographer

Lydia Goldblatt (born 1978) is a British photographer, living in London.

== Life and work ==
Goldblatt was born and lives in London. She gained a masters in photography from London College of Communication.

Her book Still Here (2013) contains photographs of her parents and of their home, in Hampstead, London.

== Publications ==
- Still Here. Berlin: Hatje Cantz, 2013. With essays by Christiane Monarchi and Goldblatt. ISBN 978-3-7757-3628-2.

== Awards ==
- 2020: Second prize, Taylor Wessing Photographic Portrait Prize

== Collections ==
Goldblatt's work is held in the following permanent collection:

- National Portrait Gallery, London: 1 print (as of 29 January 2023)
