= Jeremy Dennis =

Shinnecock photographer

- Born: 1990 (age 35–36); Southampton, New York
- Education: Stonybrook University
- Known for: large scale staged photography
- Notable work: On This Site – Indigenous Long Island
- Website: www.jeremynative.com

Jeremy Dennis (born 1990) is a Shinnecock photographer who creates large-scale staged photographs that deal with conflicts and situations between Indigenous and non-Indigenous individuals. He is an enrolled member of the Shinnecock Indian Nation in Southampton, New York.

== Education ==
Dennis received a BA in Studio Art from Stony Brook University, and an MFA from Pennsylvania State University.

== Work ==
Dennis considers his work as an exploration of "indigenous identity, cultural assimilation, and the ancestral traditional practices of my tribe, the Shinnecock Indian Nation." His process involves staging theatrical scenarios that portray the legacy of colonialism in the United States, focusing on the repressed guilt "among White settlers and their descendants."

Dennis has exhibited his work at the Parrish Art Museum, the Hudson River Museum, the Amon Carter Museum of American Art, among others.

A profile on the artist and his work in The New Yorker described his photographic series, On This Site–Indigenous Long Island, which depicts locations where "notorious historic incidents" took place as "quiet explorations of America’s intrinsic violence."

In 2021, Dennis founded Ma's House & BIPOC Art Studio, an artist-in-residence retreat and education center, on the Shinnecock Nation tribal lands in a house that belonged to his grandmother, Loretta A. Silva.

== Awards ==
In 2016 Dennis received a Dreamstarter grant from Running Strong for American Indian Youth to create his photographic project, On This Site – Indigenous Long Island. This was followed by a $50,000 Dreamstarter GOLD grant in 2020, and a fellowship from Art Matters Foundation.

== Collections ==
Dennis' work is held in the permanent collections of the Montclair Art Museum, the Amon Carter Museum of Art, the Parrish Art Museum, among others.
