= Michal Chelbin =

Israeli photographer

Michal Chelbin (Hebrew: מיכל חלבין; born 1974) is an Israeli-born photographer. Her work is held in the collections of the Tel Aviv Museum of Art, Israel; Metropolitan Museum, New York; LACMA; Getty Center, LA; and the Jewish Museum, New York.

== Early life ==
Chelbin was born and raised in Israel. She started photography at the age of 14.

== Career ==
Chelbin studied photography at WIZO academy of design and education in Haifa from 1997 to 2001.

In 2005 she had a solo exhibition, The Chapels, at Herzliya Museum of Contemporary Art, Israel.

In 2007 Chelbin first exhibited her project Strangely Familiar at Blue Sky Gallery, Portland. The project focused on performers from small towns in Ukraine, Eastern Europe, England, and Israel, and in 2008 it received the Constantiner Award for Photography from Tel Aviv Museum of Contemporary Art, Tel-Aviv. In the same year, Chelbin exhibited a solo exhibition under the same name at Tel Aviv Museum of Art. This project was also published as the book Strangely Familiar.

The Black Eye (2010) Chelbin continues Chelbin's interest in athletics as a photography subject. In Sailboats and Swans (2012) she made portraits inside prison facilities in Russia and Ukraine. With How to Dance The Waltz (2021) she focused on military boarding schools, matador training academies, and teenagers in Ukraine preparing for their proms.

Chelbin has participated in group shows in The Getty Center, Los Angeles, The Jewish Museum, New York, and the National Portrait Gallery, London.

She collaborated with fashion brand Dior Homme in 2016. She is a regular contributor to The New York Times Magazine, The New Yorker, GQ, and the Financial Times.

Chelbin cites Vermeer, Caravaggio, Velázquez, Diane Arbus, and August Sander as some of her biggest influences.

== Publications ==
- Strangely Familiar: Acrobats, Athletes and other Traveling Troupes (Aperture, 2008)
- The Black Eye (Twin Palms, 2010)
- Sailboats and Swans (Twin Palms, 2012)
- How to Dance the Waltz (Damiani, 2021)

== Solo exhibitions ==
- 2005 The Chapels, Herzliya Museum of Contemporary Art, Herzliya
- 2008 Strangely Familiar, Tel Aviv Museum of Art
- 2013 Sailboats and Swans, Hellenic Center for Photography, Athens, Greece
- 2021 How to Dance the Waltz, ClampArt, New York City

== Collections ==
Chelbin's work is held in the following permanent collections:

- Metropolitan Museum, New York
- LACMA, LA
- Portland Museum of Art
- San Francisco Moma
- The Kadist Art Foundation, Paris
- Getty Center, LA
- Jewish Museum, New York
- Tel Aviv Museum of Art, Israel

== Awards ==
- 2002 America-Israel Cultural Foundation Scholarship
- 2003 Artist in Residence, Hammeau des Artistes, Paris
- 2007: Constantiner Award for Photography –Tel Aviv
- 2009: Shortlisted, Taylor Wessing Photographic Portrait Prize, London
