= Portrait Salon =

Photography competition

Portrait Salon is a competition that aims to show the best of the rejected photographs from the juried Taylor Wessing Photographic Portrait Prize. A judge is usually invited to make the selection and the work is shown in a number of exhibitions and in an accompanying catalogue. It was founded in 2011 by Carole Evans and James O Jenkins.

The portrait photography competition took place in 2011, 2012, 2013, 2014, 2015, 2016, 2017, 2018 (when it also accepted rejections from the Portrait of Britain competition), and 2019.

== Publications ==
- Portrait Salon '11. 2011. Newspaper format.
- Portrait Salon '12. 2012. Newspaper format.
- Portrait Salon '13. 2013. Newspaper format.
- Portrait Salon '14. 2014. Newspaper format.
- Portrait Salon '15. 2015. Newspaper format.
- Portrait Salon '16. 2016.
- Portrait Salon '18. 2018. Pack of cards format.
- Portrait Salon '19. 2019.

== See also ==
- Salon des Refusés
