= Px3 =

European photography award

The Prix de la Photographie, Paris or Px3 is a European photography award. It was founded in 2007 and includes a Gold Award, Silver Award and Bronze Award.

Winning photographs from the competition are exhibited in a gallery in Paris and published in an annual book.

== Publications ==
- PX3.01. Los Angeles: Prix de la Photographie, Paris, 2007.
- PX3.02. Los Angeles: Prix de la Photographie, Paris, 2008.
- PX3.03. Los Angeles: Prix de la Photographie, Paris, 2009.
- PX3.04. Los Angeles: Prix de la Photographie, Paris, 2010.
- PX3.05. Los Angeles: Prix de la Photographie, Paris, 2011.
- PX3.06. Los Angeles: Prix de la Photographie, Paris, 2012.
- PX3.07. Los Angeles: Prix de la Photographie, Paris, 2013.
- PX3.08. Los Angeles: Prix de la Photographie, Paris, 2014.
- PX3.09. Los Angeles: Prix de la Photographie, Paris, 2015.
- PX3.10. Los Angeles: Prix de la Photographie, Paris, 2016.
- PX3.11. Los Angeles: Prix de la Photographie, Paris, 2020.
