= Kalpesh Patel (Indian cricketer) =

Indian cricketer (born 1976)

Personal information
- Full name: Kalpesh Himmatbhai Patel
- Born: 14 October 1976 (age 50); Surat, Gujarat, India
- Batting: Left-handed
- Bowling: Slow left-arm orthodox

Career statistics
Competition	FC	LA
Matches	5	4
Runs scored	32	14
Batting average	5.33	7.00
100s/50s	0/0	0/0
Top score	9*	10
Balls bowled	859	210
Wickets	10	10
Bowling average	40.90	15.30
5 wickets in innings	1	0
10 wickets in match	0	N/A
Best bowling	6/96	4/37
Catches/stumpings	0/0	2/0
- Source: CricketArchive, 20 April 2009

Kalpesh Himmatbhai Patel (born 14 October 1976) is an Indian cricketer who has played a handful of games for Gujarat.

By some way Patel's best performance came against Andhra in the Pre-Quarter-Final of the 2001-02 Ranji Trophy, when he took 6/96 in the first innings.
