= Kalpesh Lathigra =

British photographer

Kalpesh Lathigra (born 1971) is a British photographer. He initially worked as a photojournalist and won a 1st prize award in the World Press Photo competition. Later he switched focus to personal artistic projects and produced Lost in the Wilderness (2015) and Memoire Temporelle (2022).

== Life and work ==
Lathigra was born and raised in east London. His family migrated from Junagadh, India to the UK via Kenya and Zanzibar over three generations, before he was born.

He earned a postgraduate diploma in photojournalism at the London College of Printing. He worked as a photojournalist for newspapers from 1994 to 2000, then on long term projects and magazine and commercial assignments. Around this time he moved away from photojournalism.

Lost in the Wilderness (2015) revisits the scene of the Wounded Knee Massacre, where in 1890, the United States Army killed nearly three hundred Lakota people. Sean O'Hagan, reviewing the book in The Guardian, wrote that "Lost in the Wilderness moves between the intimate and the subtlety [sic] symbolic. It captures the reality of life on the reservations – the flat, barren land, drab rooms, careworn faces – as well as some moments of dark irony".

Memoire Temporelle (2022), explores the limbo of Lathigra's own lack of belonging in the UK or India, "without needing to resolve it." Translated as temporal memory, the book was made between 2016 and 2019 across eight trips he made to Mumbai. The disparate objects and scenes, shot in both black-and-white and colour, are "emotional resonances" for Lathigra given he could have lived in Mumbai had his family not migrated. The photographs are punctuated with translated extracts from the writings of India's Nobel laureate Rabindranath Tagore, and poems by Lathigra.

Lathigra has an ongoing project called A Democratic Portrait in which he makes portraits using a Polaroid Studio Express—a simple four-lens instant film camera typically used to make passport photos.

== Publications ==
- Lost in the Wilderness. London: self-published, 2015. ISBN 978-0993469503. With an essay by Garvard Goodplume Jr.
- Memoire Temporelle = temporal memory. 2022. ISBN 978-1-7397718-0-5. With translated extracts of writings by Rabindranath Tagore, and poems by Lathigra.

== Awards ==
- 2000: 1st prize, Arts and Entertainment category, World Press Photo, Amsterdam

== Exhibitions ==
=== Solo exhibitions ===
- The Tree of a Man named Beohha – Becontree Now, Royal Institute of British Architects, London, 2021/22. A study of the Becontree estate, London Borough of Barking and Dagenham.

=== Group exhibitions ===
- Facing Britain: British Documentary Photography since the 1960s, Kunsthalle Darmstadt, Germany, 2021/22
