= Taylor Wessing Photographic Portrait Prize =

Annual photographic portrait prize (2003-present)

The Taylor Wessing Photographic Portrait Prize is an annual photographic portrait prize awarded by the National Portrait Gallery in London. It was established in 2003 as the Schweppes Photographic Portrait Prize. In the years 2006 and 2007 it was referred to simply as the Photographic Portrait Prize. In 2008 the name of the new sponsors, Taylor Wessing, was prepended to the prize name. Taylor Wessing's relationship with the Gallery began in 2005 with their sponsorship of The World's Most Photographed.

The prize is an open competition accepting submissions from amateur and professional photographers from anywhere. From about 6,000 submissions, 60 photographs are selected for exhibition at the National Portrait Gallery between November and February. A shortlist of usually four photographers receives prizes which in 2012 were: £12,000 for first; £3,000 for second; £2,000 for third; and £1,000 for fourth. The competition is judged by a panel chaired by the Director of the National Portrait Gallery. In addition, there is an independently sponsored prize for a specific category, usually young photographers.

== Prize winners ==
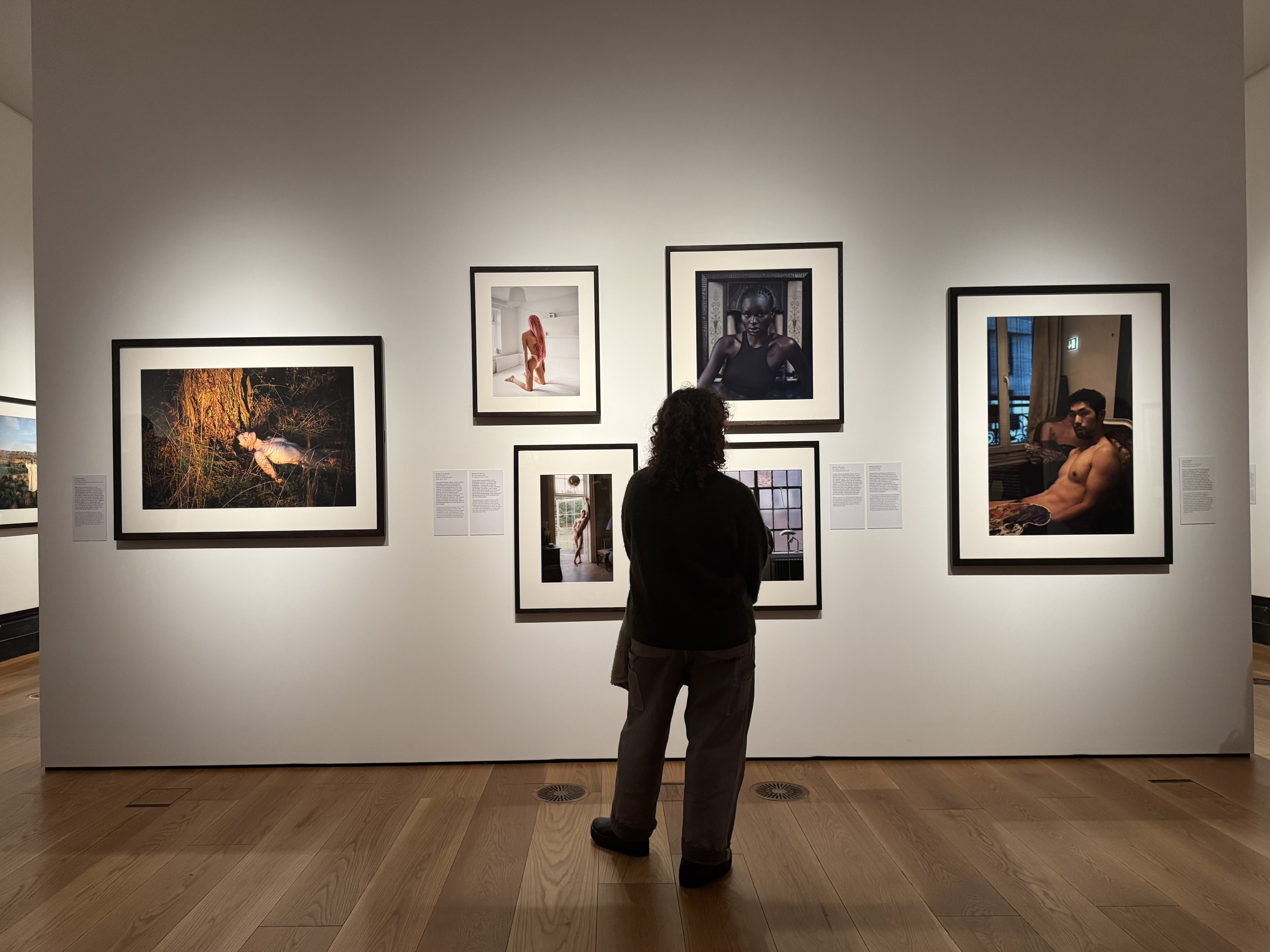
Viewing the 2024 Taylor Wessing Photographic Portrait Prize at the National Portrait Gallery, London

=== Schweppes Photographic Portrait Prize 2003 ===
1. Roben Antoniewicz
2. Victor Albrow
3. Alan Powdrill
4. Nadav Kander

The Deloitte Commission, for photographers 25 or under, was David Yeo.

=== Schweppes Photographic Portrait Prize 2004 ===
1. Jens Lucking
2. James Reeve
3. Angus Fraser
4. Henrik Knudsen

The Deloitte Commission, for photographers 25 or under, was Paul Plews.

=== Schweppes Photographic Portrait Prize 2005 ===
1. Shara Henderson
2. Philipp Ebeling
3. Ric Bower
4. Magnus Reed

The Deloitte Commission, for photographers 25 or under, was Karoline Hjorth.

=== Photographic Portrait Prize 2006 ===
1. Richard Boll
2. Anna Bauer
3. Kiran Master
4. Kyoko Hamada

The Deloitte Commission, for photographers 25 or under, was Erin Kornfeld.

=== Photographic Portrait Prize 2007 ===
1. Jonathan Torgovnik
2. Julieta Sans
3. Michelle Sank
4. David Stewart

The Godfrey Argent Award, for photographers 25 or under, was Ivor Pricket.

=== Taylor Wessing Photographic Portrait Prize 2008 ===
1. Lottie Davies
2. Hendrik Kerstens
3. Catherine Balet
4. Tom Stoddart

The Godfrey Argent Award, for the best portrait in black and white, was awarded to Vanessa Winship.

=== Taylor Wessing Photographic Portrait Prize 2009 ===
1. Paul Floyd Blake
2. Vanessa Winship
3. Michal Chelbin
4. Mirjana Vrbaski

The Godfrey Argent Award, for photographers between 18 and 25, and the Elle commission was Ali Lomas.

=== Taylor Wessing Photographic Portrait Prize 2010 ===
1. David Chancellor
2. Panayiotis Lamprou
3. Jeffrey Stockbridge
4. Abbie Trayler-Smith

The Elle Commission was won by Clare Shilland.

=== Taylor Wessing Photographic Portrait Prize 2011 ===
1. Jooney Woodward
2. Jill Wooster
3. Dona Schwartz
4. Jasper Clarke
5. David Knight

The Elle Commission was won by Jasper Clarke.

=== Taylor Wessing Photographic Portrait Prize 2012 ===
1. Jordi Ruiz Cirera
2. Jennifer Pattison
3. Spencer Murphy
4. Alma Haser

The John Kobal New Work Award, for photographers under 30, was awarded to Matthew Niederhauser.

The judges were Sean O'Hagan (photography critic at The Guardian), Emma Hardy, Lauren Heinz (director of Foto8), Glyn Morgan (a partner at Taylor Wessing LLP), Sandy Nairne (director of the National Portrait Gallery) and Terence Pepper (curator of photographs at the National Portrait Gallery).

=== Taylor Wessing Photographic Portrait Prize 2013 ===
1. Spencer Murphy
2. Giles Price
3. Anoush Abrar
4. Dorothee Deiss

=== Taylor Wessing Photographic Portrait Prize 2014 ===
1. First prize was awarded to David Titlow for "Konrad Lars Hastings Titlow"
2. Second prize was awarded to Jessica Fulford-Dobson for "Skate Girl"
3. Third prize was awarded to Birgit Püve for "Braian and Ryan"
4. Fourth prize was awarded to Blerim Racaj for "Indecisive Moment"

The John Kobal New Work Award was awarded to Laura Pannack for "Chayla in Shul"

=== Taylor Wessing Photographic Portrait Prize 2015 ===
1. First prize was awarded to David Stewart for "Five Girls 2014"
2. Second prize was awarded to Anoush Abrar for "Hector"
3. Third prize was awarded to Peter Zelewski for "Nyaueth"
4. Fourth prize was awarded to Ivor Prickett for "Amira and her Children"

The John Kobal New Work Award was awarded to Tereza Cervenová for "Yngvild"

=== Taylor Wessing Photographic Portrait Prize 2016 ===
1. First prize was awarded to Claudio Rasano for "Katlehong Matsenen 2016" from the series Similar Uniforms: We Refuse to Compare
2. Second prize was awarded to Joni Sternbach for "16.02.20 #1 Thea+Maxwell" from the series Surfland
3. Third prize was awarded to Kovi Konowiecki for "Shimi Beitar Illit" and "Tilly and Itty Beitar Illit" from the series Bei Mir Bistu Shein

The John Kobal New Work Award was awarded to Josh Redman for "Frances"

=== Taylor Wessing Photographic Portrait Prize 2017 ===
1. First prize was awarded to César Dezfuli for a photograph of Amadou Sumaila
2. Second prize was awarded to Abbie Trayler-Smith for a photograph of a girl fleeing Isis in Mosul, Iraq
3. Third prize was awarded to Maija Tammi for a photograph of an android

The John Kobal New Work Award was also awarded to Tammi

=== Taylor Wessing Photographic Portrait Prize 2018 ===
1. First prize was awarded to Alice Mann for "Drummies" (a series of four works). A prize of £15,000.
2. Second prize was awarded to Enda Bowe for a photograph from the series Clapton Blossom. A prize of £3,000.
3. Joint Third prize was awarded to Max Barstow for an untitled photograph and to Joey Lawrence for a photograph from the series Tombo's Wound. A prize of £2,000 each.

=== Taylor Wessing Photographic Portrait Prize 2019 ===
1. First prize (£15,000): Pat Martin for two photographs from his series about his late mother, "Goldie (Mother)"
2. Second prize (£3,000): Enda Bowe for "Neil", a portrait from a series exploring youth culture on either side of the Belfast peace lines
3. Third prize (£2,000): Garrod Kirkwood for "The Hubbucks," a photograph of a family on route to Whitley Bay beach

=== Taylor Wessing Photographic Portrait Prize 2020 ===
1. First prize (£15,000): Alys Tomlinson for portraits of Samuel, Jack and Jameela from the series Lost Summer
2. Second prize (£3,000): Lydia Goldblatt for a photograph of a child in a tent in the garden
3. Third prize (£2,000): Yolanda Y Liou for a portrait of the model, instagrammer and plus size advocate Enam Ewura Adjoa Asiama

=== Taylor Wessing Photographic Portrait Prize 2021 ===
1. First prize (£15,000): David Prichard, for the series Tribute to Indigenous Stock Women
2. Second prize (£3,000): Pierre-Elie de Pibrac, for the series Hakanai Sonzai
3. Third prize (£2,000): Katya Ilina, for David, a portrait from the series Rosemary & Thyme

=== Taylor Wessing Photographic Portrait Prize 2022 ===
1. First Prize (£15,000): Clémentine Schneidermann for the series Laundry Day
2. Second Prize (£3,000): Haneem Christian for Mother and Daughter from the series Jannah Lies at the Feet of Thy Mother
3. Third Prize (£2,000): Alexander Komenda for Zahid's Son from the series The Lost Enchiridion of the Fergana Valley

=== Taylor Wessing Photographic Portrait Prize 2023 ===
1. First prize (£15,000): Alexandre Silberman: Diena, from the series Nature
2. Second prize (£3,000): Gilleam Trapenberg: Kisha and LaDarayon, from the series Currents
3. Joint third prize (£2,000): Jake Green: Shaun Ryder
4. Joint third prize (£2,000): Carl Francois van de Linde: Chotu Lal Upside-down from the series Our Leader

=== Taylor Wessing Photographic Portrait Prize 2024 ===
1. First prize (£15,000): Steph Wilson: Sonam, from the series Ideal Mother
2. Second prize (£3,000): Adam Ferguson: three images taken in the Northern Territory and Western Australia, from the book Big Sky
3. Third prize (£2,000): Tjitske Sluis: Mom, from the series Out of Love, Out of Necessity
4. Taylor Wessing Photographic Commission (£8,000): Jesse Navarre Vos: Mom, I’ll follow you still, from the series I’ll Come Following You

=== Taylor Wessing Photographic Portrait Prize 2025 ===
1. First prize (£15,000): Martina Holmberg: "Mel", from the series The Outside of the Inside
2. Second prize (£3,000): Luan Davide Gray: "We Dare to Hug", from the series Call Me By Your Name
3. Third prize (£2,000): Byron Mohammad Hamzah: "Jaidi Playing", from the series Bunga dan Tembok (The Flower and the Wall: The Stateless Youths of Semporna)
4. Taylor Wessing Photographic Commission (£8,000): Hollie Fernando: "Boss Morris", from the series Hoydenish

== See also ==
- Portrait Salon
