= Carl Friedrich Höge =

German photographer and entomologist

- Born: 2 July 1834; Hamburg, Germany
- Died: 23 January 1908 (aged 73); Hamburg, Germany
- Occupation(s): Photographer and Entomologist

Carl Friedrich Höge (1834–1908), also written Carl Frederik Hoege, was a German photographer and entomologist.

== Biography ==
Höge was born in Hamburg, Germany on 2 July 1834.

His first job was as a confectioner before becoming a professional photographer. He made entomological collections in Lapland and three collecting trips to Mexico (1879–1880, 1885–1886 and 1896). Höge's trips to Mexico were made on behalf of his friend, the banker and entomologist Julius Flohr (1837–1896).

Höge died in Hamburg on 23 January 1908.

== Entomology ==
Höge is credited as one of the entomologists whose Coleoptera material was used for Frederick Godman and Osbert Salvin's project Biologia Centrali-Americana—the beetles Höge had collected in Mexico were worked on by Henry Walter Bates.

The Mexican Carabinae beetle subspecies Calosoma digueti hoegei Breuning, 1928 was named in honour of Höge.

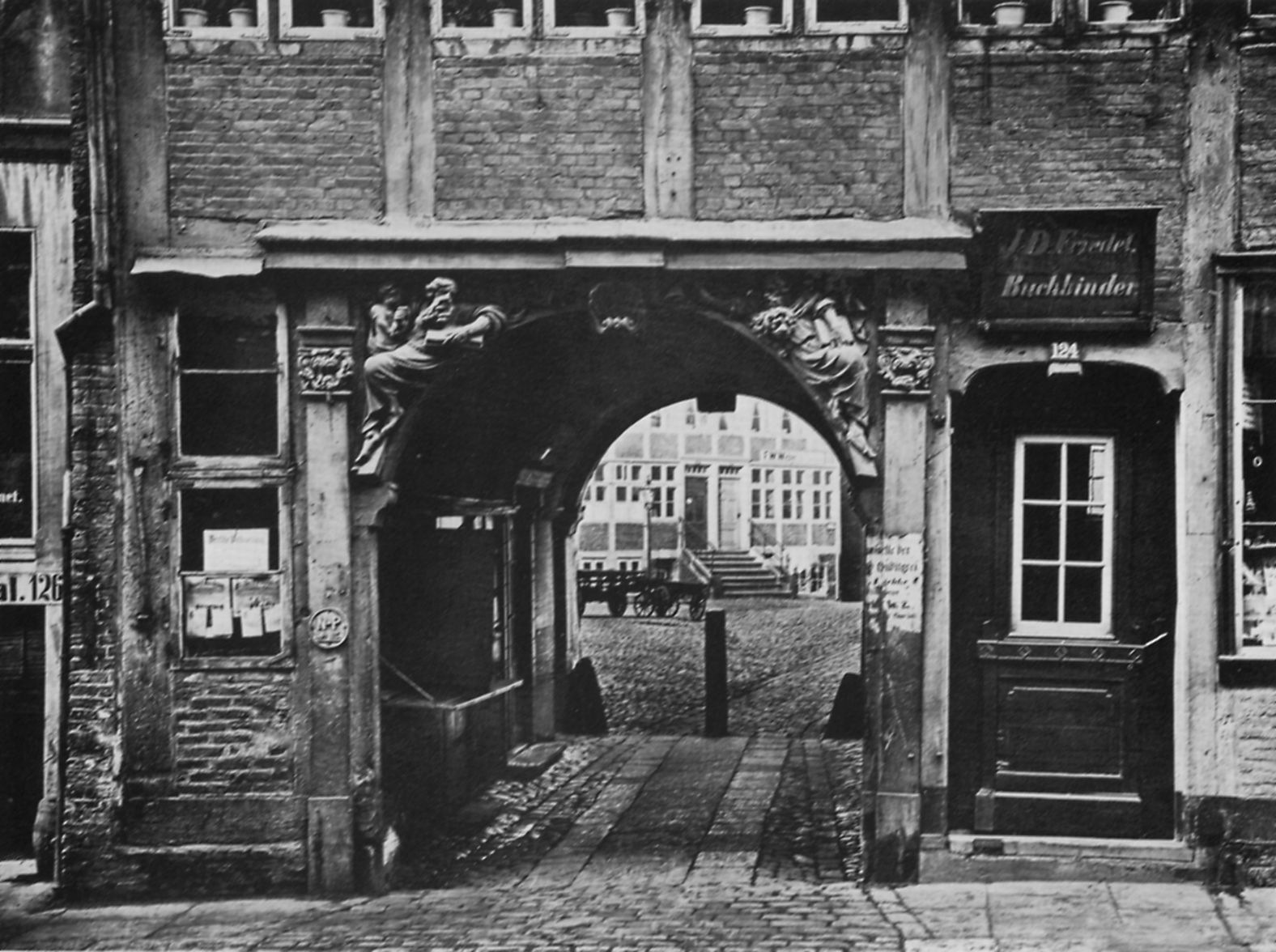
Photograph by Höge: View of a bookbinder's shop at number 124, Steinstraße looking through to the Jakobikirchhof, Hamburg. The carved archway is now preserved at the Museum of Hamburg History.

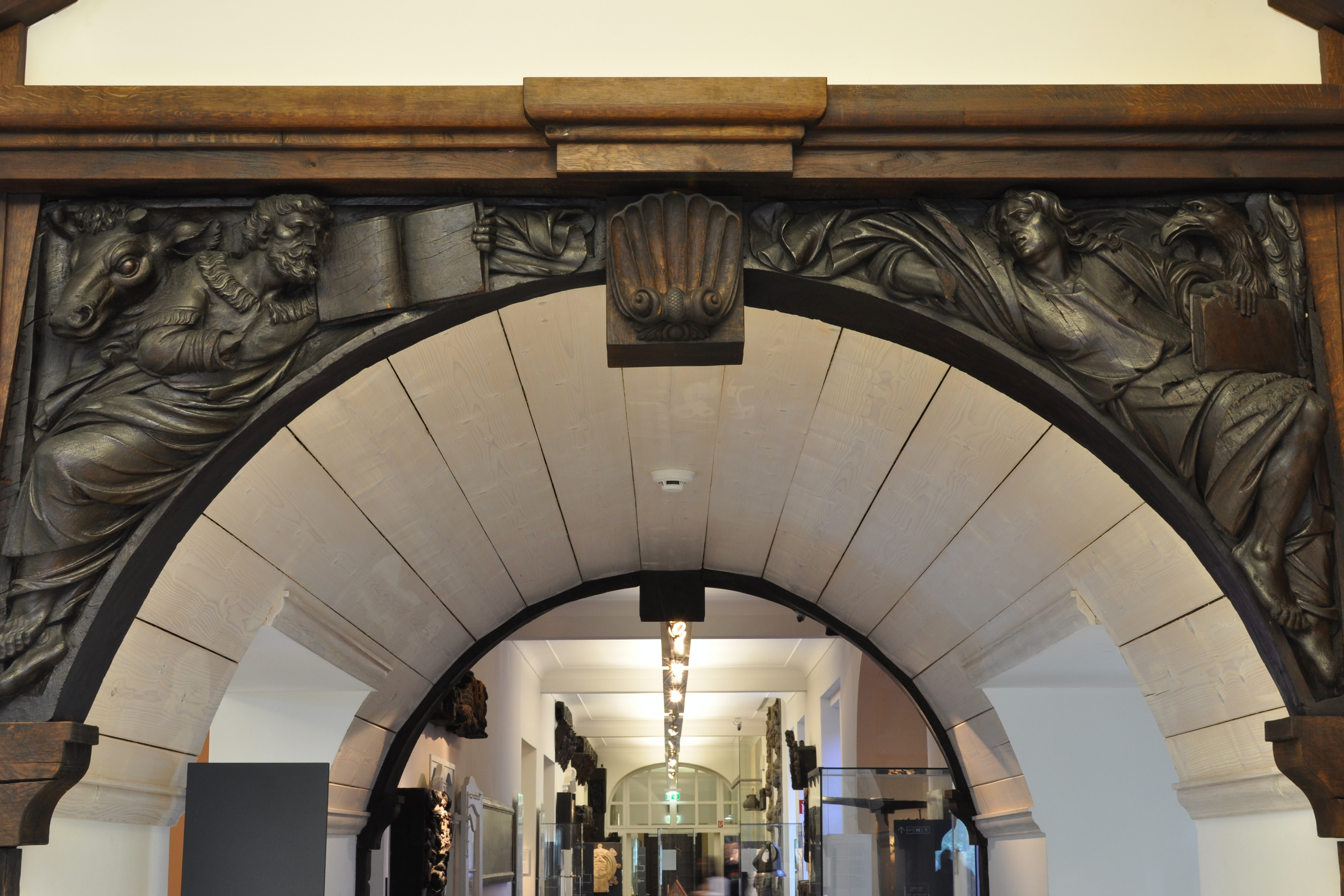
Archway from Steinstraße 124, Hamburg once photographed in situ by Höge, and now preserved at the Museum of Hamburg History.

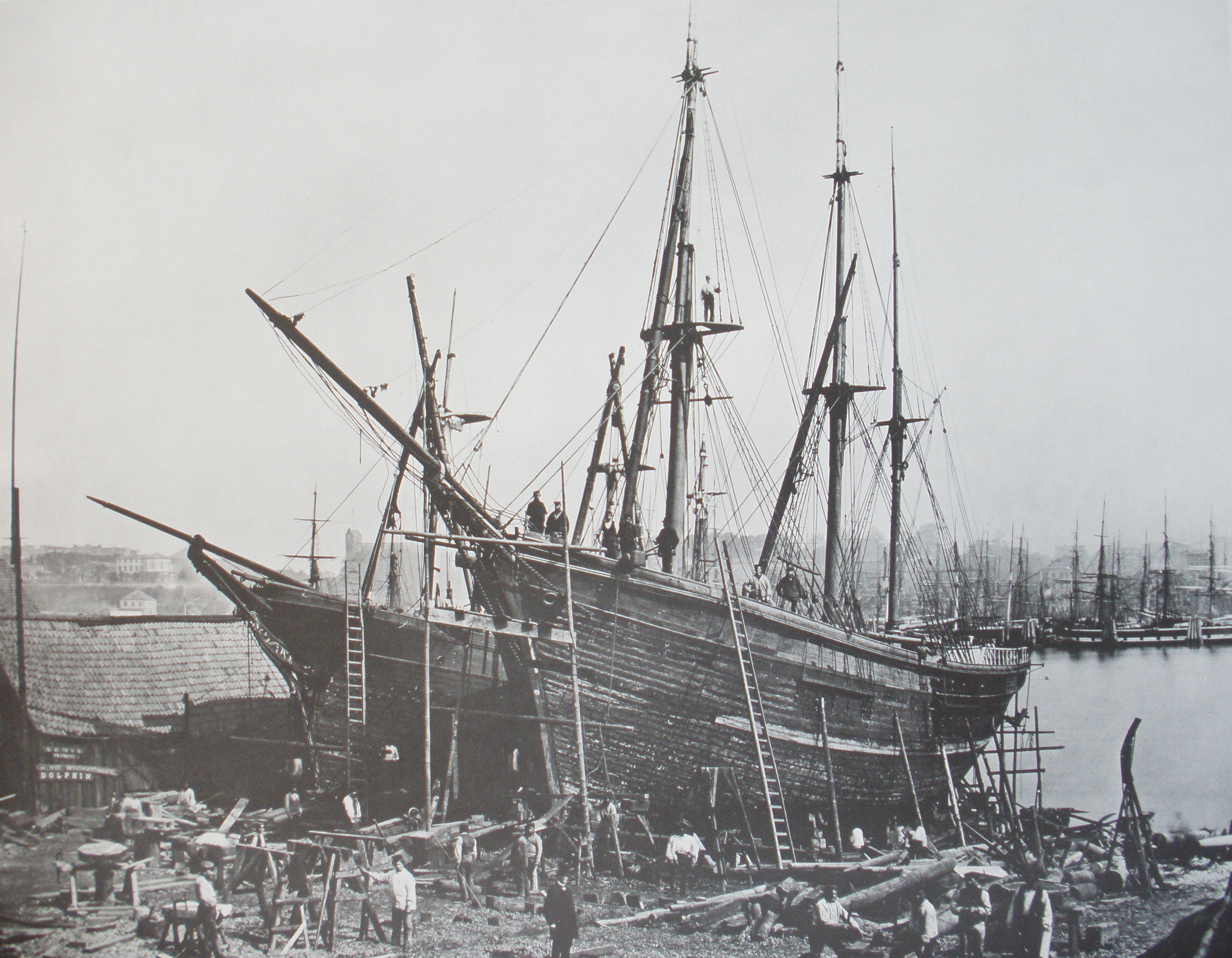
Photograph by Höge: dock port of Hamburg, Germany. Repair work on wooden ships, c. 1865.

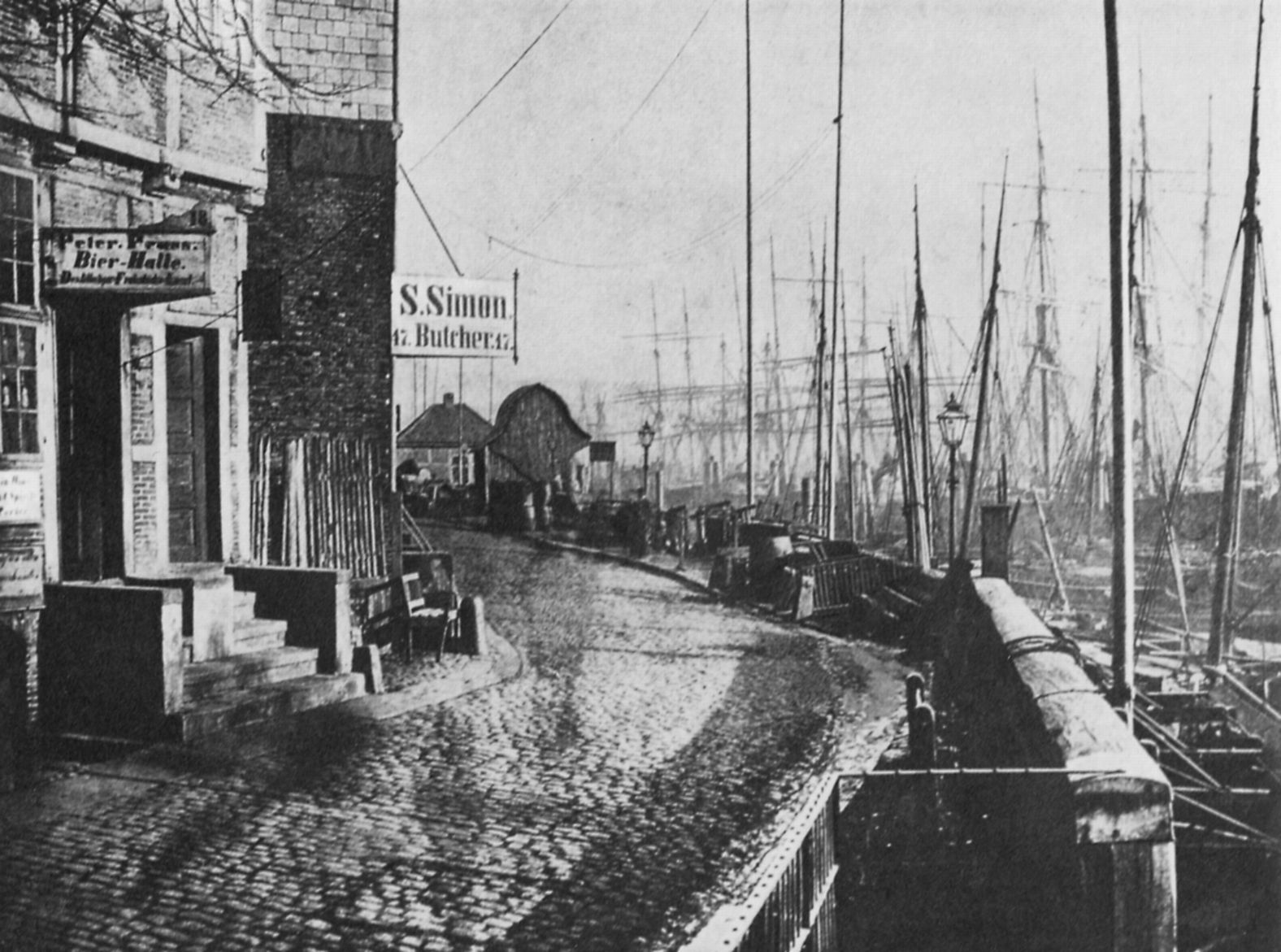
Photograph by Höge: Vorsetzen, Hamburg 1864.

== Photography ==
Höge had a photography studio at 28 Alter Wandrahm, Hamburg, as can be seen from the address printed on a Höge cabinet card (collection of the British Museum). In 1886, Höge's photography business was based at 41 Schäferkampsallee, Hamburg.
