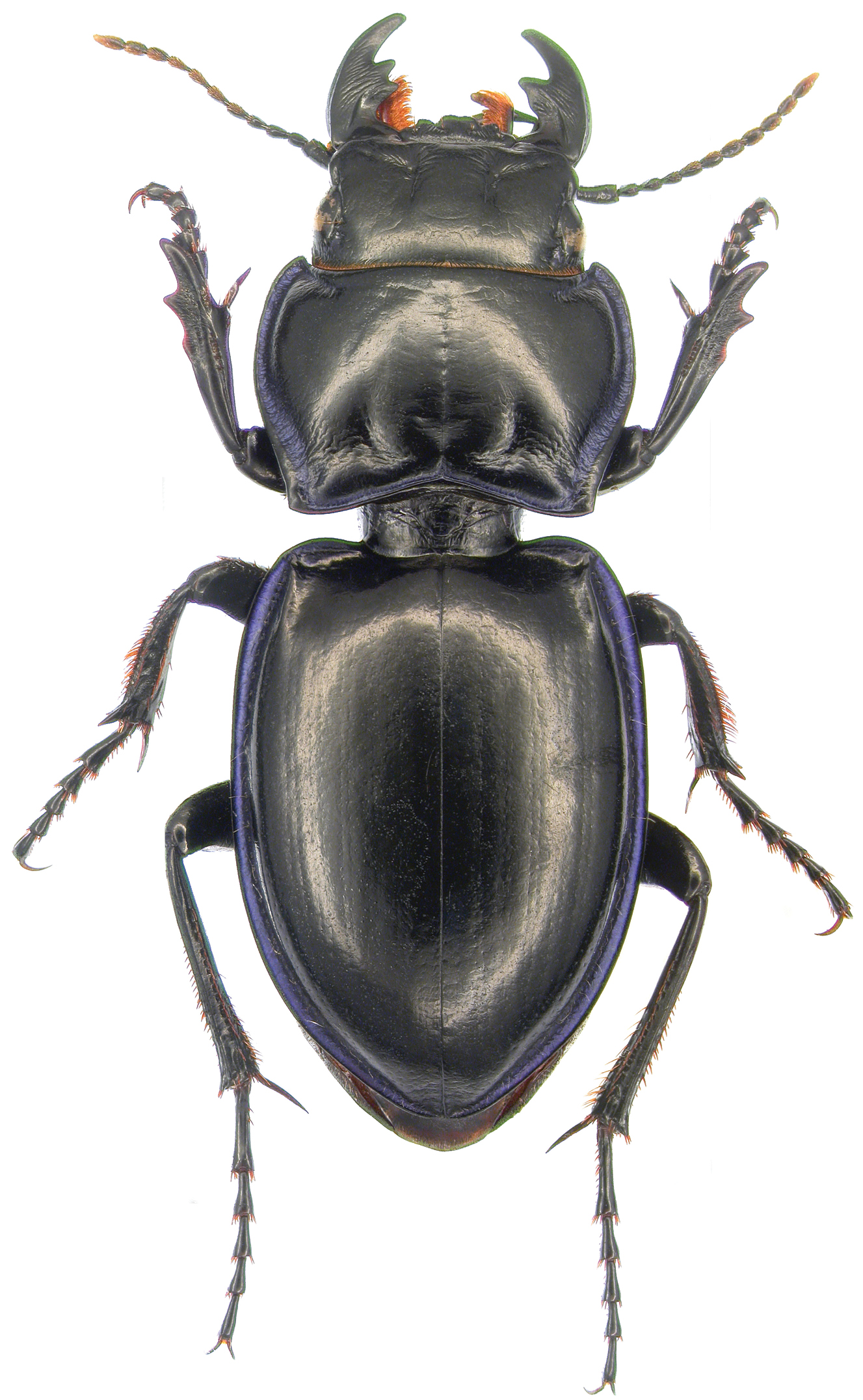
- Pasimachus elongatus

Scientific classification
- Domain: Eukaryota
- Kingdom: Animalia
- Phylum: Arthropoda
- Class: Insecta
- Order: Coleoptera
- Suborder: Adephaga
- Family: Carabidae
- Subfamily: Scaritinae
- Tribe: Pasimachini
- Genus: Pasimachus; Bonelli, 1813

= Pasimachus =

Genus of beetles

Pasimachus (/ˌpɑːsɪˈmɑːkəs/) is a genus of North American beetles in the family Carabidae

== Etymology ==
While the exact reason for the naming of the genus is unknown, the name has been theorized to have been derived from Ancient Greek πᾶς (pâs; "all") and μᾰχητής, (makhētḗs; "warrior", "fighter"). It also coincides with the name of Pasimachus, a cavalry commander mentioned in Hellenica. The reason for this naming could be due to the genus' large mandibles and carnivory.

== Species ==
- Pasimachus ambiguus Bänninger, 1950
- Pasimachus aurocinctus Chaudoir, 1880
- Pasimachus californicus Chaudoir, 1850
- Pasimachus cardioderus (Chaudoir, 1880)
- Pasimachus cordicollis (Chaudoir, 1862)
- Pasimachus cuestai Kohlmann, 1993
- Pasimachus depressus (Fabricius, 1787)
- Pasimachus duplicatus LeConte, 1853
- Pasimachus elongatus LeConte, 1846
- Pasimachus imitator Bänninger, 1950
- Pasimachus intermedius (Chaudoir, 1880)
- Pasimachus laevisulcatus H. W. Bates, 1891
- Pasimachus marginatus (Fabricius, 1787)
- Pasimachus metallicus (Chaudoir, 1880)
- Pasimachus mexicanus G. R. Gray, 1832
- Pasimachus obsoletus LeConte, 1846
- Pasimachus pacificus Bänninger, 1950
- Pasimachus perpolitus Casey, 1913
- Pasimachus punctulatus Haldeman, 1843
- Pasimachus purpuratus (Putzeys, 1846)
- Pasimachus quadricollis Chaudoir, 1880
- Pasimachus quirozi Flohr, 1887
- Pasimachus rotundipennis Chevrolat, 1834
- Pasimachus sallei Chaudoir, 1862
- Pasimachus sexualis Bänninger, 1950
- Pasimachus smithi H. W. Bates, 1891
- Pasimachus strenuus LeConte, 1874
- Pasimachus subangulatus (Chaudoir, 1862)
- Pasimachus sublaevis (Palisot de Beauvois, 1811)
- Pasimachus subsulcatus Say, 1823
- Pasimachus tolucanus Chaudoir, 1880
- Pasimachus viridans LeConte, 1858
