= Pasimachus punctulatus =

Scientific classification
- Domain: Eukaryota
- Kingdom: Animalia
- Phylum: Arthropoda
- Class: Insecta
- Order: Coleoptera
- Suborder: Adephaga
- Family: Carabidae
- Genus: Pasimachus
- Species: P. punctulatus

Binomial name
- Pasimachus punctulatus Haldeman, 1843

Species of beetle

Pasimachus punctulatus is a species of ground beetle in the family Carabidae. It is found in North America.
