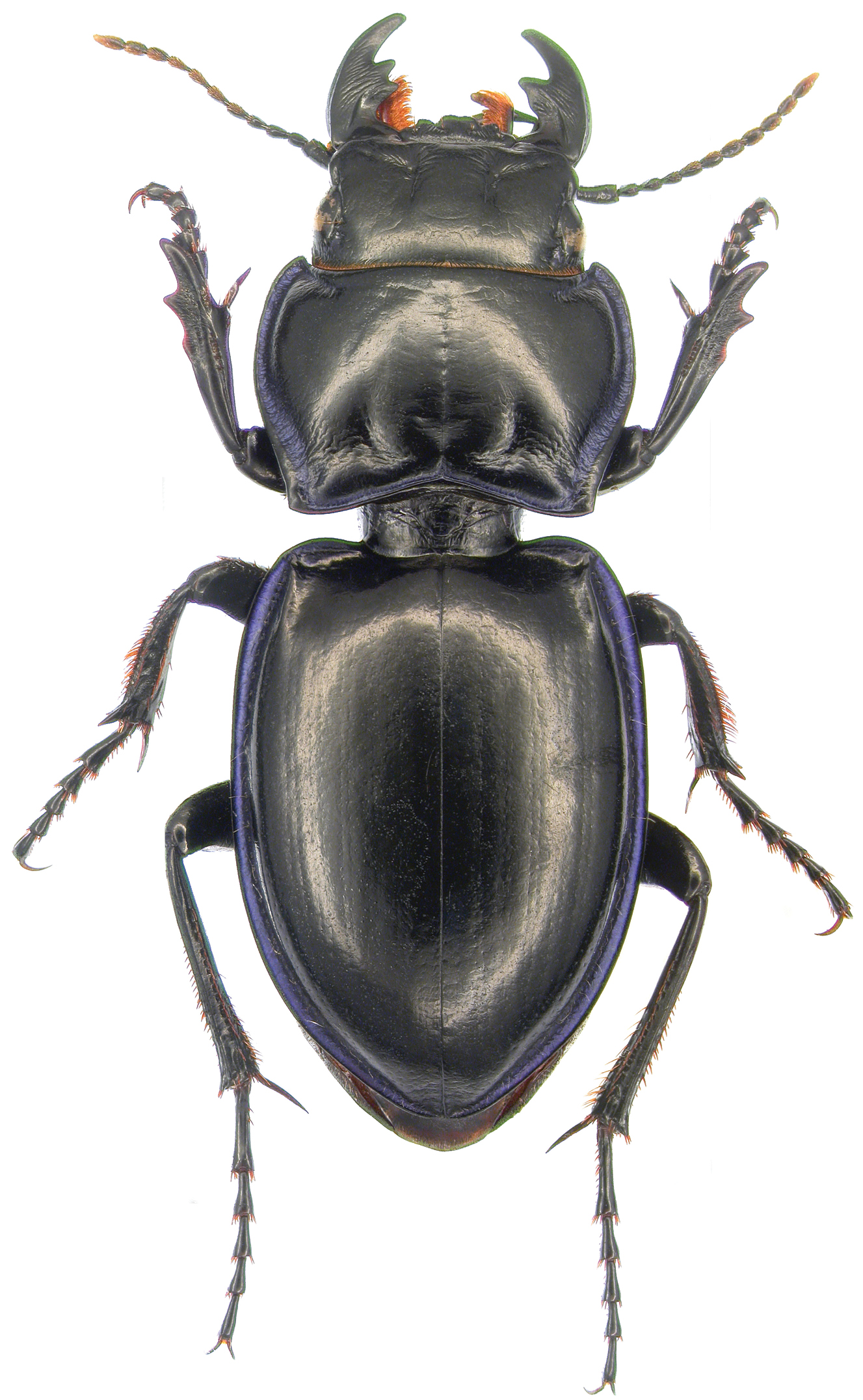

Scientific classification
- Kingdom: Animalia
- Phylum: Arthropoda
- Class: Insecta
- Order: Coleoptera
- Suborder: Adephaga
- Family: Carabidae
- Genus: Pasimachus
- Species: P. elongatus

Binomial name
- Pasimachus elongatus LeConte, 1846

= Pasimachus elongatus =

Species of beetle

Pasimachus elongatus is a species of ground beetle in the family Carabidae. It is found in Central America and North America.
