= Pasimachus marginatus =

Scientific classification
- Kingdom: Animalia
- Phylum: Arthropoda
- Clade: Pancrustacea
- Class: Insecta
- Order: Coleoptera
- Suborder: Adephaga
- Family: Carabidae
- Genus: Pasimachus
- Species: P. marginatus

Binomial name
- Pasimachus marginatus (Fabricius, 1787)

Species of beetle

Pasimachus marginatus is a species of ground beetle in the family Carabidae. It is found in North America.
