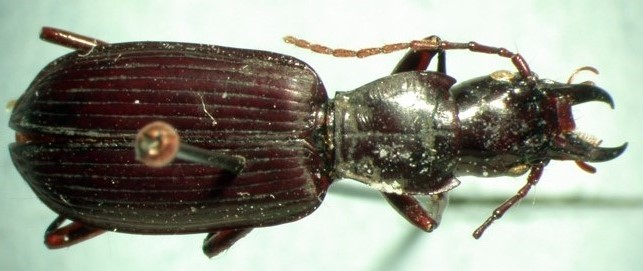
- Hybothecus mateui

Scientific classification
- Kingdom: Animalia
- Phylum: Arthropoda
- Clade: Pancrustacea
- Class: Insecta
- Order: Coleoptera
- Suborder: Adephaga
- Family: Carabidae
- Tribe: Pterostichini
- Genus: Hybothecus; Chaudoir, 1874

= Hybothecus =

Genus of beetles

Hybothecus is a genus of beetles in the family Carabidae, containing the following species:

- Hybothecus aequatorius (Chaudoir, 1878)
- Hybothecus aequidianus (Moret, 1997)
- Hybothecus anomalus (Chaudoir, 1878)
- Hybothecus flohri (Bates, 1882)
- Hybothecus incrassatus Chaudoir, 1874
- Hybothecus mateui (Straneo, 1958)
- Hybothecus sculptilis (Putzeys, 1878)
