= Pasimachus viridans =

Scientific classification
- Domain: Eukaryota
- Kingdom: Animalia
- Phylum: Arthropoda
- Class: Insecta
- Order: Coleoptera
- Suborder: Adephaga
- Family: Carabidae
- Genus: Pasimachus
- Species: P. viridans

Binomial name
- Pasimachus viridans LeConte, 1858

Species of beetle

Pasimachus viridans is a species of ground beetle in the family Carabidae. It is found in Central America and North America.

== Subspecies ==
These two subspecies belong to the species Pasimachus viridans:

- Pasimachus viridans ambiens Casey
- Pasimachus viridans viridans
