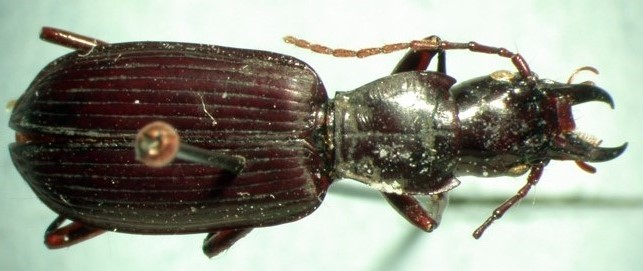

Scientific classification
- Kingdom: Animalia
- Phylum: Arthropoda
- Clade: Pancrustacea
- Class: Insecta
- Order: Coleoptera
- Suborder: Adephaga
- Family: Carabidae
- Genus: Hybothecus
- Species: H. mateui

Binomial name
- Hybothecus mateui Straneo, 1958

= Hybothecus mateui =

Species of beetle

Hybothecus mateui is a species of woodland ground beetle in the family Carabidae. It is found in Bolivia.
