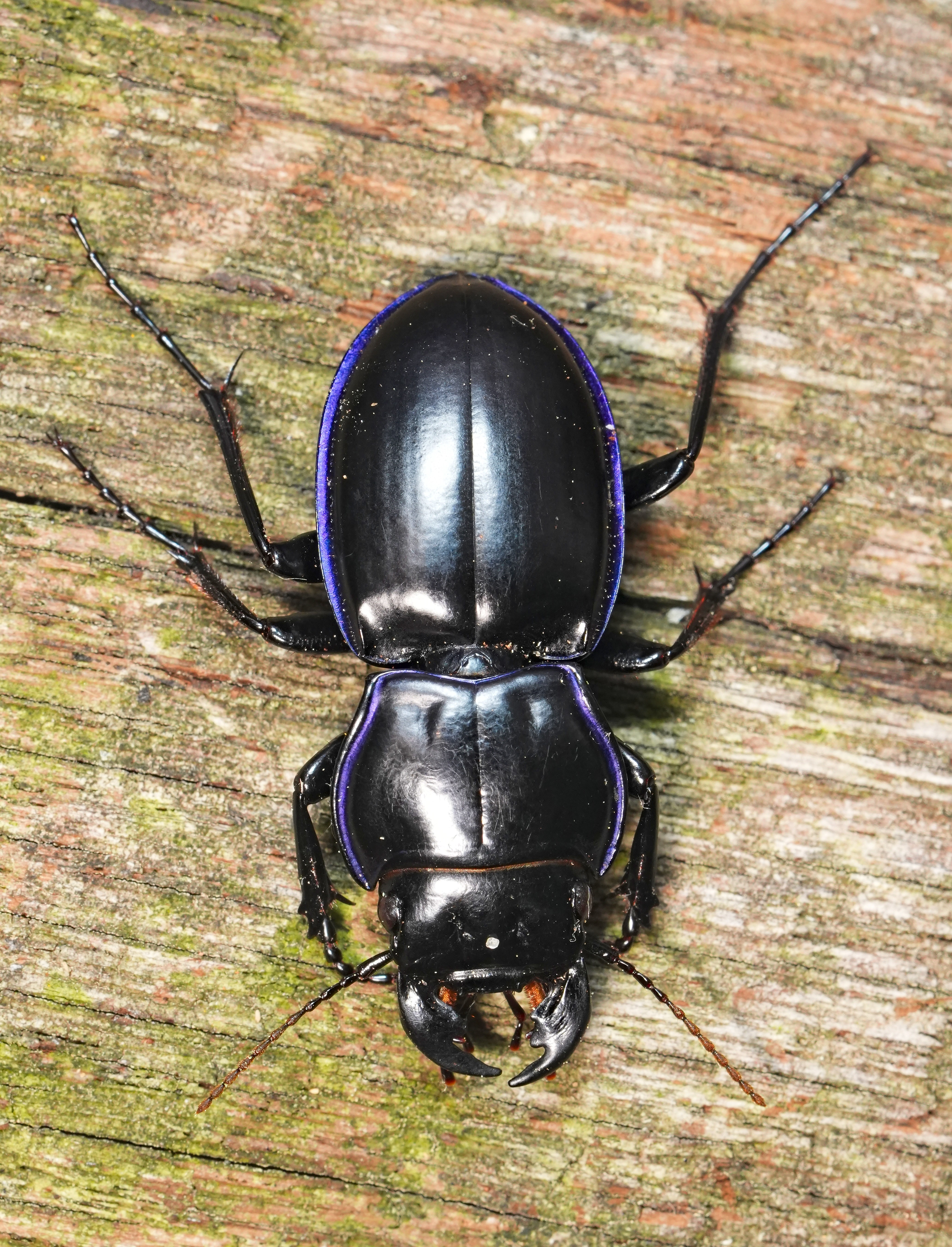
- Dorsal view of an adult Pasimachus depressus

Scientific classification
- Kingdom: Animalia
- Phylum: Arthropoda
- Clade: Pancrustacea
- Class: Insecta
- Order: Coleoptera
- Suborder: Adephaga
- Family: Carabidae
- Genus: Pasimachus
- Species: P. depressus

Binomial name
- Pasimachus depressus (Fabricius, 1787)

= Pasimachus depressus =

Species of beetle

Pasimachus depressus is a species of ground beetle in the family Carabidae. It is found in North America.

== Subspecies ==
These two subspecies belong to the species Pasimachus depressus:

- Pasimachus depressus carolinensis Casey
- Pasimachus depressus depressus
