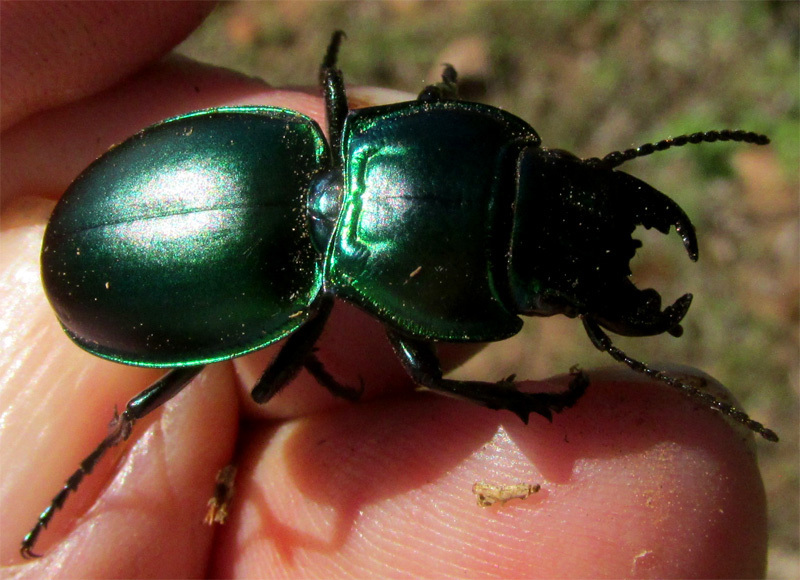

Scientific classification
- Domain: Eukaryota
- Kingdom: Animalia
- Phylum: Arthropoda
- Class: Insecta
- Order: Coleoptera
- Suborder: Adephaga
- Family: Carabidae
- Genus: Pasimachus
- Species: P. mexicanus

Binomial name
- Pasimachus mexicanus G. R. Gray, 1832

Synonyms
- Pasimachus virens Sturm, 1843; Pasimachus coeruleus Bates, 1891

= Pasimachus mexicanus =

Species of beetle

Pasimachus mexicanus is a species of warrior beetle.

== Description ==
Sometimes called the greenish or Mexican warrior beetle in English, the beetle is characterized by its large size, shiny, green color and, in common with other members of Pasimachus, its powerful mandibles and a carnivorous diet.

== Range ==
It occurs on the Mexican Plateau of central Mexico at elevations of 1383 – 2474 meters altitude.

== Behavior ==
The species is brachypterous, thus flightless and limited to walking or running. Adults are mainly nocturnal, and aestivate in the ground during the dry season. Adults are predaceous.

== Habitat ==
Adults are ground-dwelling, during the day usually remaining in burrows dug into the substrate, under stones, or surface debris. However, the individual illustrated in the taxonomy box was found fast-moving across rocky ground of overgrazed, semi-arid scrub populated largely with tree cacti and mesquites. It was at an elevation of ~1900 m (~6200 feet)
