= Hybothecus sculptilis =

Scientific classification
- Kingdom: Animalia
- Phylum: Arthropoda
- Clade: Pancrustacea
- Class: Insecta
- Order: Coleoptera
- Suborder: Adephaga
- Family: Carabidae
- Genus: Hybothecus
- Species: H. sculptilis

Binomial name
- Hybothecus sculptilis Putzeys, 1878

Species of beetle

Hybothecus sculptilis is a species of woodland ground beetle in the family Carabidae. It is found in Mexico and Brazil.
