= Julius Flohr =

German entomologist and banker in Mexico (1837–1896)

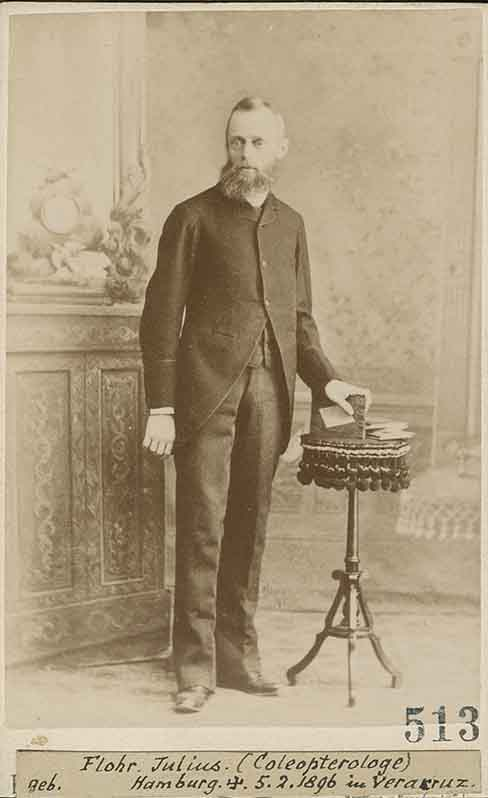
Undated portrait of Flohr in Berlin, held in the collection of the Academy of Natural Sciences, Philadelphia.

Julius Flohr (11 February 1837 – 8 February 1896) was a German banker and entomologist resident in Mexico.

== Early life ==
Flohr was born in Hamburg, in what was then the German Confederation, on 11 February 1837. He was educated there and in England.

== Banking career ==
In 1859, Flohr moved to Mexico City to work as a banker. In 1862, he joined Esteban Benecke & Co., a bank in which he became a life-long partner. Benecke was the Prussian consul and one of Mexico's first bankers.

== Entomological pursuits ==
Flohr retired from day-to-day banking in 1877 and devoted himself to the study of insects, especially beetles. Interest in comparative anatomy remained high following the publication of Darwin's On the Origin of Species, and Flohr's field work was cited extensively in the Biologia Centrali-Americana encyclopedia.

Between 1878 and 1885, British naturalist Henry Walter Bates named several species of North American beetle for Flohr, including

- Bembidion flohri
- Ecteneolus flohri
- Hybothecus flohri

In 1884, Flohr accompanied American zoologist Edward Drinker Cope in Mexico. Cope wrote:

I am indebted to my excellent friend, Dr. Julius Flohr, of the city of Mexico, for a canoe excursion on the lake Xochimilco [...] Here I had an opportunity of seeing the botany and zoology of the very irregular shores, which are so curiously constructed by the art of the natives [...] The ends and shores of the piers are the resting place of innumerable snakes, which can be readily observed from a canoe. The wife of our Indian boatman was particularly acute in detecting these animals before either my friend or myself could see them.

== Death ==
Flohr died in Veracruz on 8 February 1896. (Note: The Deutsche Entomologische Zeitschrift records his date of death as 18 February 1896.) He was eulogized by entomologists George Charles Champion in England and Ernst Gustav Kraatz in Germany. Flohr's collection of insect specimens was bequeathed to the Berlin Zoological Museum.
