= Ecteneolus =

Scientific classification
- Kingdom: Animalia
- Phylum: Arthropoda
- Class: Insecta
- Order: Coleoptera
- Suborder: Polyphaga
- Infraorder: Cucujiformia
- Family: Cerambycidae
- Genus: Ecteneolus
- Species: E. flohri

Binomial name
- Ecteneolus flohri Bates, 1885

Genus of beetles

Ecteneolus flohri is a species of beetle in the family Cerambycidae, and the only species in the genus Ecteneolus. It was described by Henry Walter Bates in 1885 and named for banker and entomologist Julius Flohr.
