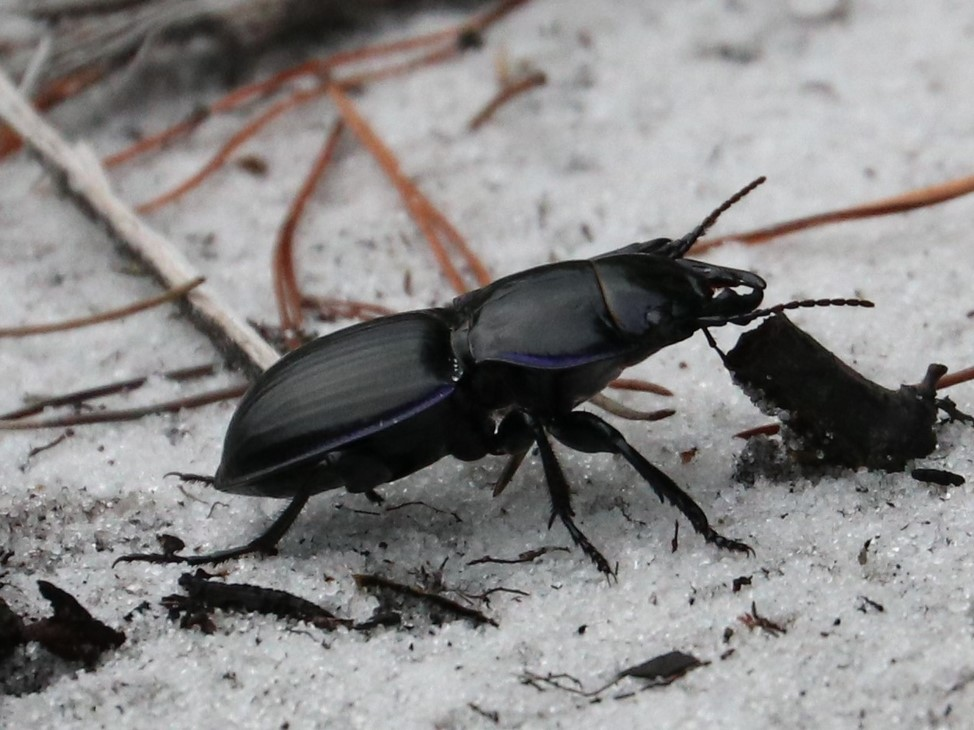

Scientific classification
- Kingdom: Animalia
- Phylum: Arthropoda
- Class: Insecta
- Order: Coleoptera
- Suborder: Adephaga
- Family: Carabidae
- Genus: Pasimachus
- Species: P. strenuus

Binomial name
- Pasimachus strenuus LeConte, 1874

= Pasimachus strenuus =

Species of beetle

Pasimachus strenuus is a species of ground beetle in the family Carabidae. It is found in North America.
