= Hybothecus aequidianus =

Scientific classification
- Kingdom: Animalia
- Phylum: Arthropoda
- Class: Insecta
- Order: Coleoptera
- Suborder: Adephaga
- Family: Carabidae
- Genus: Hybothecus
- Species: H. aequidianus

Binomial name
- Hybothecus aequidianus Moret, 1997

Species of beetle

Hybothecus aequidianus is a species of woodland ground beetle in the family Carabidae. It is found in Ecuador.
