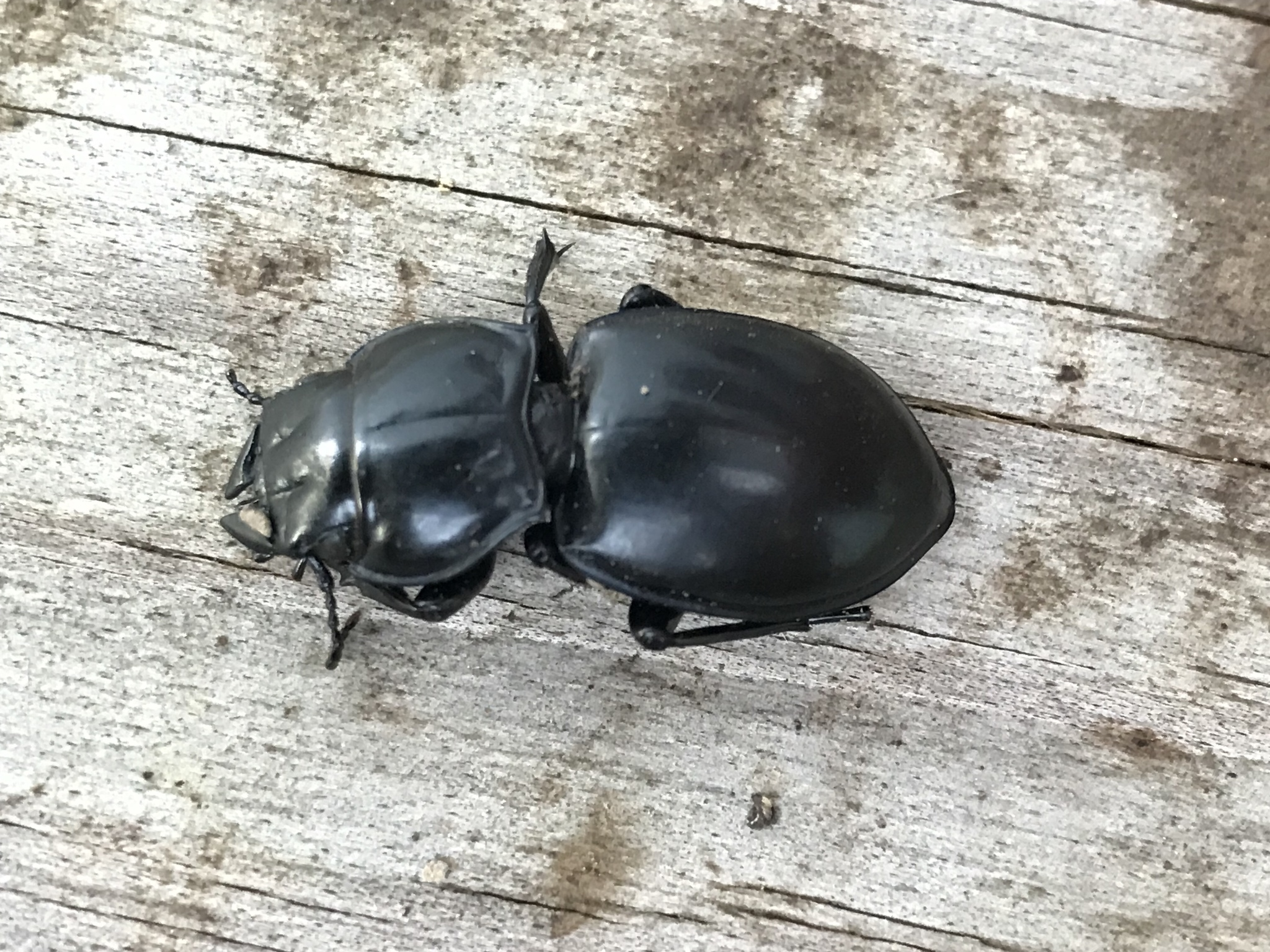

Scientific classification
- Kingdom: Animalia
- Phylum: Arthropoda
- Clade: Pancrustacea
- Class: Insecta
- Order: Coleoptera
- Suborder: Adephaga
- Family: Carabidae
- Genus: Pasimachus
- Species: P. californicus

Binomial name
- Pasimachus californicus Chaudoir, 1850

= Pasimachus californicus =

Species of beetle

Pasimachus californicus, commonly called the California warrior beetle, is a species of ground beetle in the family Carabidae that was described by Maximilien Chaudoir in 1850. It is found in the southern Great Plains and southwestern states of the United States and in Mexico. The beetle is commonly found in mixed oak woodlands. It is a predator that eats a variety of insects, caterpillars, and small invertebrates and is considered a beneficial insect. It is not harmful to humans but may bite if threatened. It has no venom nor is it known to carry human diseases, and the bite is akin to minor pinch.
