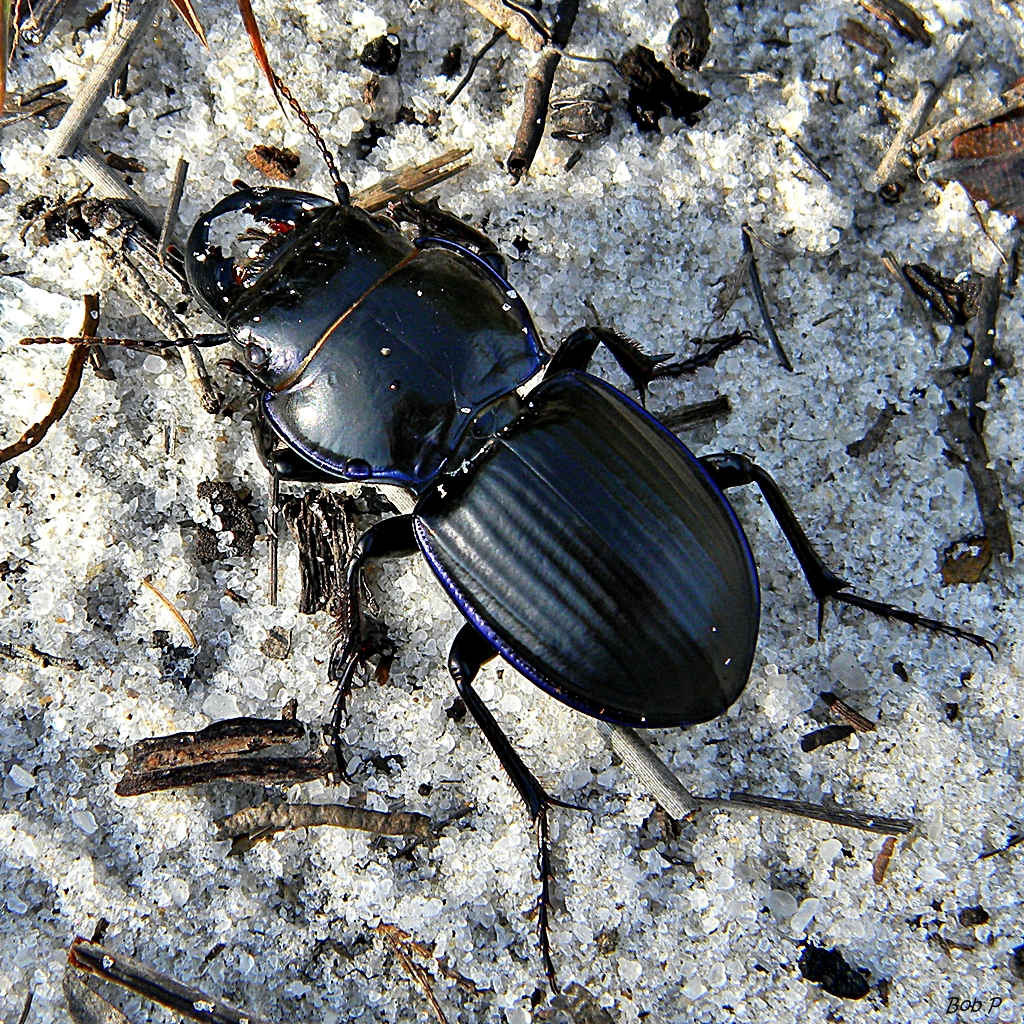

Scientific classification
- Domain: Eukaryota
- Kingdom: Animalia
- Phylum: Arthropoda
- Class: Insecta
- Order: Coleoptera
- Suborder: Adephaga
- Family: Carabidae
- Genus: Pasimachus
- Species: P. sublaevis

Binomial name
- Pasimachus sublaevis (Palisot de Beauvois, 1811)

= Pasimachus sublaevis =

Species of beetle

Pasimachus sublaevis is a species of ground beetle in the family Carabidae. It is found in North America.
