= Hybothecus flohri =

Scientific classification
- Domain: Eukaryota
- Kingdom: Animalia
- Phylum: Arthropoda
- Class: Insecta
- Order: Coleoptera
- Suborder: Adephaga
- Family: Carabidae
- Genus: Hybothecus
- Species: H. flohri

Binomial name
- Hybothecus flohri (Bates, 1882)

Synonyms
- Ophryogaster flohri Bates, 1882; Pterostichus arizonicus Schaeffer, 1910

Species of beetle

Hybothecus flohri is a species of woodland ground beetle in the family Carabidae. It is found in Central America and North America.
