= Cas Oorthuys =

Dutch photographer and designer

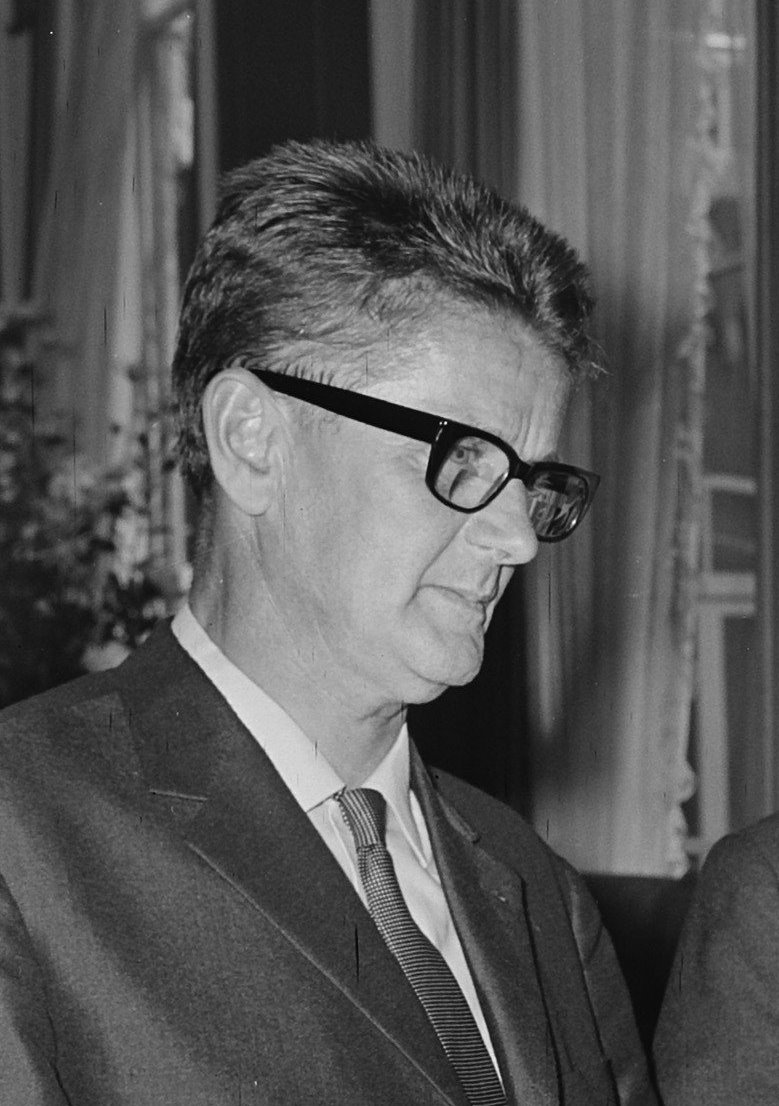
- Oorthuys (1964)
- Born: Casparus Bernardus Oorthuys; 1 November 1908; Leiden
- Died: 22 July 1975 (aged 66); Amsterdam
- Education: School for Architecture, Decorative Arts and Art Crafts, Haarlem
- Known for: Photography
- Notable work: Amsterdam tijdens den hongerwinter
- Movement: The New Photography, De Ondergedoken Camera
- Spouses: 1 November 1908 (m. 1932; div. 1938) Lydia Krienen (m. 1940)
- Awards: 1964 ANWB Prize; 1966 CPNB prize 1971 decorated, Knight of the Order of Orange-Nassau

Casparus Bernardus Oorthuys (1 November 1908 – 22 July 1975), known as Cas Oorthuys, was a Dutch photographer and designer active from the 1930s until the 1970s.

== Education ==
Casparus Bernardus (Cas) Oorthuys, born 1908 in Leiden, was the fourth child and first son of Dorothea Catherina Helena Christina de Stoppelaar (1875–1948) and Reverend Gerardus Oorthuys (1876–1959), who started his career as a pastor in Brakel. In 1909 the family moved to Amsterdam, where from 1921 Oorthuys attended the Amsterdam Lyceum for three years before enrolling in the technical school in the Timorplein in Amsterdam. From 1926 to 1930 he studied architecture at the School for Architecture, Decorative Arts and Art Crafts in Haarlem and, after the closure of this school in 1927, in the architecture department of the Haarlem MTS, during which time he joined the free-thinking Dutch Association of Abstinent Students, and first took up photography.

== Career ==
In 1930 Oorthuys joined the municipality of Amsterdam as a structural engineer and was involved, among other things, in the design of the market halls on the Jan van Galenstraat. In 1932 he, with many others, lost his job as a result of the economic crisis. Unemployed, he came into contact with the Communist Party of Holland, which he joined. Oorthuys sought work as a graphic designer and photographer and with the painter Jo Voskuil started an advertising agency OV 20 ("Oorthuys-Vos 20") in 1932, which ceased business in 1935. He was a member of Nederlandsche Vereeniging voor Ambachts- en Nijverheidskunst (V.A.N.K.) the Dutch Association for Craft and Craft Art.

Oorthuys was involved with and a member of various left-wing organisations in his field. In 1936 he became a permanent photographer at De Arbeiderspers. He produced photography and graphics for communist and anti-fascist organisations; and in the tradition of "workers' photography" he documented poverty, police violence, the unemployed, homeless people and evictions for magazines, book illustrations and book covers and exhibitions.

== Resistance work during World War II ==
During the war, Oorthuys helped forge identity papers and photographed clandestinely for De Ondergedoken Camera (the Underground Camera; see below) to document the activities of the German occupiers, and also the awful Hongerwinter, the Dutch famine of 1944–45. During the postwar recovery, he recorded the Nuremberg war crimes trials and the rebuilding of his homeland.

On 5 August 1938 Oorthuys had divorced teacher Gezina Broerse (1910–1997), whom he had married on 31 August 1932 and with whom he had two children. He married scriptwriter Lydia Krienen on 3 April 1940, just before the war broke out in May. During the Occupation, Oorthuys became involved in the Personal Identification Centre established in 1942 and made passport photos for fake ID cards, while earning a bare living on an assignment from Contact publishing company for a book about agriculture. In May 1944, when he took ration cards to the architect J.J. van der Linden and others in hiding, he was arrested by the Germans and imprisoned in camp Amersfoort. Unexpectedly, he was released again in August, presumably at the interposition of Nico de Haas who, despite having been with Oorthuys one of the founders in 1936 of the ‘photo and film’ group of the Association for the Defense of Cultural Law (Bond van Kunstenaars ter Verdediging van de Kulturele Rechten, BKVK) in preparation of the anti-fascist exhibition De Olympiade Onder Dictatuur (DOOD), had quickly worked up to become a prominent Dutch SS man after the German invasion.

On release, Oorthuys connected with De Ondergedoken Camera ("the Underground Camera"), formed around Dolle Dinsdag on the initiative of the German emigrant Fritz Kahlenberg and the former soldier Tonny van Renterghem; ‘Underground’ because the Nazi occupiers declared a complete ban on "photographing, filming, drawing, and displaying persons and things in any other way outside of domestic spaces" from 20 November 1944. The group photographed in any way they could, keeping cameras concealed and shooting 'from the hip'; consequently the quality of the imagery is distinguished by its haphazard nature; often with tilted, uncentered framing and other accidental effects. Their aim was initially to document the Allies’ liberation which was longer in coming than hoped, and instead they recorded a severe winter of hunger and resistance in photos that have become the image of the German occupation, especially Cas Oorthuys’ picture of a woman with a piece of bread in close-up. A variation was published on the cover of Amsterdam tijdens den hongerwinter (‘Amsterdam During the Winter of Hunger’) published by Contact / De Bezige Bij, in 1947, while the now more famous image from this series reached an audience of nine million through the 1955 exhibition and publication The Family of Man.

== Post-war ==
After the war Oorthuys maintained the left-wing convictions that had prompted his joining the worker-photographer movement Vereeniging van Arbeiders-Fotografen in 1932, and with his equally idealistic friends Carel Blazer, Eva Besnyö, and Emmy Andriesse, formed the Vereniging van Beoefenaars der Gebonden Kunsten, the GKf, on 1 September 1945.

In keeping with his convictions, from January until March 1947, Oorthuys, accompanied by his writer the educationalist Albert de la Court, travelled through Java and Borneo in Indonesia commissioned by ABC-Press and the publishing house Contact. In July 1947 the resulting book Een staat in wording (A Nascent State), promoted a peaceful solution to the Indonesian struggle for independence, and reviews reveal its impact on changing attitudes to the colony as the Netherlands tried to re-exert its control, but before the book appeared, the violent Indonesian National Revolution was in full swing.

From 1945 to 1975 he produced numerous books and reports on the post-war reconstruction in Dutch industry, agriculture, regions and cities and undertook reportage in Indonesia (1947), photographed the Peace Conference in Paris (1948), and in 1950 produced reportage in West Irian.

With Lydia, Oorthuys had three children: daughters Fenna and Hansje, and lastly a son, Frank, in 1960. Photography became a family concern; during the summer holidays from 1951 they travelled to make 28 photo pocketbook in a series for Contact-Photo books, starting with Bonjour Paris with a cover by Jan van Keulen, each on a different country, promoting tourism for a now more prosperous Dutch population. The compact books were designed around the square format of the Rolleiflex that Oorthuys favoured and several were marketed by foreign publishers in English, French and German language editions.

During this period he also designed five postage stamps (1951) and two more in 1964. On each of the five stamps, a portrait of a child, among them his own daughter Hansje, is montaged against the background of a typical aspect of the Netherlands, showing the (housing) construction and industry. For the Belgian Ministry of Information, he covered the Congo in 1952, with further reports on cattle raising in Jersey (1954), followed by stories on Macedonia, Serbia and Spain (1955).

== Some photographs ==
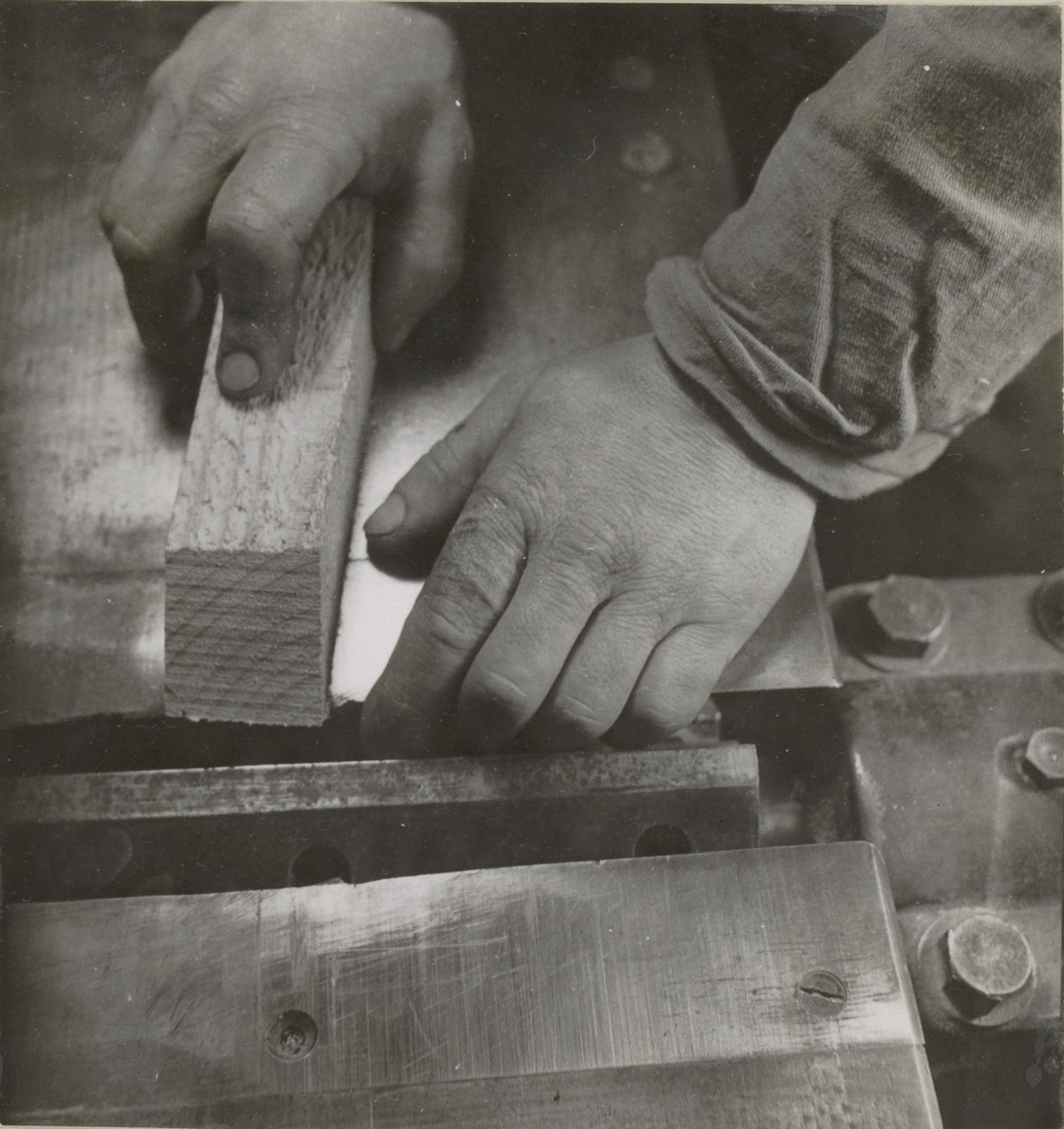
Jointer

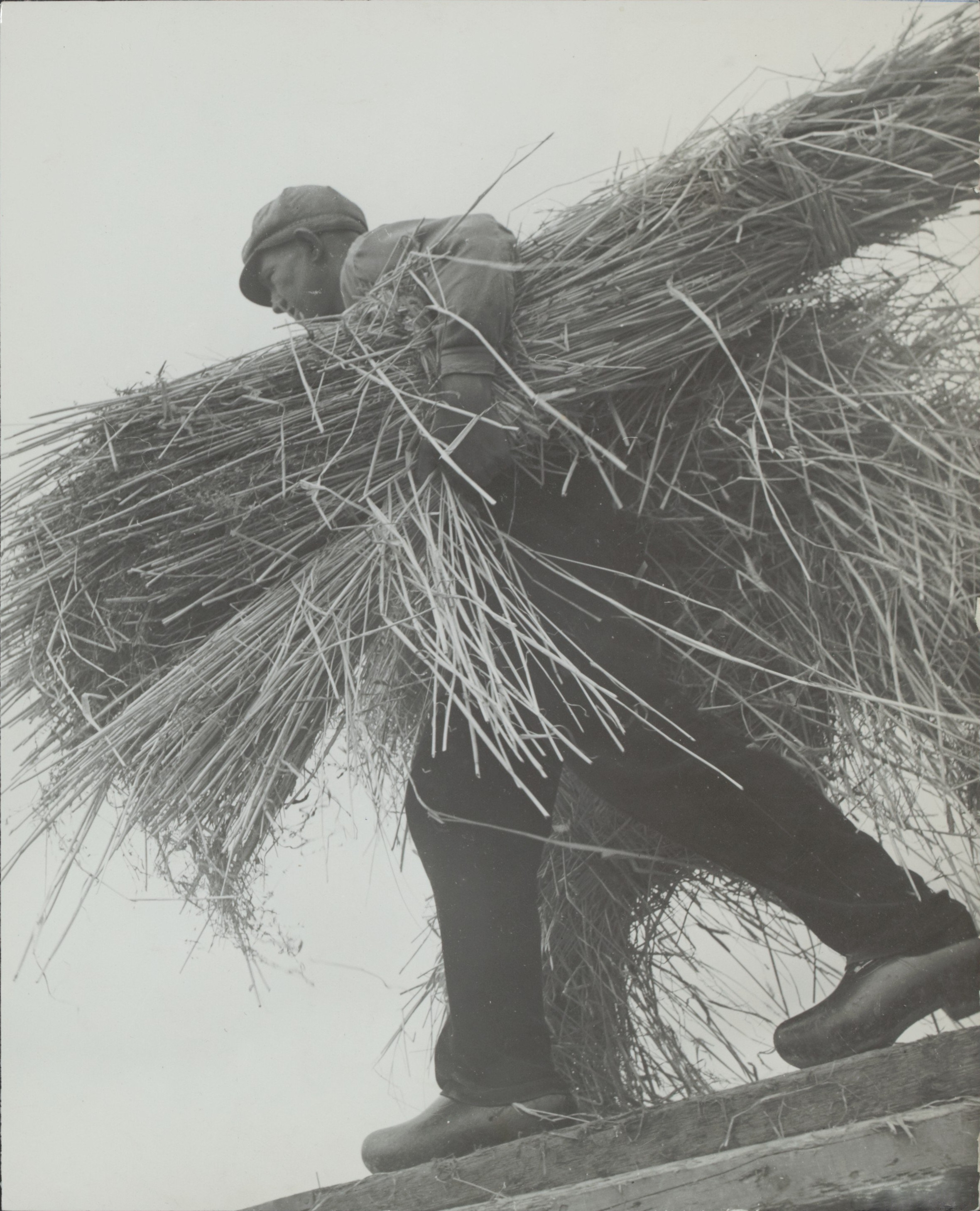
Walcheren (1945)

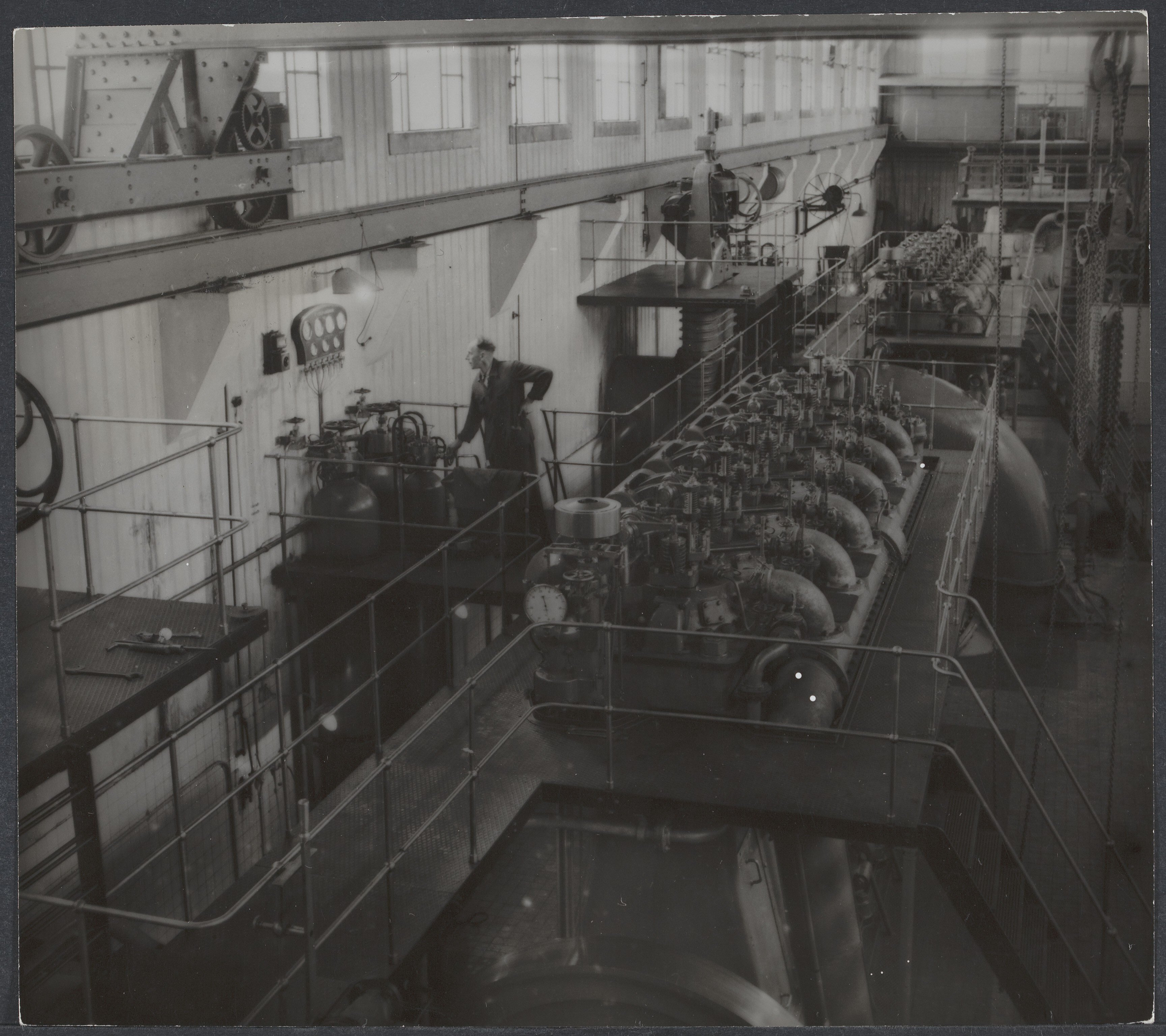
Wieringermeerpolder (1945)

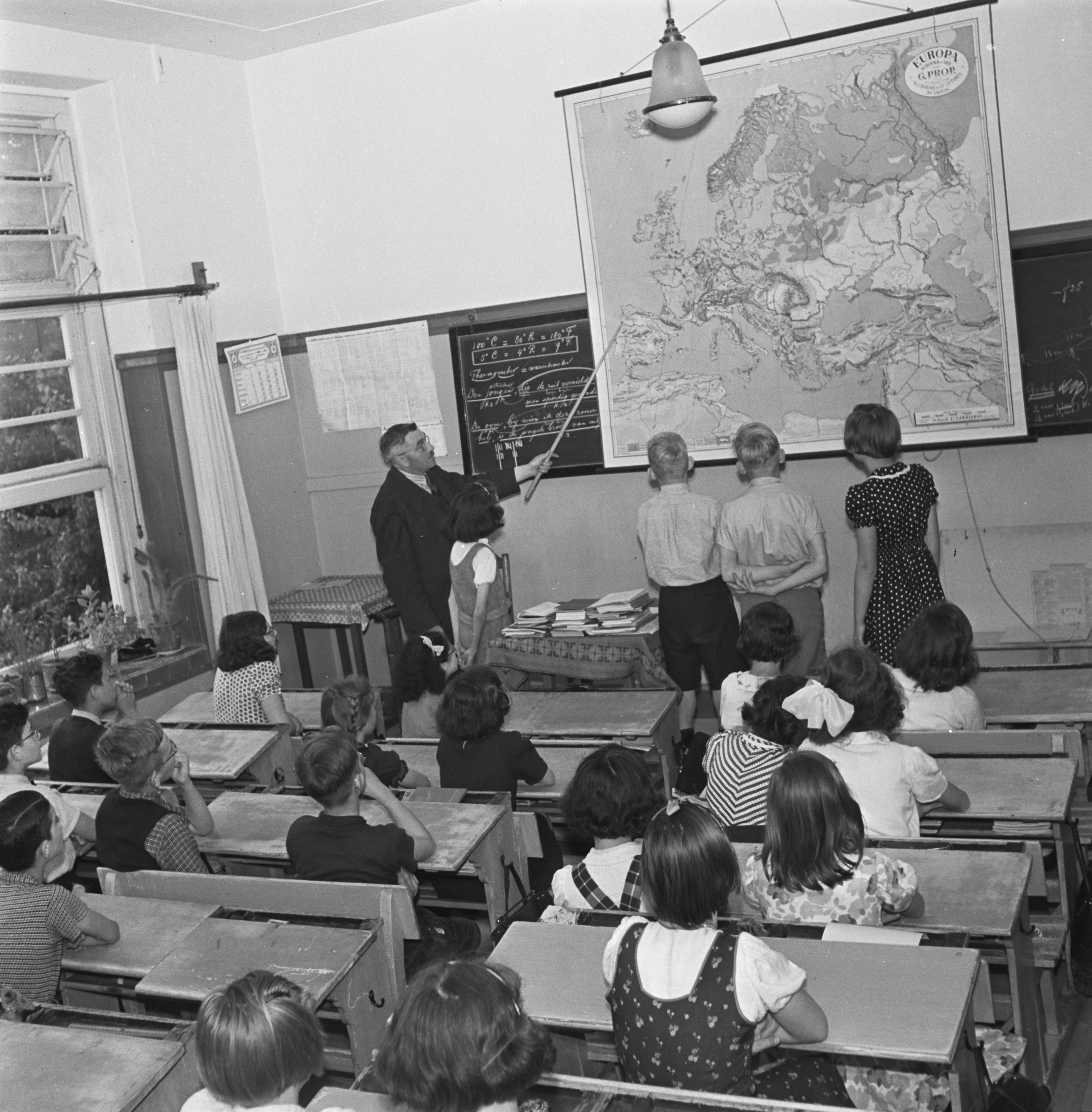
School class (1946)

== Dutch stamps 1951 ==
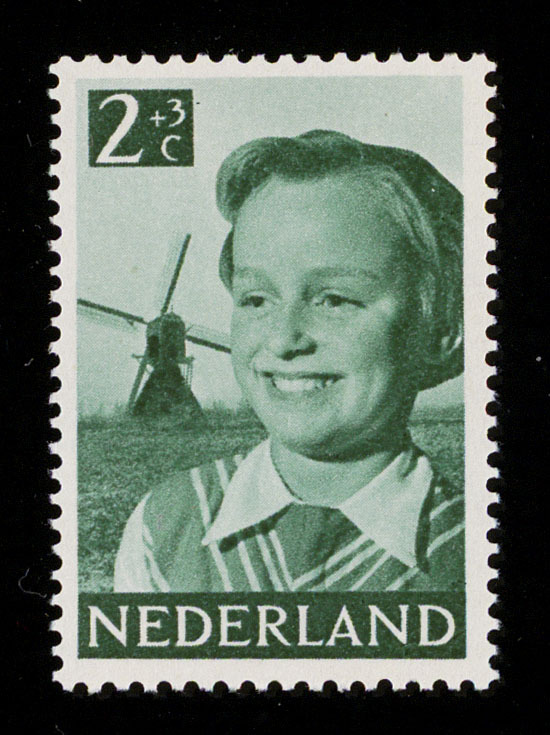

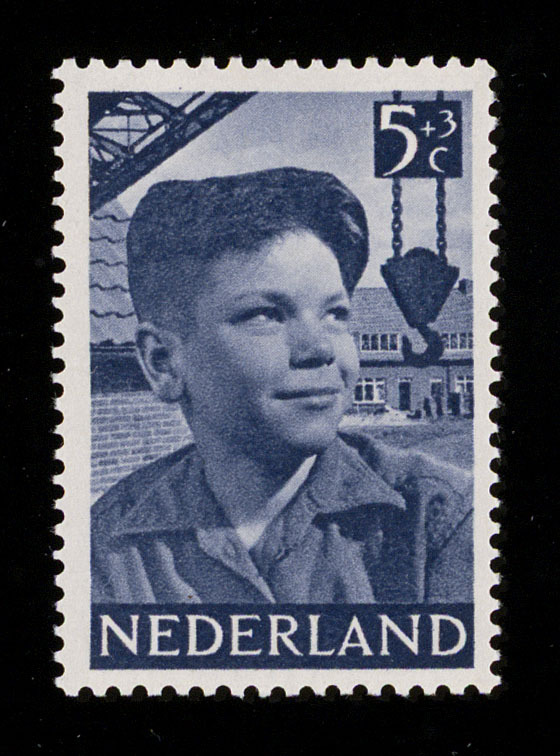

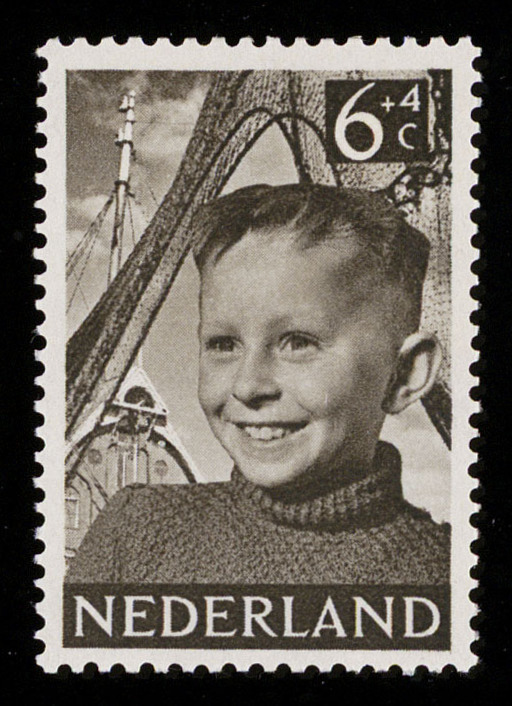

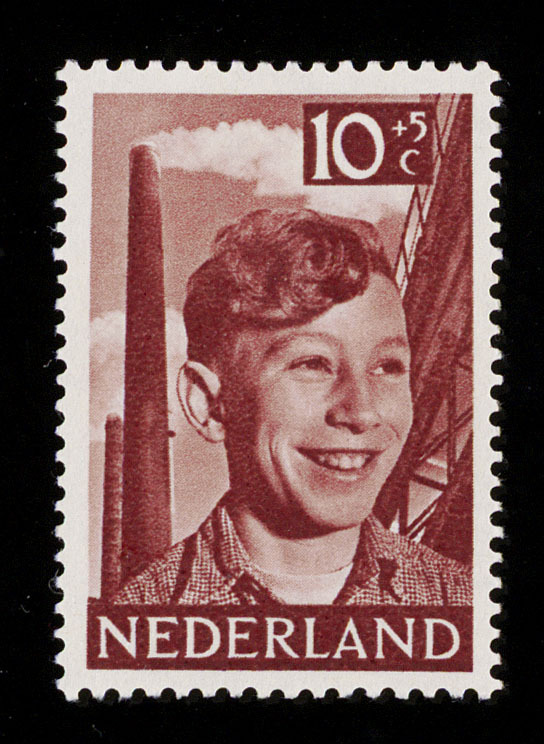

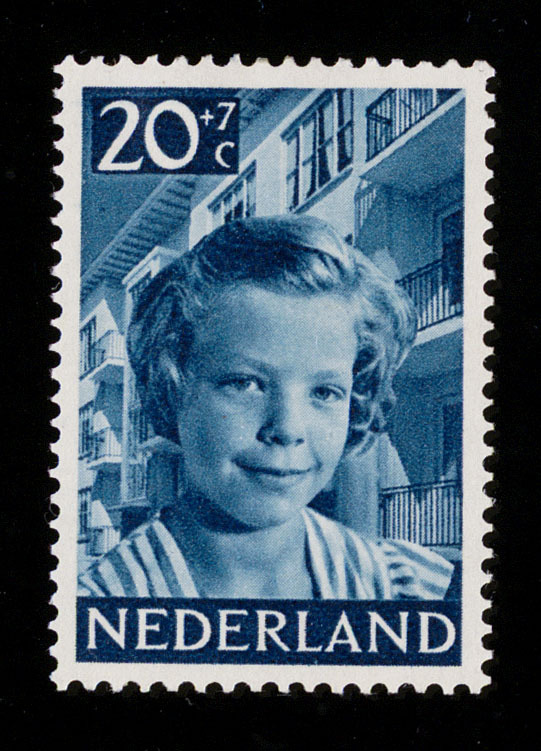

== Awards and legacy ==
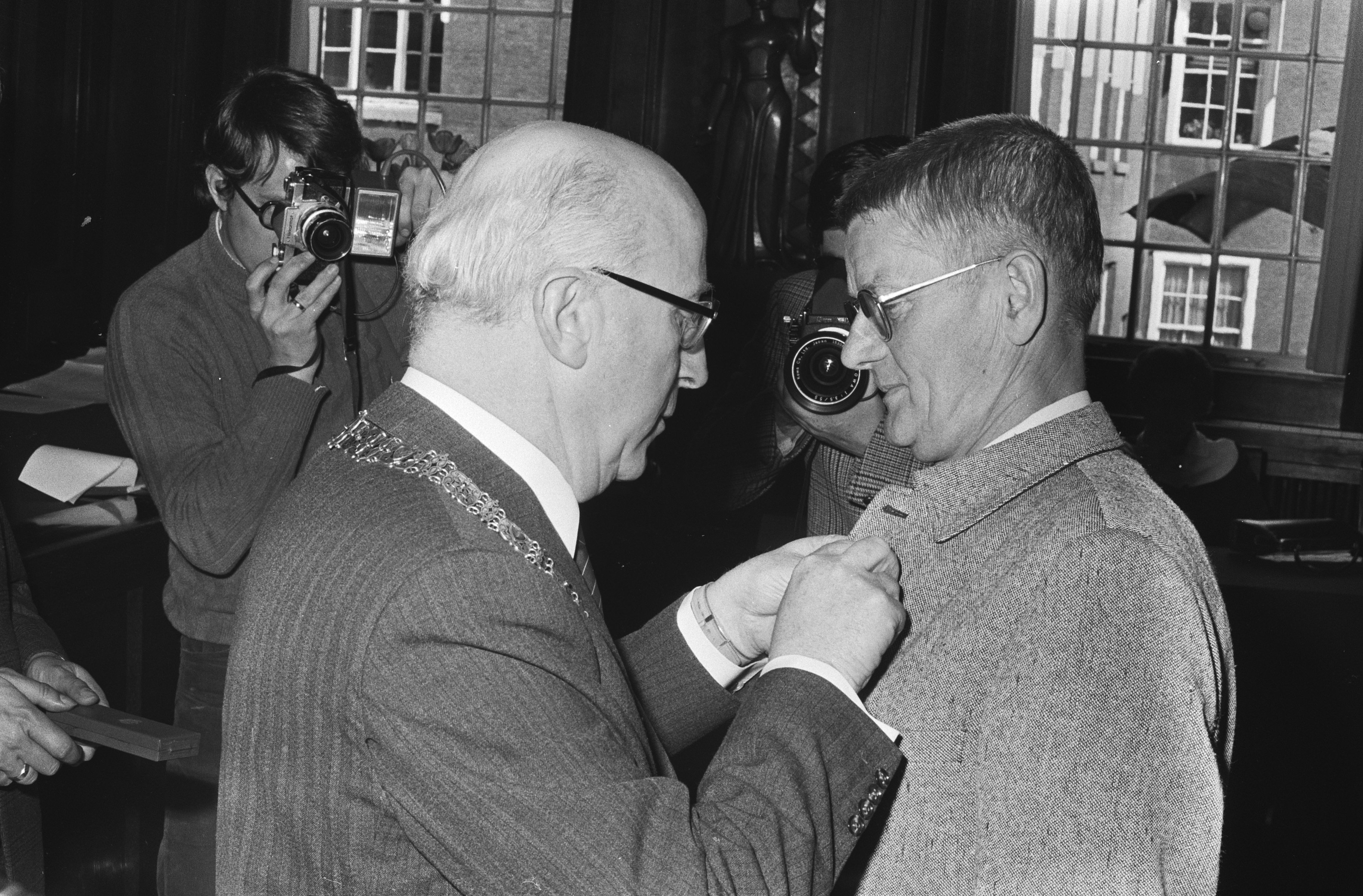
Oorthuys decorated with Knight of the Order of Orange-Nassau in 1971

- 1964 ANWB Prize for the book Amsterdam onze hoofdstad
- 1966 CPNB prize for the book Netherlands
- 1969 the Sledelijk Museum, Amsterdam, marks Oorthuys' 60th anniversary with an exhibition and book
- 1971 decorated, Knight of the Order of Orange-Nassau
- 1975 postage stamp commemorating the anniversary of liberation

Oorthuys died unexpectedly on 22 July 1975 in Amsterdam, at 66, having only three months earlier designed a postage stamp on the occasion of the 30th anniversary of the Liberation.

At the end of his career he left 500,000 pictures, a huge archive faithfully maintained by his wife Lydia, who sold its imagery to a variety of clients before she donated the entire collection to Nederlands Fotomuseum when she was in her seventies.

== Exhibitions ==
=== Solo exhibitions ===
- 1969: Stedelijk Museum, Amsterdam (NL)
- 1970: Portraits, Haags Museum, Den Haag (NL)
- 1970: Hoogovens (NL)
- 1970: Psychologisch Laboratory, Nijmegen (NL)
- 1970: Kontrasten, Haags Museum, Den Haag (NL)
- 1970: Mensen-People, In de Prinsetun, Leeuwarden (NL)
- 1970: Kunstcentrum, Berge (NL)
- 1974: Galerie Fiolet, Amsterdam (NL)
- 1975: Amsterdam Historisch Museum, (NL)
- 2003: 1 Aug – 16 Aug, Cas Oorthuys, Saló Juvenil-Biblioteca (ES)
- 2003: 6 Sep – 28 Sep, Cas Oorthuys, Sala Plens de l'Ajuntament de Petra (ES)
- 2003: 13 Nov – 4 Dec, Cas Oorthuys, Sala d'exposicions del Roser (ES)
- 2003/4: 12 Dec – 4 Jan, Cas Oorthuys, Casal de ca s'Hereu (ES)
- 2004: 28 May – 29 Aug, Cas Oorthuys, foam Fotografiemuseum, Amsterdam (NL)
- 2006: 18 Jan – 5 Mar, Fotografías Madrid, Mayo 1955; Cas Oorthuys, Fundación Carlos de Amberes (ES)
- 2007: 20 Feb – 19 Dec, Fotografías Madrid, Mayo 1955; Cas Oorthuys, Fundación Carlos de Amberes (ES)
- 2018/19: 9 September: Sep – 1 Jan, Cas Oorthuys: Contacts, Rotterdam, Nederlands Fotomuseum (NL)
- 2023/24: 16 Jun – 14 Jan, Cas Oorthuys: Verzetsfotograaf, Verzetsmuseum, Amsterdam (NL)

=== Group exhibitions ===
- 1937 Stedelijk Museum, Amsterdam (NL)
- 1953 Museum of Modern Art, New York (US)
- 1954 Subjektive Fotografie 2, Saarbriicken (DE)
- 1957 Biennale di Fotografia, Venezia (IT)
- 1971 Mensen-People, Meyhuis, Helmond (NL)
- 1971: Mensen-People, Moscow (USSR)
- 1979 Haags Gemeentemuseum, Den Haag (NL)
- 2002/3: 10 Nov – 12 Jan, Zwarte Rook: Fotografie en steenkool in de twintigste eeuw, Netherlands Photo Museum (NL)
- 2003: 20 Sep – 19 Oct 60 Exhibitions: Breda Photo, Breda Photo (NL)
- 2003: 29 Aug – 26 Oct, Rare Snuiters, De Nieuwe Kerk (NL)
- 2003/4: 19 Oct – 18 Jan, Licht, lucht en ruimte – Wonen in de jaren vijftig: Cas Oorthuys Jan Versnel, De Zonnehof - centrum voor moderne kunst (NL)
- 2004: 7 Feb – 13 Mar, Onbedoelde Fotografie, ACF Amsterdams Centrum voor Fotografie (NL)
- 2003/4: 12 Dec – 23 May, Foto's van Vijftig, Stedelijk Museum De Lakenhal (NL)
- 2004: 18 Sep – 5 Dec, Wegkijken: Foto's uit het Spaarnestad Fotoarchief, De Hallen (NL)
- 2004/5: 4 Sep – 9 Jan, Paris was great!: Dutch photographers in Paris 1945–1965, Stedelijk Museum Schiedam (NL)
- 2005: 10 Feb – 22 May, La Photographie à l'épreuve, IAC - Institut d'art contemporain (FR)
- 2005: 14 May – 12 Jun, Made in Holland, Dexia FotoFestival Naarden:
- 2005: 22 May – 11 Sep 1945 - Im Blick der Fotografie. Kriegsende und Neuanfang, LWL-Museum (DE) FotoFestival NaardenNL
- 2006: 8 Sep – 3 Dec The Street: Pioneers of 20th-Century Photography from the Rijksmuseum's photo collection, Van Gogh Museum (NL)
- 2007: 19 Apr – 26 Aug, Dutch Eyes, Netherlands Photo Museum (NL)
- 2008: 22 Mar – 22 Jun, The Van Zoetendaal Collection, Fotomuseum Den Haag (NL)
- 2014: 14 Sep 2013 – 5 Jan, White: Photography, Art, Design, Fashion, Film, Netherlands Photo Museum (NL)
- 2015: 5 Feb – 14 Mar, Mid-Century Dutch: Vintage Photographs by Dutch Artists, Keith de Lellis Gallery (US)
- 2015: 24 Jan – 24 May, Rotterdam in the Picture: 175 Years of Photography in Rotterdam, Netherlands Photo Museum (NL)
- 2016: 16 Mar – 19 Jun, Strange and Familiar: Britain as Revealed by International Photographers, curated by Martin Parr, Barbican Art Gallery (GB)
- 2017: 9 Sep 2016 – 22 Jan, Der Rhein und die Fotografie 2016-1853, LVR LandesMuseum Bonn (DE)
- 2017: 25 Nov 2016 – 29 May, Strange and Familiar: Britain as Revealed by International Photographers, Curated by Martin Parr, Manchester Art Gallery (GB)
- 2017: 20 May – 20 Aug, Spring Tide: Van Zoetendaal & The Collection, Netherlands Photo Museum (NL)
- 2017: 20 May – 3 Sep, Spring Tide: Van Zoetendaal & The Collection, Netherlands Photo Museum (NL)
- 2018: 3 Mar – 23 Sep, From Muscle Power to Robot Resistance, Museum Helmond (NL)
- 2018: 20 Jan – 9 Dec, The Collection Illuminated by Charlotte Dumas: Oorthuys with Martien Coppens, Richard Tepe and Ed van der Elsken, Netherlands Photo Museum (NL)
- 2019, 15 Sep 2018 – 13 Jan, The Mix | Dutch Photographers: Past & Present, Netherlands Photo Museum (NL)
- Ongoing: The Family of Man, UNESCO Memory of the World, Steichen Collections, Clervaux Castle (LU)

== Publications ==
- Oorthuys, Cas (1947), The Netherlands: seen by the tourist = Nederland: zoals de toerist het ziet, Contact
- Oorthuys, C.; Brusse, J. (1951), Bonjour Paris, bonsoir Paris, au revoir Paris: Parijse begroetingen, Contact
- Oorthuys, C.; Cocheret, C. A.; Aero-photo Nederland (1952), This is Rotterdam, Contact
- Oorthuys, Cas (1958), This is Brussels and the World Exhibition, Cassirer
- Oorthuys, Cas (1970), Het laatste jaar, 1944–45: een verslag in foto's over onderdrukking en bevrijding, Contact
- Vries-Kruyt, T. de; Kretschmar, Vivienne van; Oorthuys, Cas (1971), Small ship, great sea: the life story of a mongoloid boy, Collins, ISBN 978-0-00-460201-1
- Oorthuys, Cas; Alings, Wim (1969), Mensen: People. Een fotoboek/A book of photographs van Cas Oorthuys, Contact
- Oorthuys, Cas; Alings, Wim (1969), Peoplevan Cas Oorthuys.English approximations by James Brockway, Contact
- Oorthuys, Cas (1981), Oxford in focus, Cassirer, ISBN 978-0-85181-100-0
- Oorthuys, Cas (1992), Guaranteed real Dutch, Congo, Uitgeverij Duo/Duo, ISBN 978-90-72971-11-1
- Oorthuys, Cas; Thys van den Audenaerde, Dirk F. E; Creemers-Palmers, M (1992), Mensen aan de stroom: reisimpressies van Cas Oorthuys in Belgisch-Kongo, 1959: foto-album, Museum-Tervuren
- Oorthuys, Cas; Bool, Flip; Raaff, Henk (2004), Cas Oorthuys: Amsterdam, B. Lubberhuizen, ISBN 978-90-5937-063-0
- Oorthuys, Cas; Jong, Joop de; Mulder, Toni; Suermondt, Rik (2001), Cas Oorthuys, onderweg: Europa, 1945-1965, Contact Amsterdam, ISBN 978-90-254-6321-2
- Oorthuys, Cas; Vriens, Jacques (2000), Allemensen! = everyman!, translated by Kleijwegt, Gerrit, Rotterdam Stichting Uitgeverij Duo/Duo, ISBN 978-90-72971-57-9
