= Emmy Andriesse =

Dutch photographer

- Portrait by Eva Besnyö.
- Born: Emmy Eugenie Andriesse; 14 January 1914; The Hague, Netherlands
- Died: 20 February 1953 (aged 39); Amsterdam, Netherlands
- Occupation: Photographer
- Known for: De Ondergedoken Camera(The Underground Camera)
- Spouse: Dick Elffers

Emmy Eugenie Andriesse (14 January 1914 – 20 February 1953) was a Dutch photographer best known for her work with the Amsterdam Underground Camera group (De Ondergedoken Camera) during World War II.

== Early life and education ==
Emmy Andriesse was the only child of liberal Jews Abraham Andriesse and Else Fuld, both working in textile companies. At age fifteen, she lost her mother, and since her father traveled internationally for work, she was raised by several aunts.

From 1932 to 1937, after high school, Andriesse studied advertising design at the Academy of Fine Arts in The Hague founded in 1929 by designer Gerrit Kiljan. At the academy she belonged to a group of students around left-wing designer Paul Schuitema. She attended an experimental class taught by Paul Schuitema and Gerrit Kiljan, where she learnt photography and the use of photographs in posters, advertising and newspaper articles. In her final years of study, between 1935 and 1937, she lived in Voorburg in a 'community house' together with a group of politically conscious fellow students. Amongst the 15 or so residents were photographer Hans Wolf and academics Eva Loeb, Hans (Johanna) IJzerman and Lex Metz. In this environment Andriesse and her friends came into contact with International Red Aid and various anti-fascist artists' organizations. Andriesse was a member of Nederlandsche Vereeniging voor Ambachts- en Nijverheidskunst (V.A.N.K.) the Dutch Association for Craft and Craft Art. Via this association Andriesse was involved in organizing the photo exhibition foto '37 in the Stedelijk Museum in Amsterdam, together with Carel Blazer and Cas Oorthuys.

== War years and the 'Underground Camera' ==
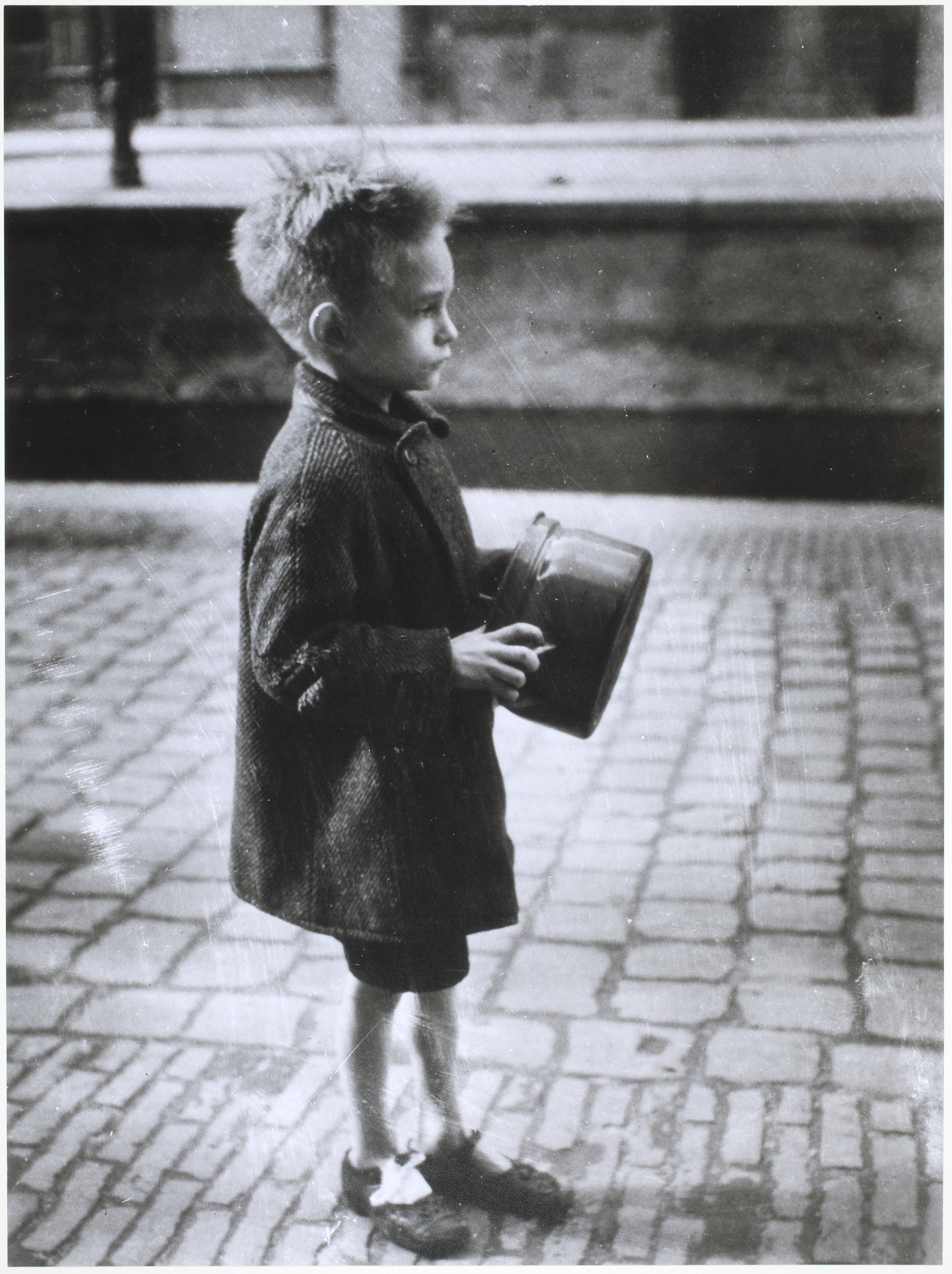
Emmy Andriesse: Boy with pan, 1944-1945.

In June 1941 Andriesse married graphic designer and visual artist Dick Elffers (a gentile with whom she had two sons, one who died young), but as a Jew during the Nazi occupation Andriesse was no longer able to publish and she was forced into hiding. At the end of 1944, with the assistance of the anthropologist Arie de Froe she forged an identity card and re-engaged in everyday life, joining a group of photographers, including Cas Oorthuys and Charles Breijer, working clandestinely as De Ondergedoken Camera. The photos that Andriesse made under very difficult conditions of famine in Amsterdam, include Boy with pan, The Gravedigger and Kattenburg Children are documents of hunger, poverty and misery during the occupation in the "winter of hunger" of 1944-1945.

The photographs made during that period by De Ondergedoken Camera (The Underground Camera) group, including those by Andriesse, were recognized on 17 April 2025 as Dutch documentary world heritage by the Dutch UNESCO Committee.

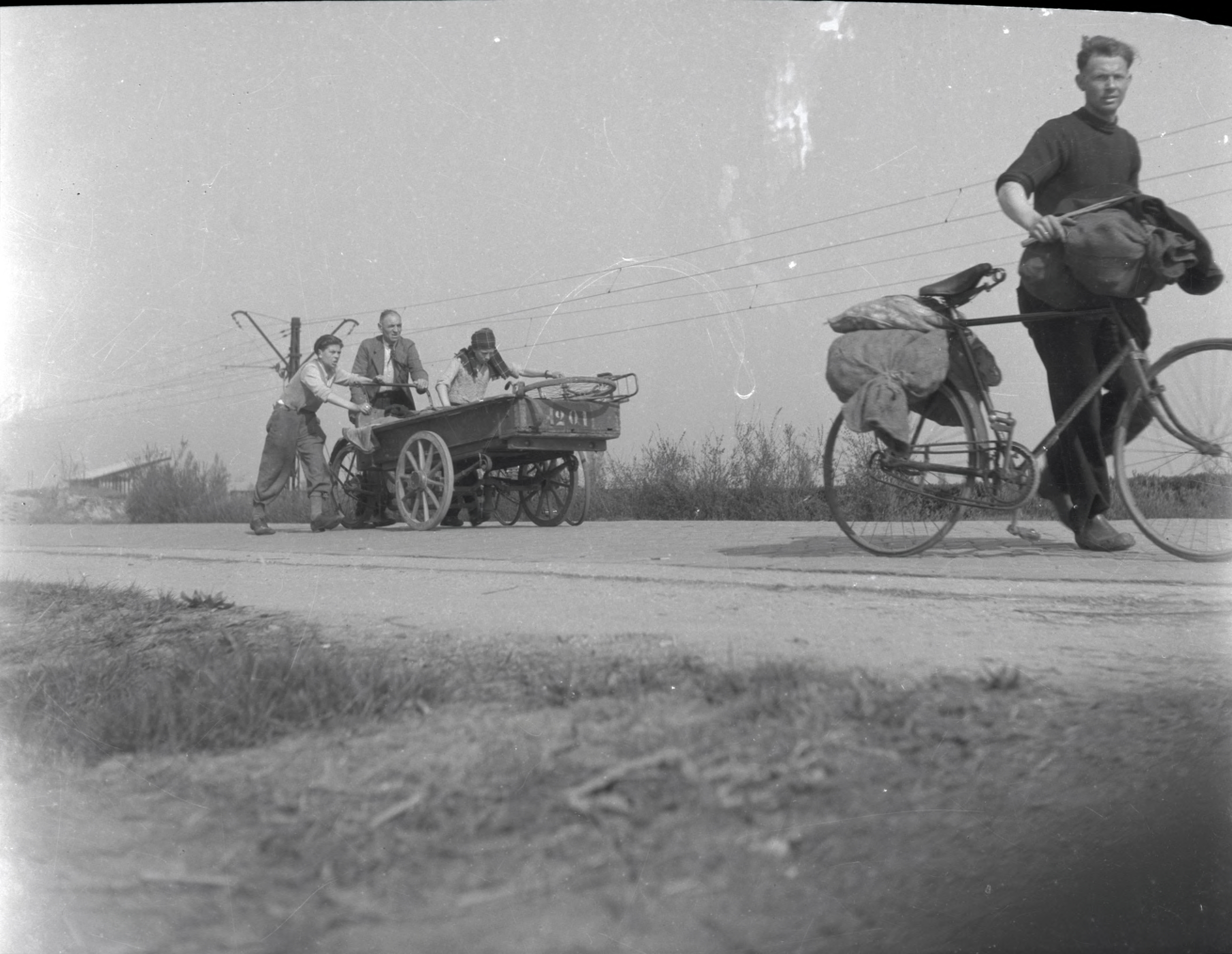
Dutch famine of 1944–1945. Searching for food on a hunger expedition.

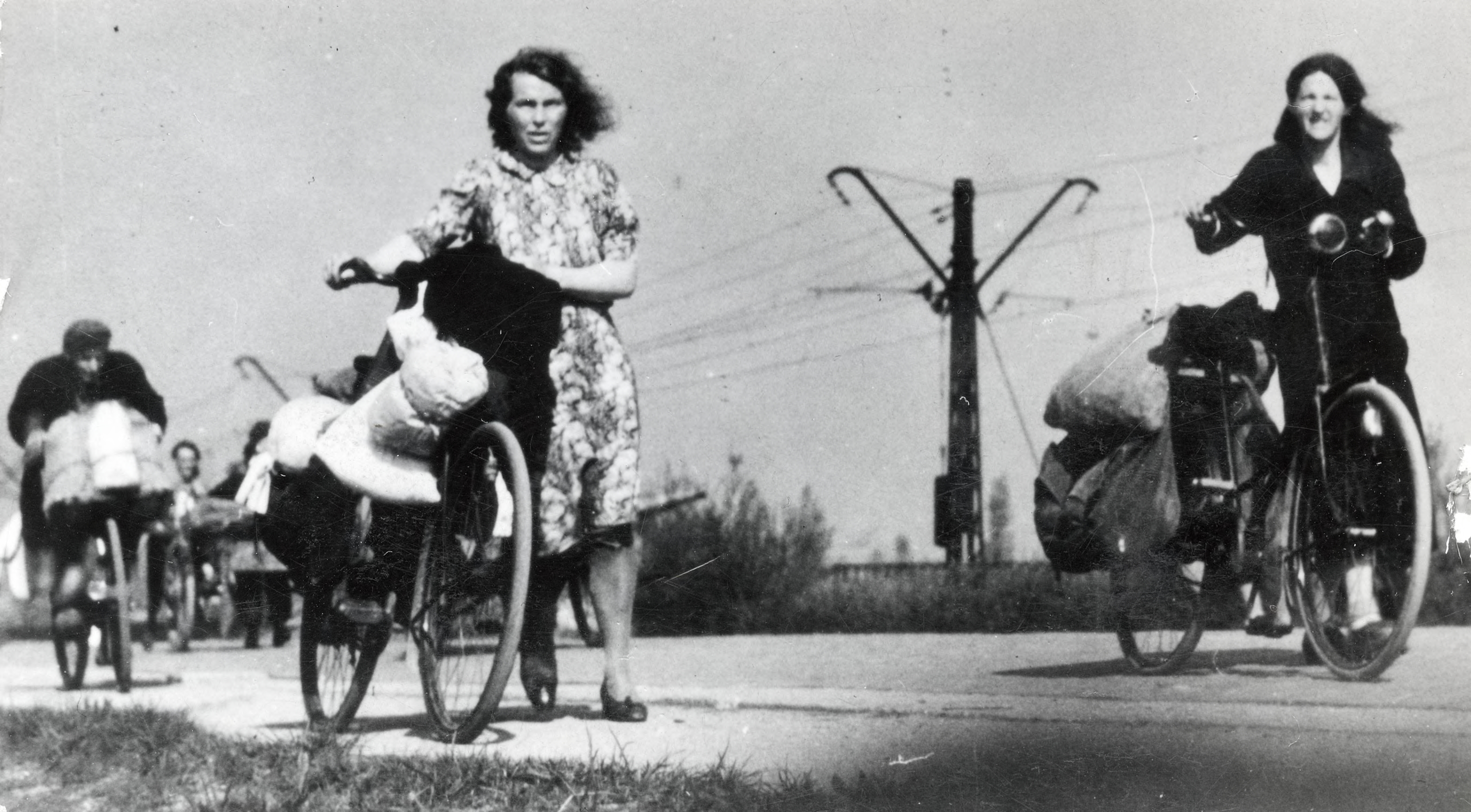
Dutch famine of 1944–1945. Searching for food on a hunger expedition.

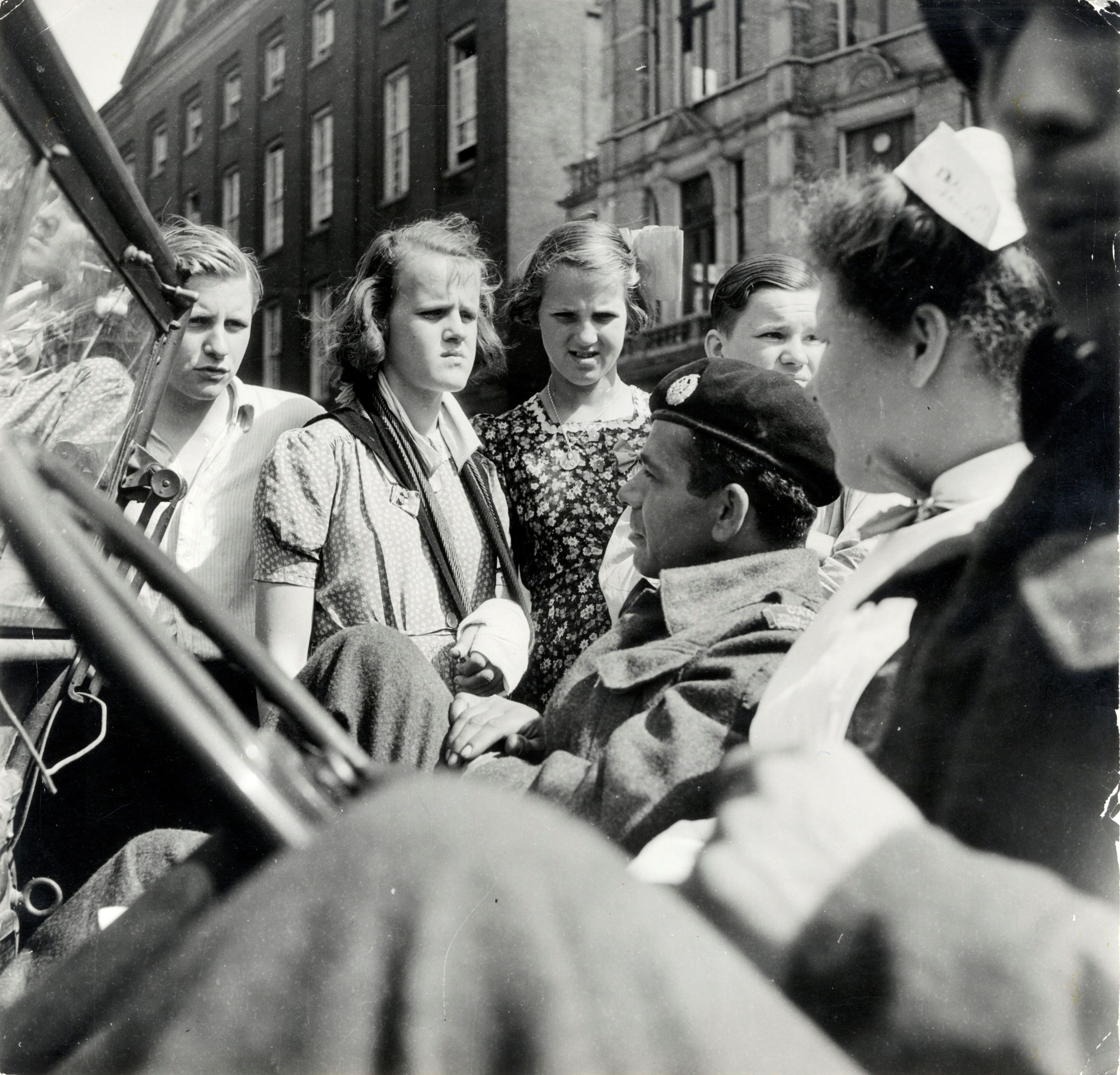
Children meet a liberator, Amsterdam, 1945.

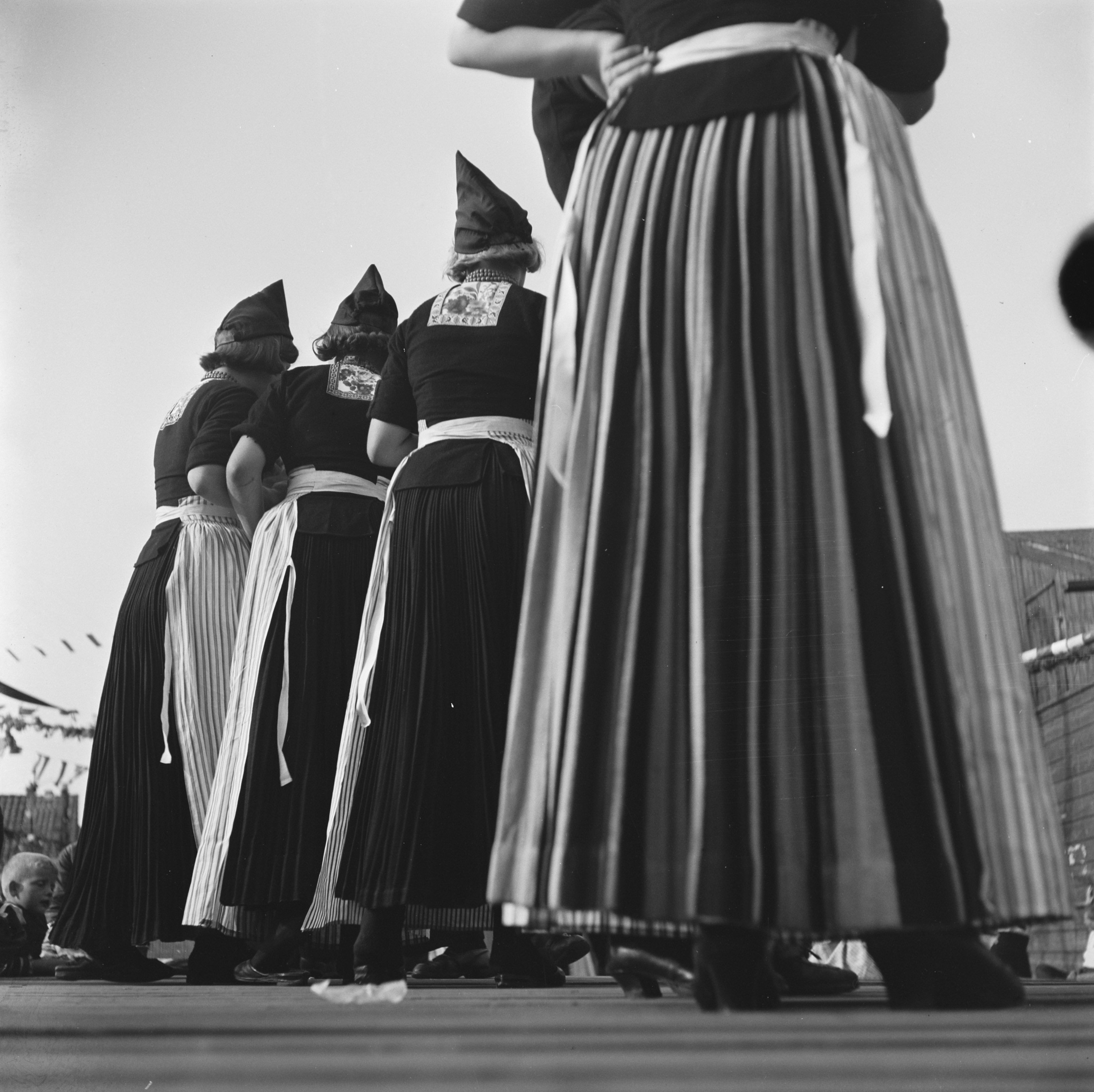
Volendam after the war, July 1945.
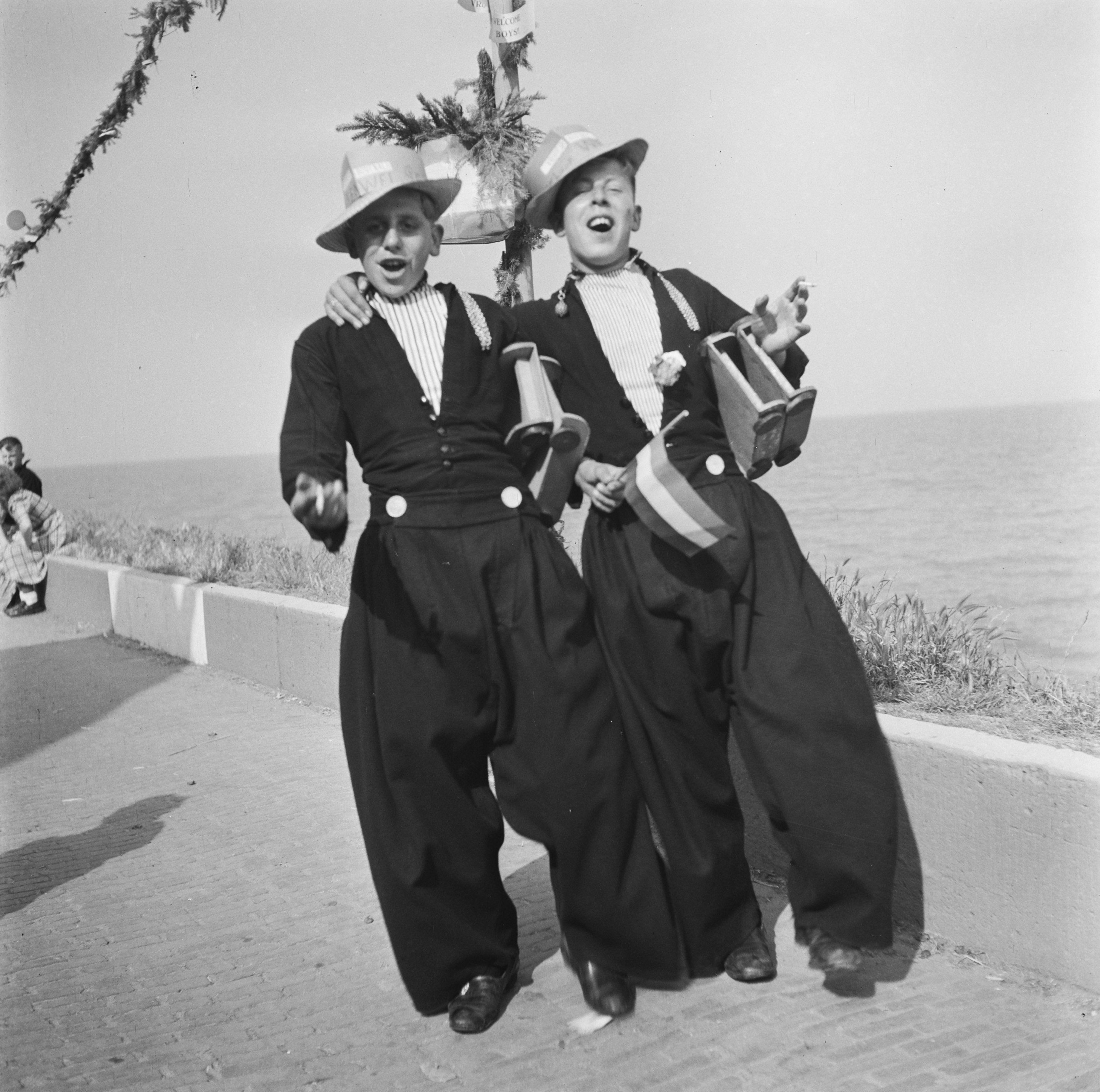
Volendam after the war, July 1945.

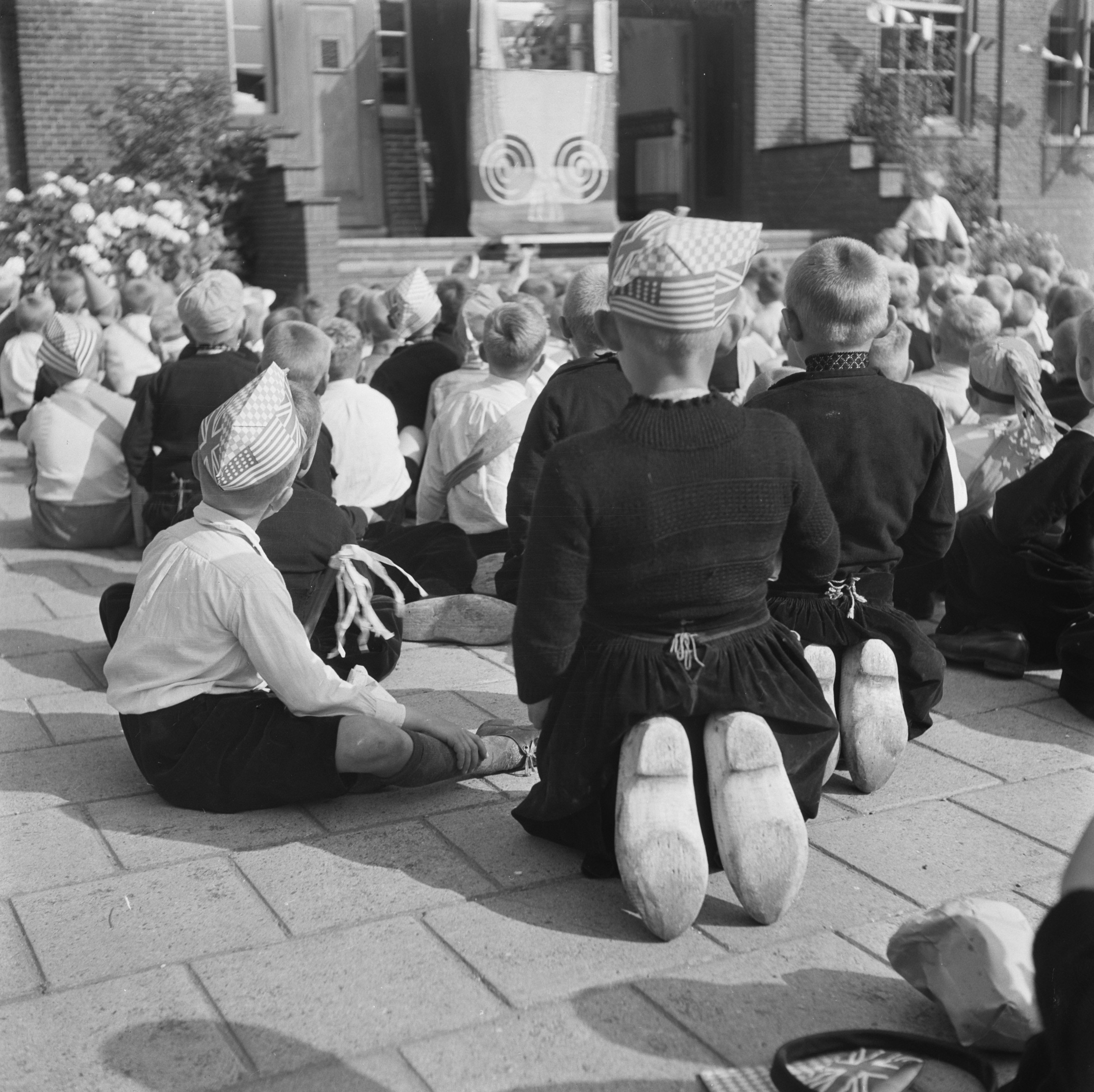
Volendam after the war, July 1945.

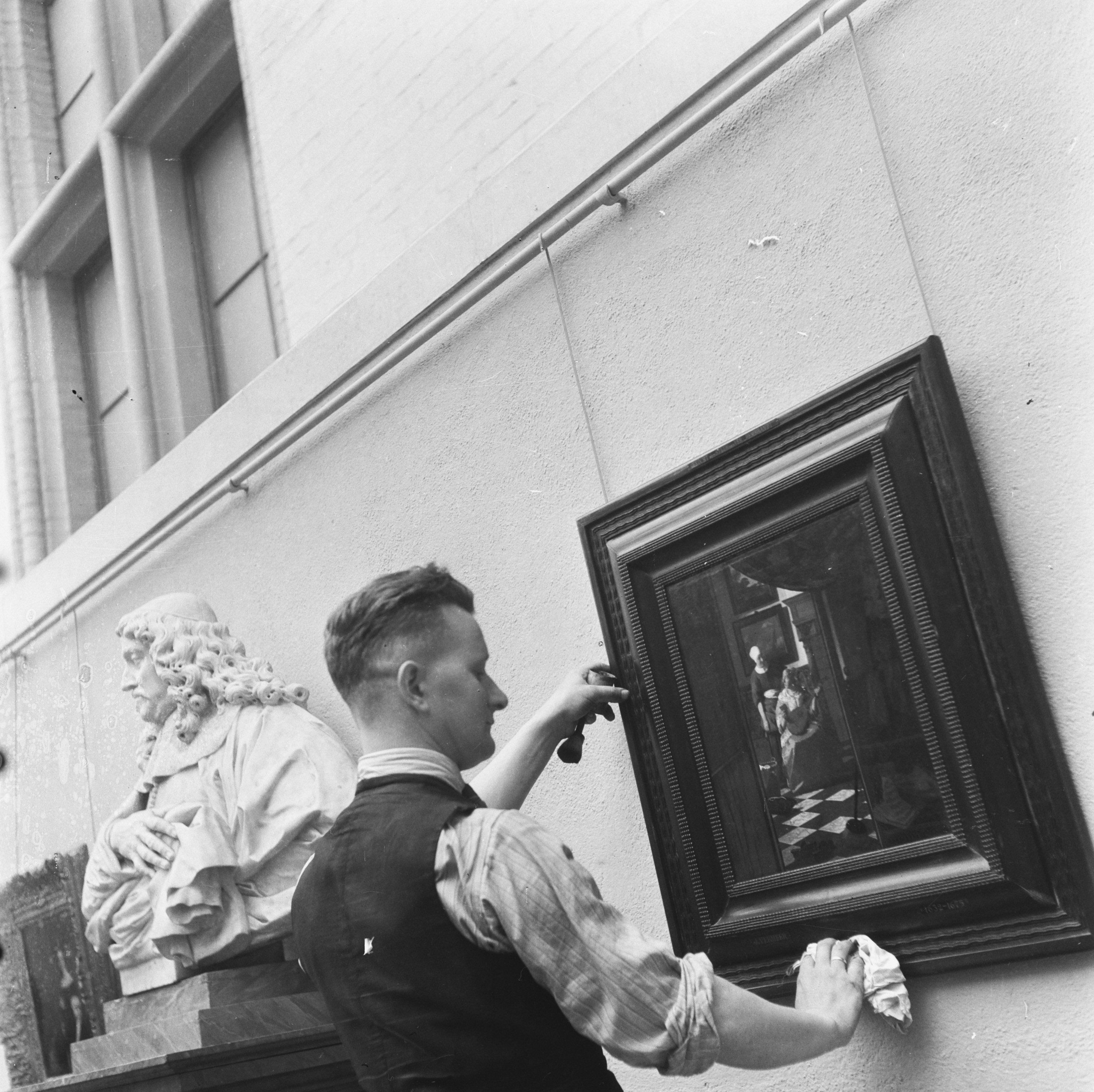
The Love Letter (Vermeer)
Rijksmuseum Amsterdam, July 1945.

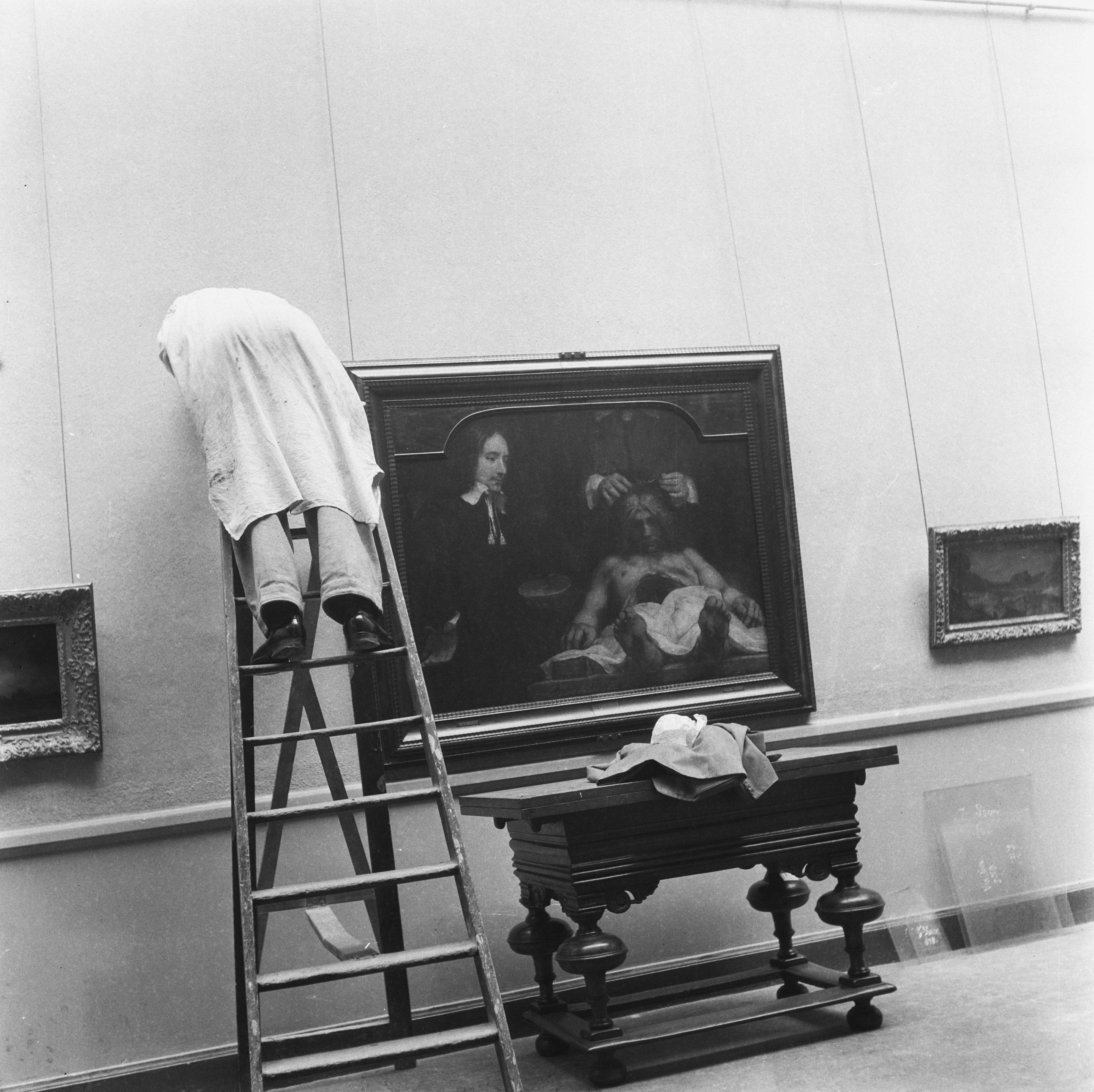
The Anatomy Lesson of Dr. Deijman, returned to the Rijksmuseum,
July 1945.

== Postwar ==
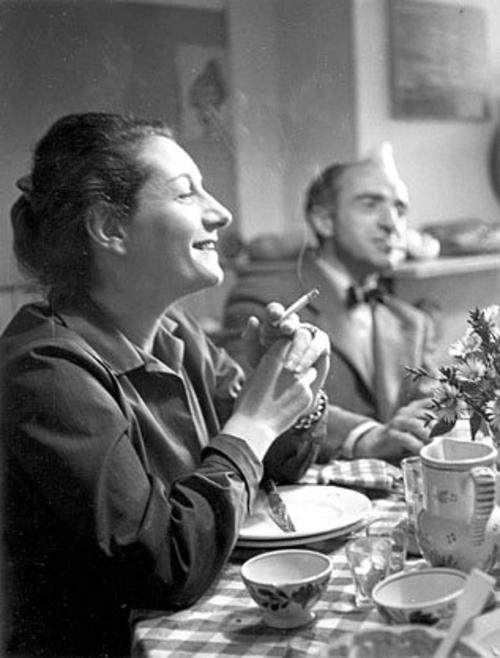
Self-portrait with husband, Amsterdam, 1951.

After the war, she became a fashion photographer and was an associate and mentor of Ed van der Elsken. She participated in the group show Photo '48 and in 1952, together with Carel Blazer, Eva Besnyö and Cas Oorthuys, the exhibition Photographie, both in Amsterdam's Stedelijk Museum. Edward Steichen chose her 1947 portrait of a staid and elderly Dutch couple for the section 'we two form a multitude' in the Museum of Modern Art world-touring The Family of Man that was seen by an audience of 9 million. In October 2006-January 2007 her work was included in a display of Twentieth Century European photography at the Barbican Art Gallery, London.

Because of her long battle with cancer, Andriesse could not complete the photography for the book The World of Van Gogh (Dutch edition: De Wereld van Van Gogh) and died at the age of 39. The book was published posthumously.

The Emmy Andriessestraat (Emmy Andriesse Street) in the Oostelijk Havengebied (Eastern Docklands), Amsterdam, is named after her.

=== Gallery ===
Many Andriesse photos of the South of France were commissioned for the book by W. Jos de Gruyter, The World of Van Gogh, Amsterdam 1953, but not all were published.

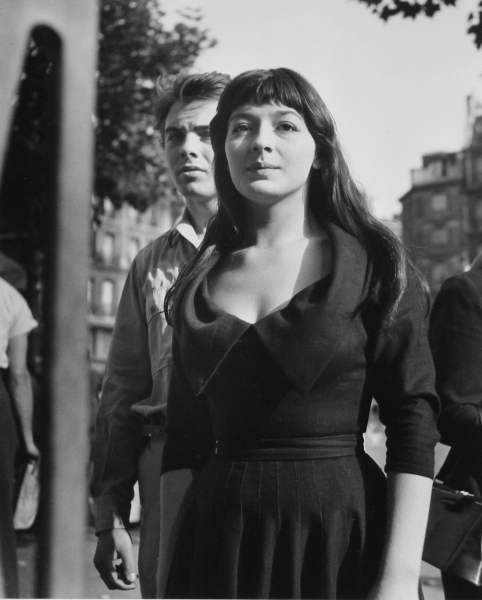
Emmy Andriesse: French singer and actress Juliette Gréco, 1948.

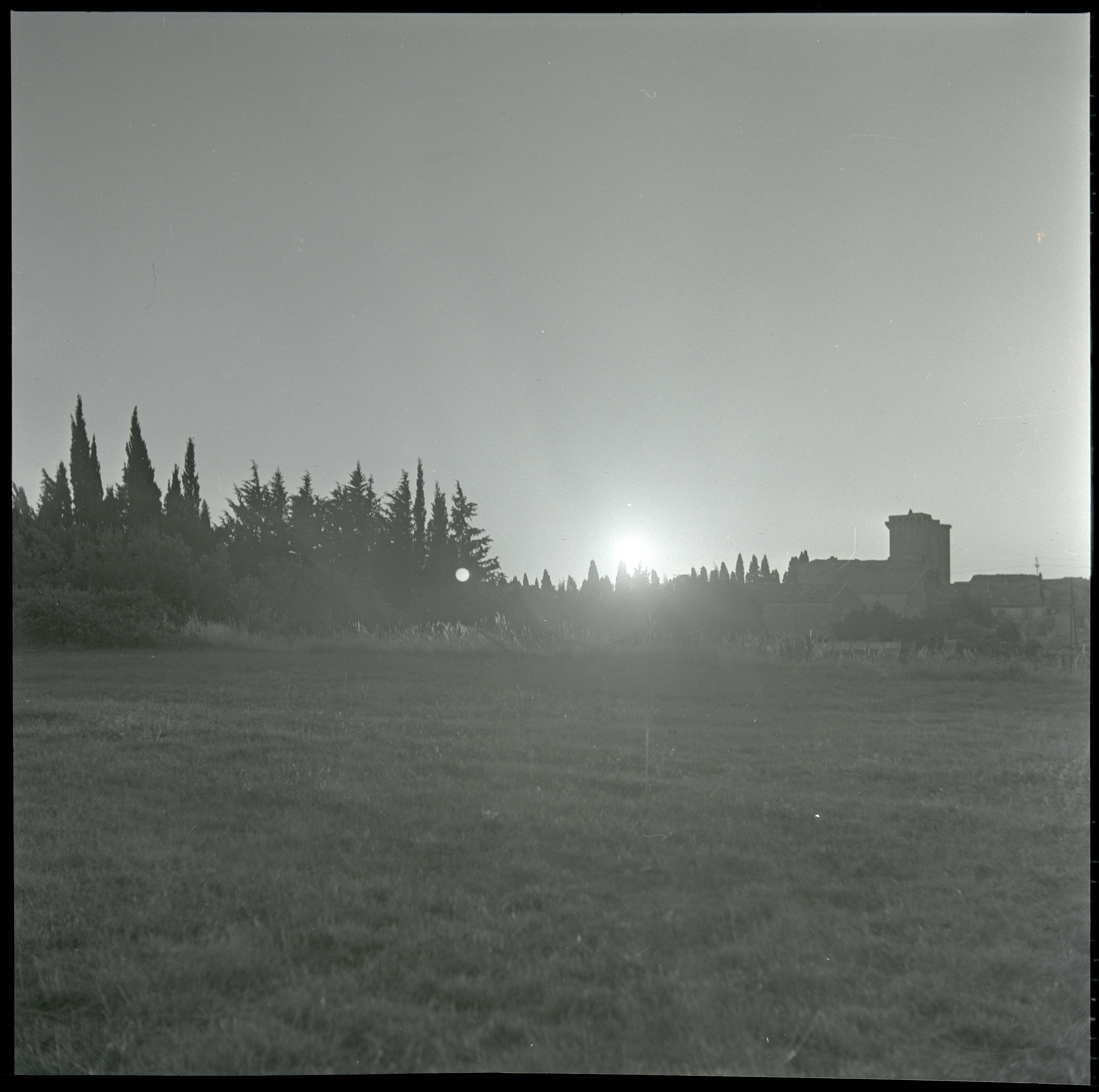
Landscape with trees and a building in the background, South of France, 1951-1952.

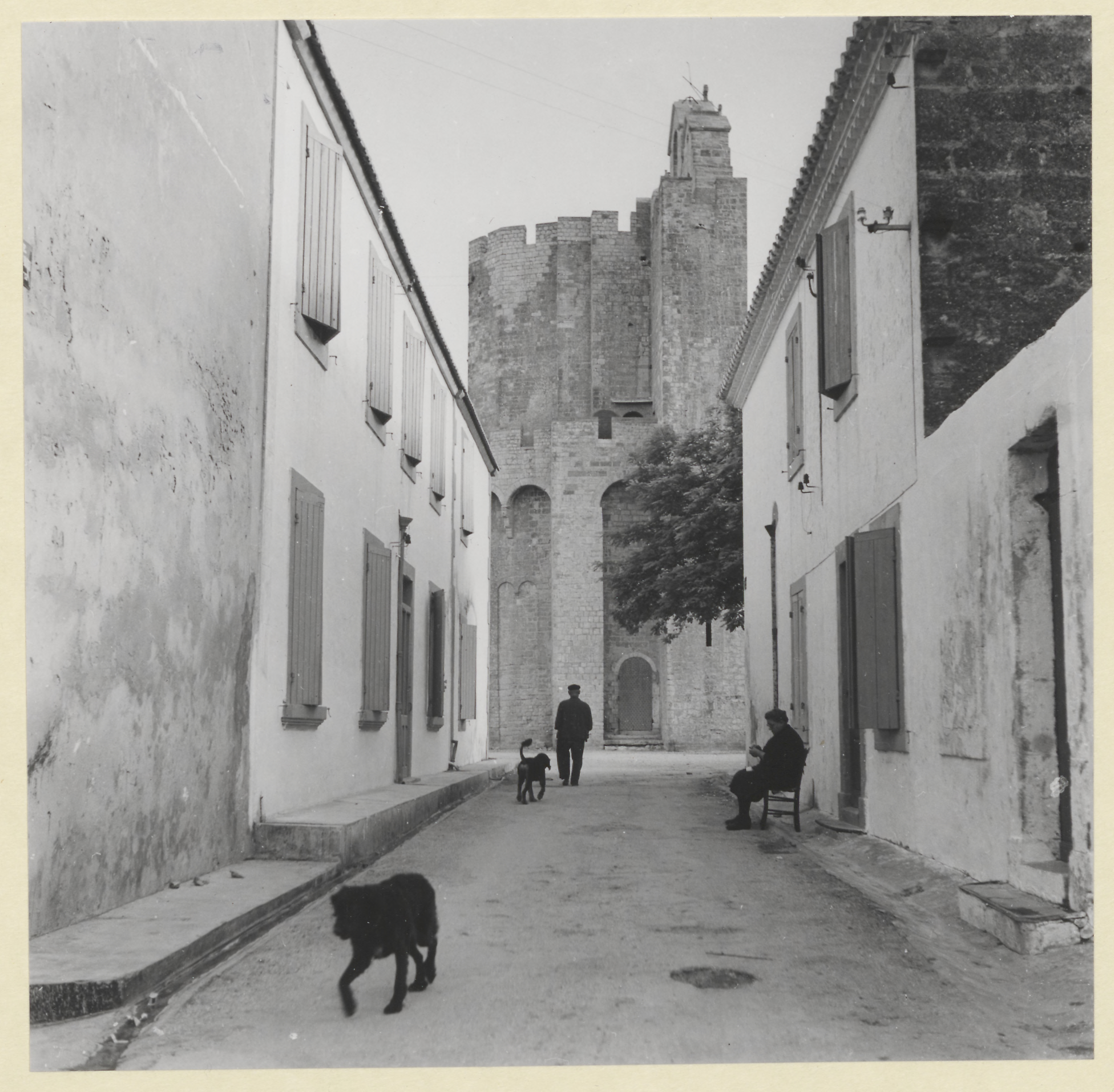
Street near the church, Saintes-Maries-de-la-Mer, 1951-1952.

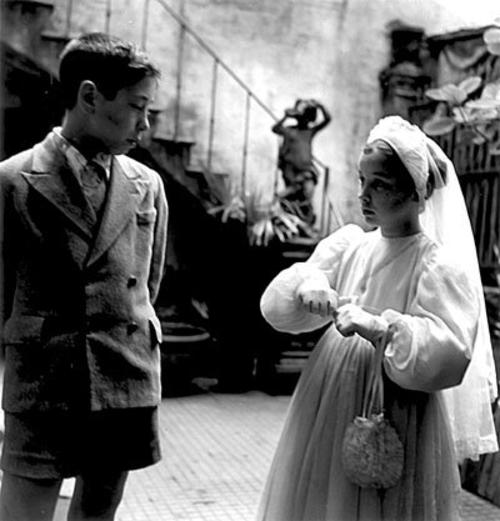
Untitled.

==== Auvers-sur-Oise, France ====
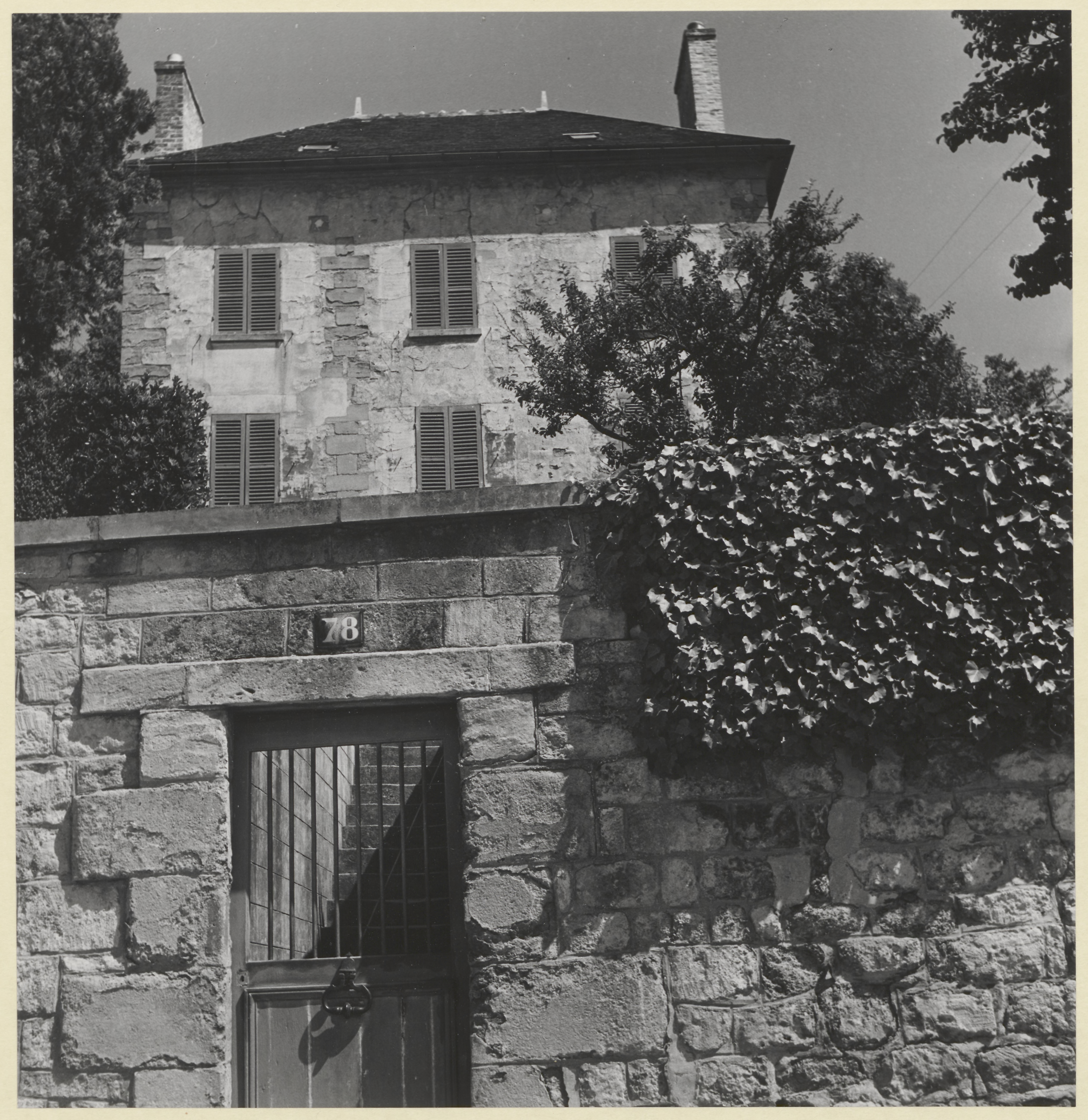
House of doctor Gachet, Auvers-sur-Oise, France, 1951-1952.

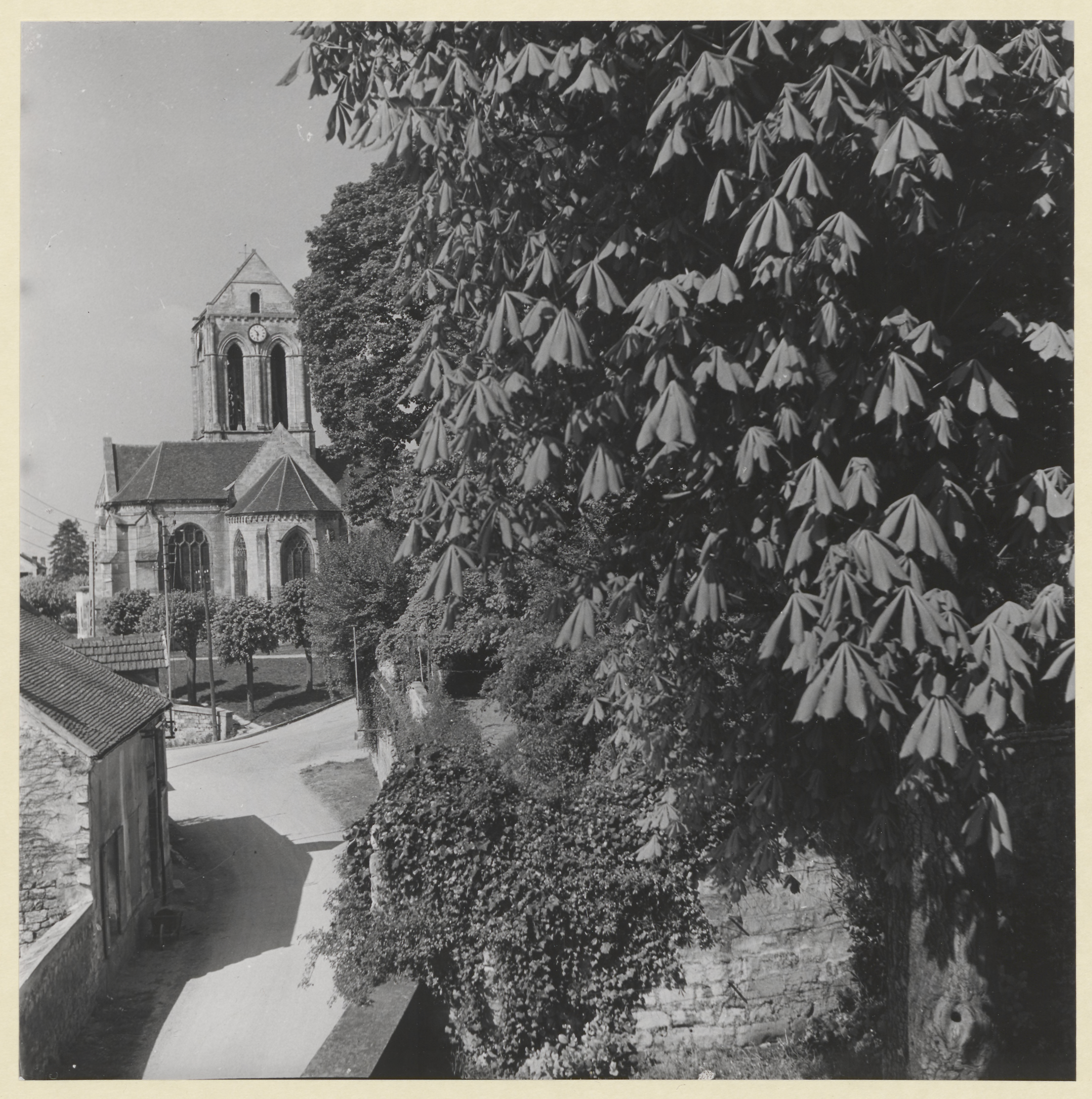
Église Notre-Dame-de-l’Assomption seen from Rue du Montcel, Auvers-sur-Oise, 1951-1952.

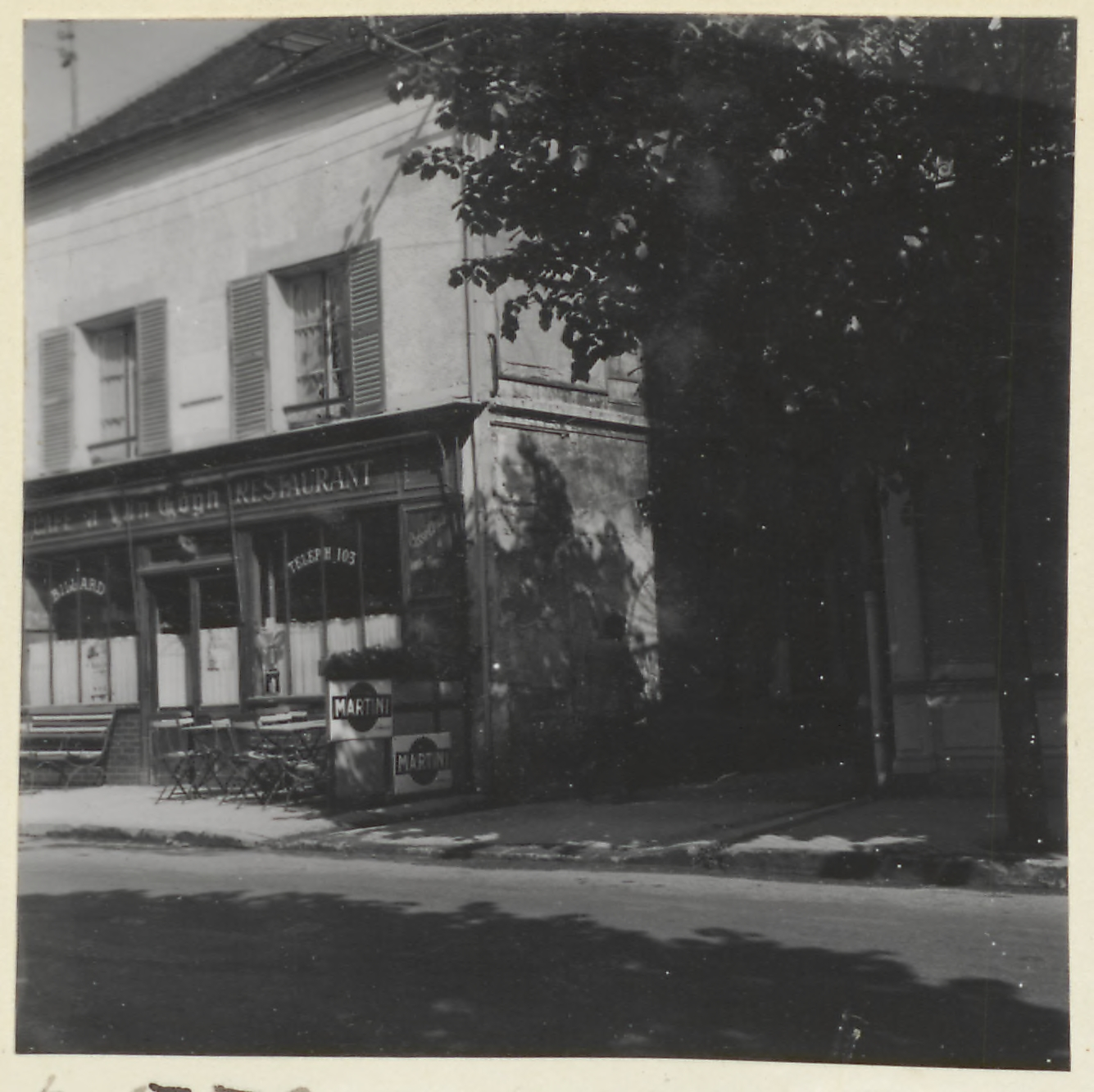
Auberge Ravoux, where Van Gogh died, Auvers-sur-Oise, 1951-1952.

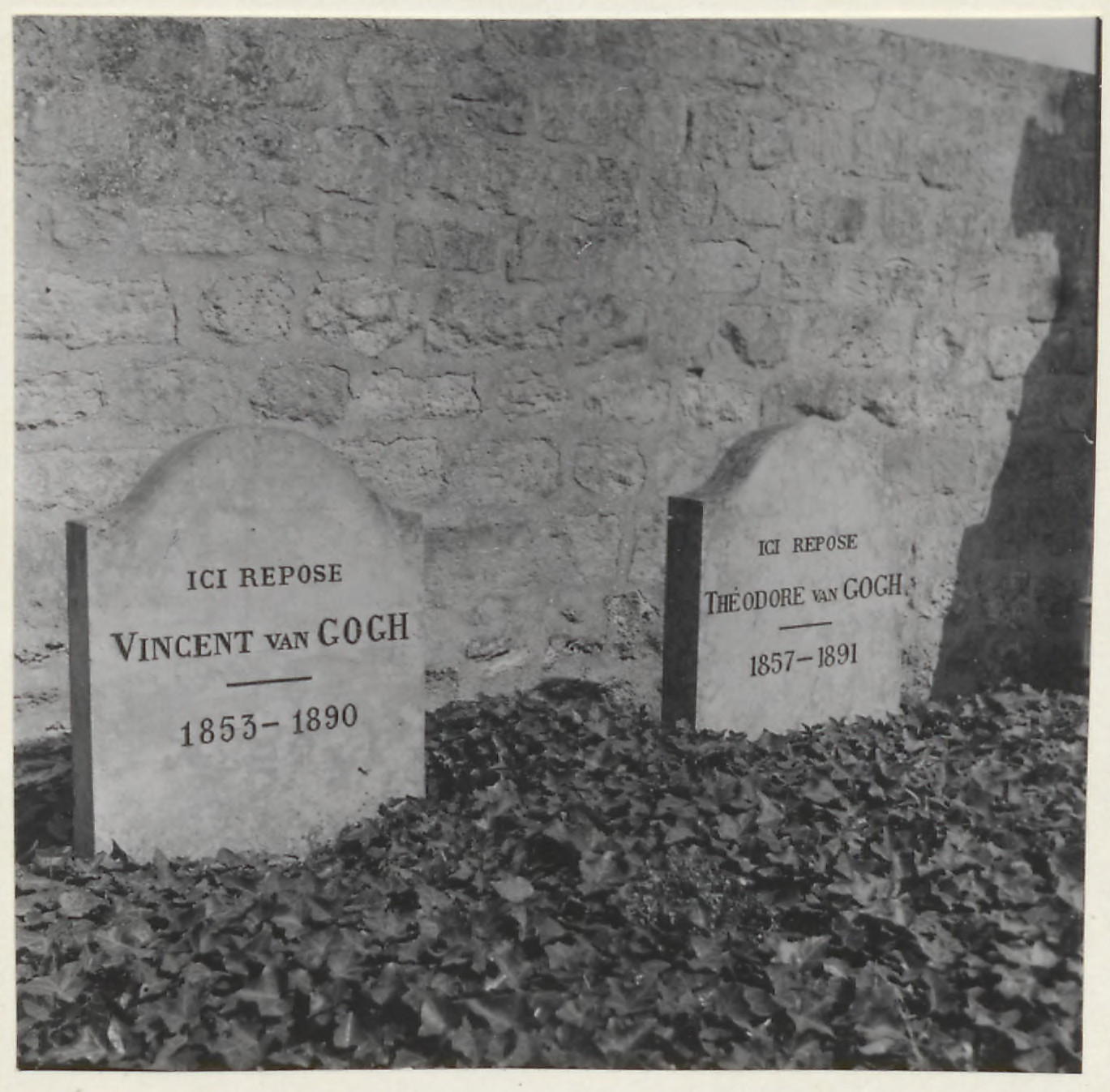
Gravestones of Vincent and Theo van Gogh, Cimetière d'Auvers-sur-Oise, 1951-1952.

== Works in collections ==
A large collection of prints and negatives are kept in the special collections of Leiden University Libraries. Also the Stedelijk Museum Amsterdam has works by Andriesse in the collection.

== Documentaries ==
- Emmy Andriesse, NOS Dutch broadcast television documentary, 30 April 1991.
- Paul Moody, The Underground Camera (De ondergedoken camera), 1995. Duration 60 min. for Arte, ARD and NCRV.
