= Marwan Bassiouni =

Photographer based in the Netherlands

Marwan Bassiouni (born 1985) is a photographer born in Switzerland and living in the Netherlands. His main topic is interaction between Islam and Western culture.

== Early life and education ==
Bassiouni was born in Morges, Vaud, Switzerland. He studied photography at Royal Academy of Art in The Hague.

== Work ==
In 2019, Bassiouni published the book New Dutch Views which shows Dutch landscapes and cityscapes seen from the interiors of mosques in the Netherlands through the windows. In the same year, he had a solo exhibition at The Hague Museum of Photography. In 2021, a photograph by Bassiouni (New Dutch Views #12) was included in the Netherlands Photo Museum's permanent exhibition Gallery of Honour of Dutch Photography, consisting of 99 photographs.

== Publications ==
- New Dutch Views. Eindhoven: Lecturis, 2019. ISBN 978-9462263307.

== Collections ==
Bassiouni's work is held in the following permanent collections:

- Museum of Fine Arts Bern
- Netherlands Photo Museum
- Kunstmuseum Den Haag
