= Rein Jelle Terpstra =

Dutch artist

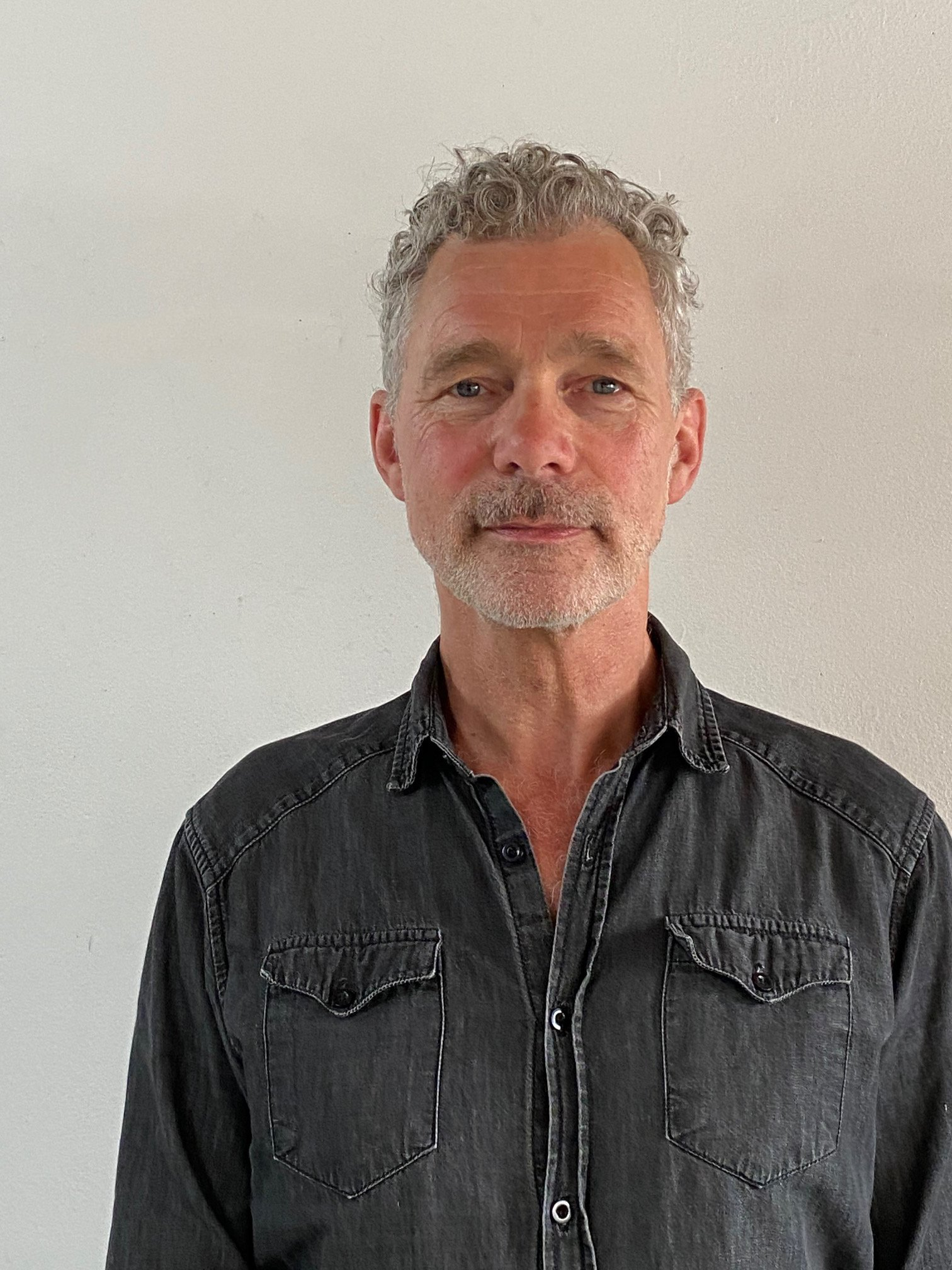
- Born: 4 July 1960 (age 66); Leeuwarden, Netherlands
- Occupation: Visual artist
- Years active: 1982–present

Rein Jelle Terpstra (born 4 July 1960) is a Dutch visual artist and a lecturer at the Minerva Art Academy, Hanze University of Applied Sciences in Groningen.

== Education ==
Terpstra was educated at the AKI Academy of Art & Design in Enschede and the Rijksakademie van beeldende kunsten in Amsterdam. After his time at the Rijksakademie, Terpstra focused on photography in relation to perception, memory, and history.

== Funeral Train ==
Since 2014, Terpstra has been working on the project The Robert F. Kennedy Funeral Train – The People’s View.

In this project, he reconstructs the journey of the funeral train of the assassinated presidential candidate Robert F. Kennedy on 8 June 1968, through photos taken by bystanders. This project resulted in an installation, film, and book, and has been exhibited at the SFMoMA in San Francisco, which acquired the work. This long-running project has been exhibited at various locations including the Nederlands Fotomuseum in Rotterdam, Les Rencontres d'Arles, Hamburger Kunsthalle, Fabra y Coats in Barcelona, and the Finnish Museum of Photography in Helsinki. In 2019, Stiftung Buchkunst awarded the book The Robert F. Kennedy Funeral Train—The People’s View a gold medal and deemed it "The Most Beautiful Book in the World".

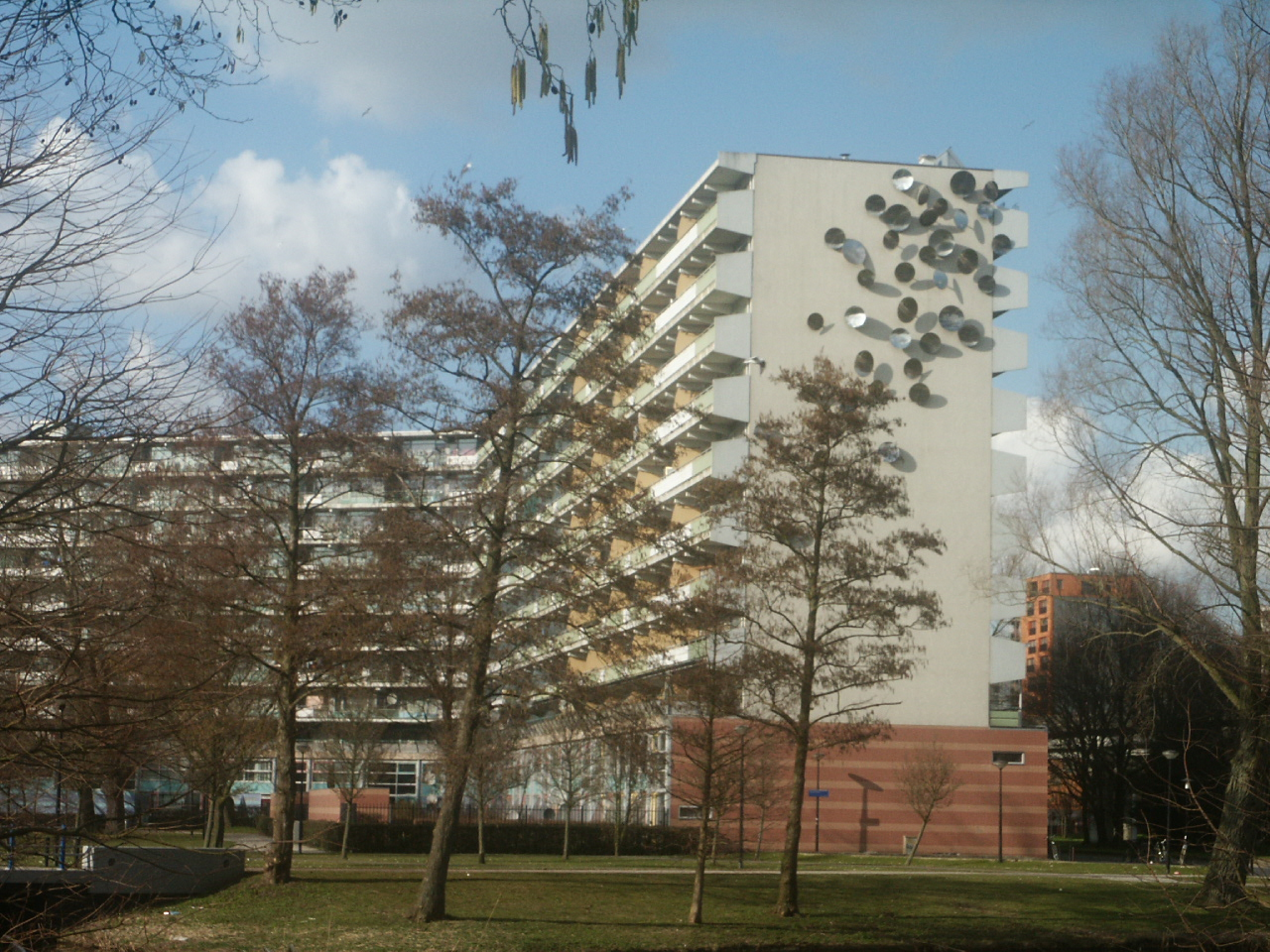
Round mirrors on apartment building in Bijlmermeer

Terpstra has also created several works in public spaces, such as the artwork for the residential complex Groeneveen and the wave project in IJburg.

== Other publications ==
- Nabeelden, Album van de niet gemaakte foto (Publisher De Balie, 2002). For this collection, he invited 29 artists and writers to write a story about a photo they were unable to take. This project has been exhibited at the Nederlands Fotomuseum in Rotterdam, which acquired the project in the form of an audio table (2010).
- Retracing (Publisher post editions 2013): a visual account of a collaboration with people losing their eyesight.
- Donkere Duinen (self-published, in collaboration with Willem van Zoetendaal, 2021). Donkere Duinen is based on a collection of negatives shot during the wartime occupation of '40-'45 and has been exhibited at the Fotomuseum Den Haag (2022–2023).
