= Jo Voskuil =

Dutch artist (1897–1972)

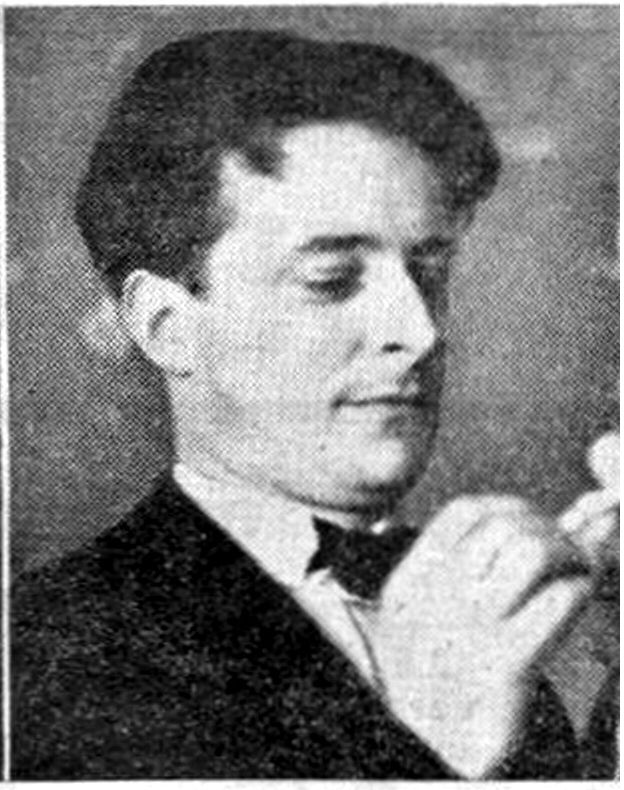
Jo Voskuil, 1931

Johan Jacob Voskuil (26 March 1897, Breda – 22 June 1972, Amsterdam) was a Dutch painter, comics artist, illustrator, bookbinder and a member of the Dutch resistance during World War II.

== Biography ==
To dedicate himself to the arts, Voskuil left Breda and his job as a teacher in the early 20s for Bergen aan Zee. He was a communist and made a lot of political posters and book covers, like the cover of de Nieuwe Geïllustreerde Wereldgeschiedenis (1929–1932) edited by Jan Romein.

In 1936, partnered with photographer Cas Oorthuys, he organized an exposition to expose the realities of Nazi Germany during the Olympics of the same year, resulting are famous posters Arbeiders leest De Tribune and De Olympiade onder dictatuur. Voskuil's work was included in the 1939 exhibition and sale Onze Kunst van Heden (Our Art of Today) at the Rijksmuseum in Amsterdam. In 1941 he created a comic strip, Klit, de Schoonzoon.

Voskuil married German opera singer and actress Dora Paulsen on May 5, 1938. The didn't have any children. After her death in 1970, Voskuil remarried with opera singer Ruth Horna in 1972. Voskuil died shortly after getting married.

== Sources ==
- Voskuil, Johan Jacob at the RKD databases
