= Otto Umbehr =

German painter

Umbo, born Otto Maximilian Umbehr (January 18, 1902 – May 13, 1980), was a German photojournalist and artist who had studied in the Bauhaus and worked as a photojournalist for the Wehrmacht in World War II. After the end of it, he had to endure many years of financial hardships, which only changed after photography became accepted an own discipline of art and from 1975 onwards he had several exhibitions.

== Education and early life ==
Otto Umbehr was born in Düsseldorf and is known for his photo journalism as well as artworks. Umbehr was the second of six children of industrial architect Karl Friedrich Umbehr. His mother Frieda died when he was a young boy. He was trained in Duisburg, Aachen and Düsseldorf. In 1921, he studied at the Bauhaus in Weimar where he attended classes by Johannes Itten. At the Bauhaus he became acquainted with Oskar Schlemmer, Paul Citroen, Wassily Kandinsky and Eva Besnyö and was influenced by László Moholy-Nagy. With Citroen's help, Umbehr took on the artist name of Umbo and started a photo studio in 1926. He made photo collages as a camera assistant for the 1927 film by Walter Ruttmann called Berlin: Symphony of a Metropolis.

== Professional career ==
In 1928 he became one of the founding members of the agency Dephot (Deutscher Photo Service GmbH) where he was friends with Felix H. Man and Robert Capa. The agency was closed by the Nazis in 1933. During the Nazi period, Umbo worked as a photojournalist for the magazine Signal, which reported from the frontlines. In 1943 his photo archives, containing 50,000–60,000 negatives, were destroyed in a bombing raid on Berlin. Only a few of his works from that period have survived.

After the war Umbo returned to Hanover with his wife, the graphic designer Imgard Wanders and their daughter. He lost his left eye, but that did not prevent him from continuing his art. He is known for photos of the ruins of postwar Hanover and later taught photography at the School of Applied Arts there. From 1975 onwards his photographs were more widely accepted by the art critics and he was able to take part in several exhibitions.

== Publications ==
- Bernhard Holeczek (zusammen mit Christiane Hinze und Heinrich Riebesehl): UMBO Photographien 1925–1933. Spectrum Photogalerie im Kunstmuseum Hannover mit Sammlung Sprengel, Hannover 1979. (Ausstellungskatalog Hannover 1979)
- Christiane Hinze: Aspekte des Bildjournalismus – exemplarisch aufgezeigt am Beispiel Otto Umbehr (UMBO), Examensarbeit an der Universitaet Hannover, 3. Mai 1979
- Herbert Molderings: UMBO. Vom Bauhaus zum Bildjournalismus. Kunstverein für die Rheinlande und Westfalen, Düsseldorf 1995. ISBN 3-928762-42-7 (Ausstellungskatalog Düsseldorf, Berlin, Frankfurt am Main, München, Paris 1995–1996)
- Herbert Molderings: Umbo: Otto Umbehr 1902–1980. Richter Verlag, Düsseldorf 1996. ISBN 3-928762-43-5
- Herbert Molderings: Umbo. Centre National de la Photographie, Paris 1997, (Photo Poche 66). ISBN 978-2-8675-4101-8.
- Inka Schube u. a. (Hgg.): UMBO. Fotograf, Köln: Snoeck Verlagsgesellschaft [2019], ISBN 9783864422805.
- Hans-Jürgen Tast: Umbo: Ich habe es gesehen. Ich habe es erlebt. Ich habe es festgehalten., Schellerten 2019, Kulleraugen, ISBN 9783888420535
