= Charlotte Dumas =

Dutch photographer

Charlotte Dumas (born 1977) is a Dutch photographer.

For the 2013 series Anima, Dumas photographed the horses used to pull the funeral caissons at Arlington National Cemetery.

Her work is included in the collections of the Museum of Fine Arts Houston, and the Netherlands Photo Museum.
