= Eva Besnyö =

Dutch-Hungarian photographer

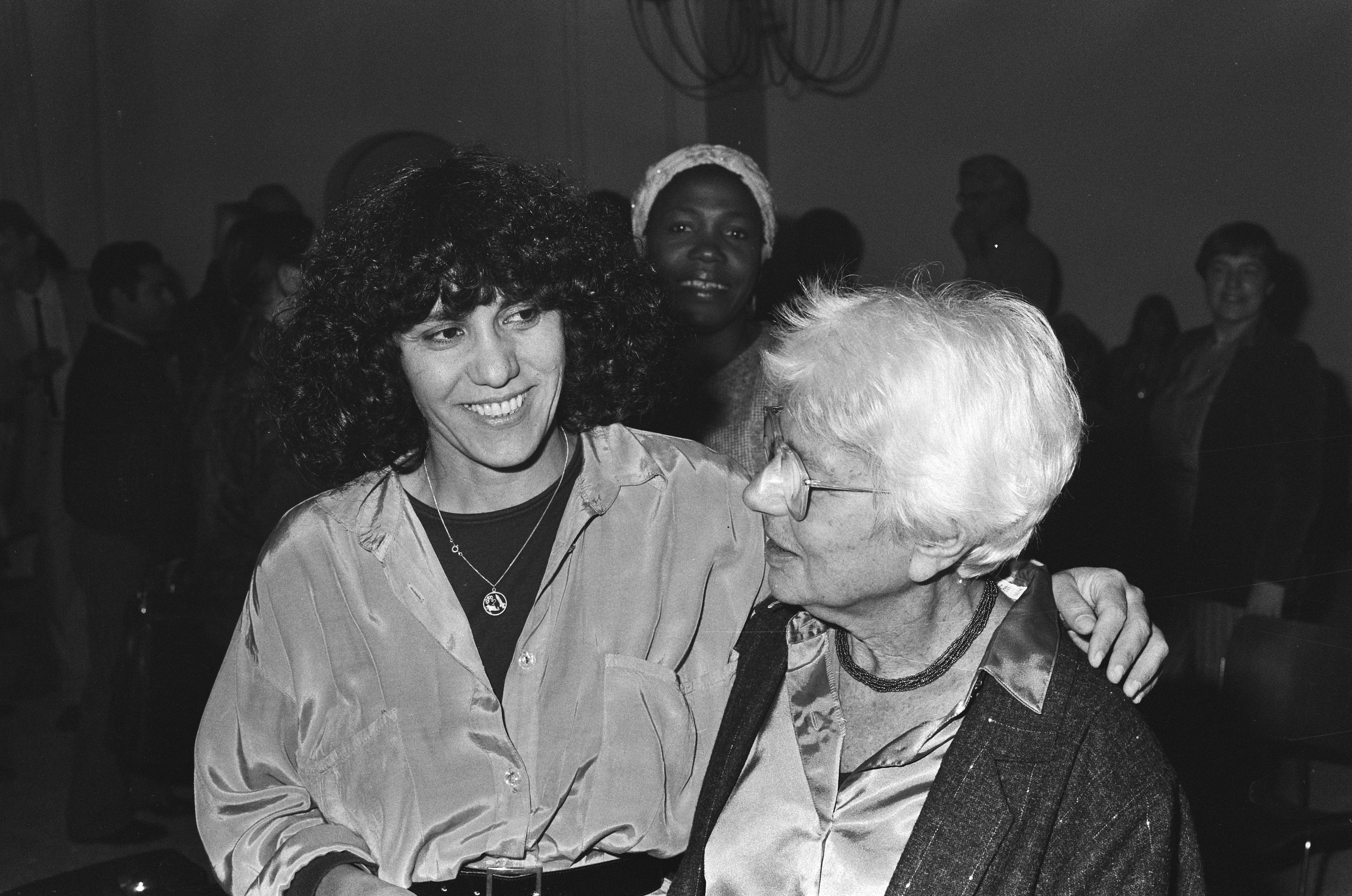
Maviye Karaman Ince & Eva Besnyö (1985)

Éva Besnyő (29 April 1910 – 12 December 2003) was a Dutch-Hungarian photographer who participated in the Nieuwe Fotografie (New Photography) movement.

== Biography ==
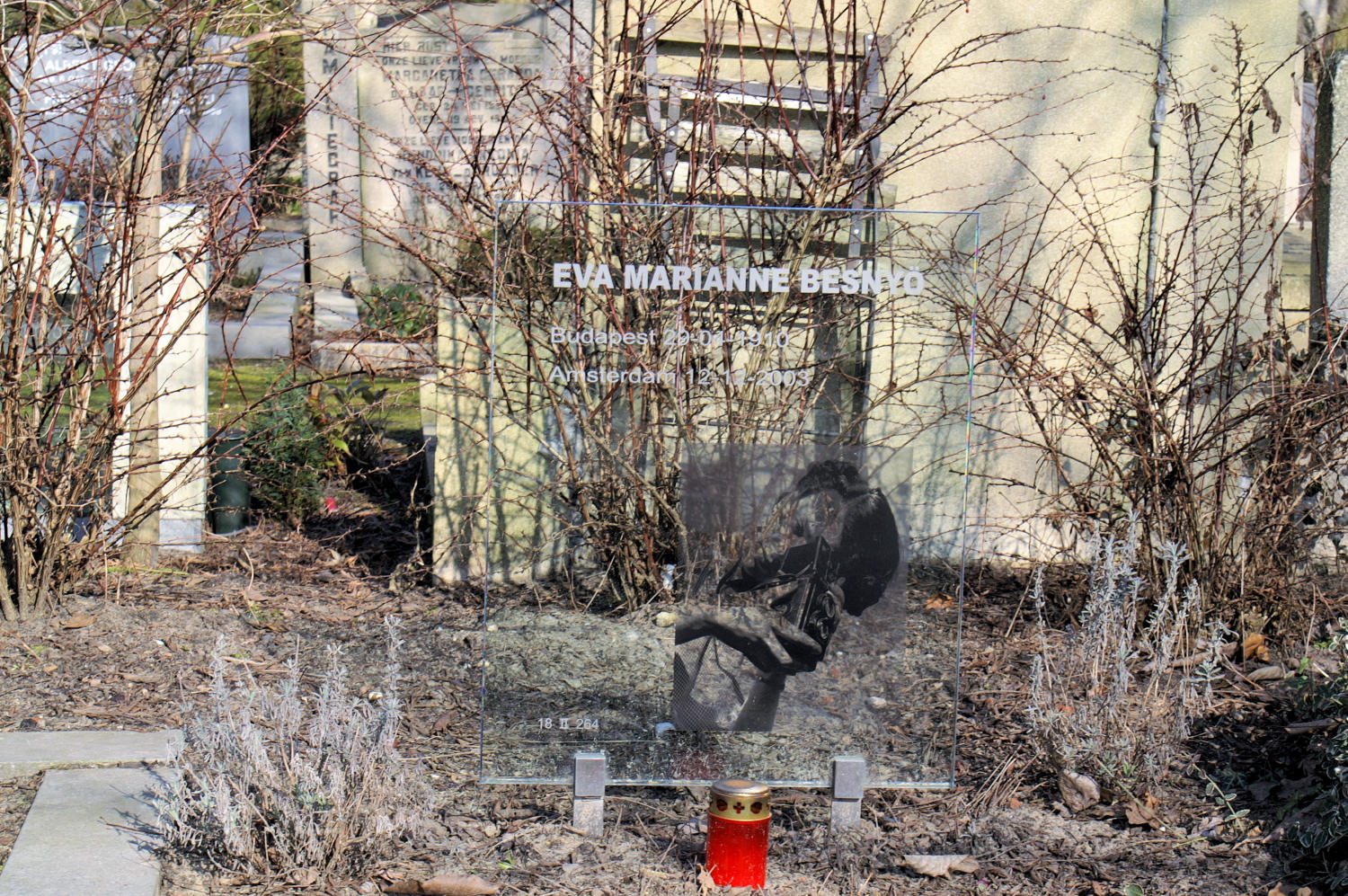
Besnyö's grave in Zorgvlied

Born in Budapest, Besnyö was brought up in a well-to-do Jewish home. In 1928, she started to study photography at József Pécsi's studio where she also served an apprenticeship.

In 1930, at the age of 20, she moved to Berlin where she first worked for advertising photographer René Ahrlé before working on photoreportages with the press photographer Peter Weller. She became part of the social and political circle of intellectuals which included György Kepes, Joris Ivens, László Moholy-Nagy, Otto Umbehr and Robert Capa. In 1931, she opened her own studio where she was successful in receiving agency work. Her well-known photograph of the Romani boy with a cello on his back stems from that period. Threatened by the onset of National Socialism in 1932, she moved to Amsterdam with her Dutch friend John Fernhout whom she married. With the assistance of her mother in law Charley Toorop, she participated in exhibitions which led to commissions in press photography, portraits, fashion and architecture. Besnyö was a member of Nederlandsche Vereeniging voor Ambachts- en Nijverheidskunst (V.A.N.K.) the Dutch Association for Craft and Craft Art. Her solo exhibition in the Van Lier art gallery in 1933 consolidated her recognition in the Netherlands. Besnyö experienced a further breakthrough with her architectural photography only a few years later: translating the idea of functionalist "New Building" into a "New Seeing".

Unable to work during the German occupation of the Netherlands, she went into hiding. After the war she again received commissions for documentary work but became less active as she raised her two children fathered by the graphic designer Wim Brusse. In the 1970s, she was active in the Dutch feminist movement Dolle Mina, fighting for equal rights and photographing street protests.

== Photographs for Dutch stamps (1947) ==
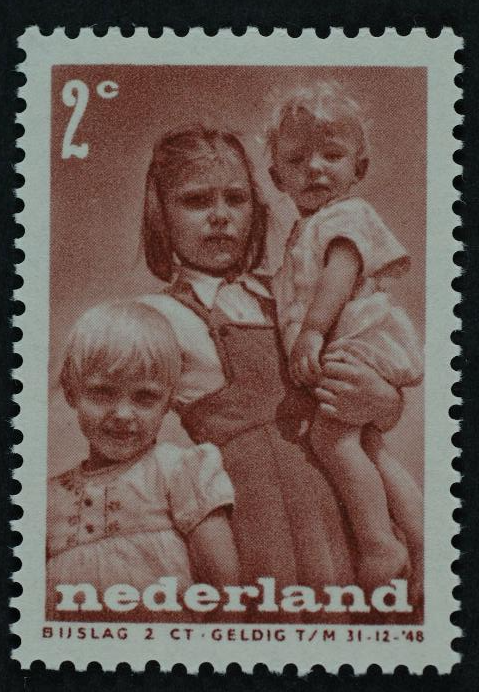

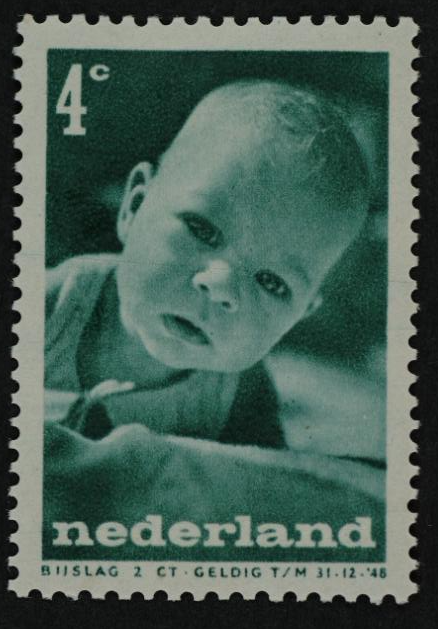

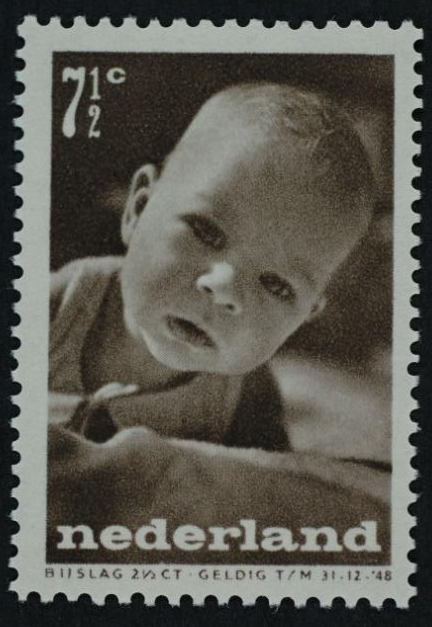

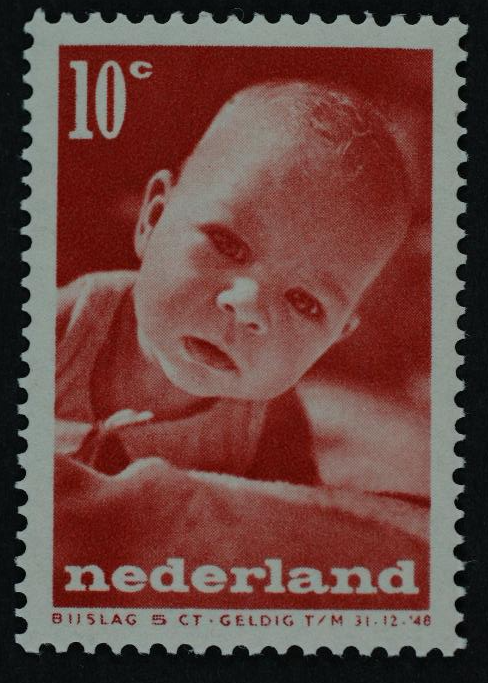

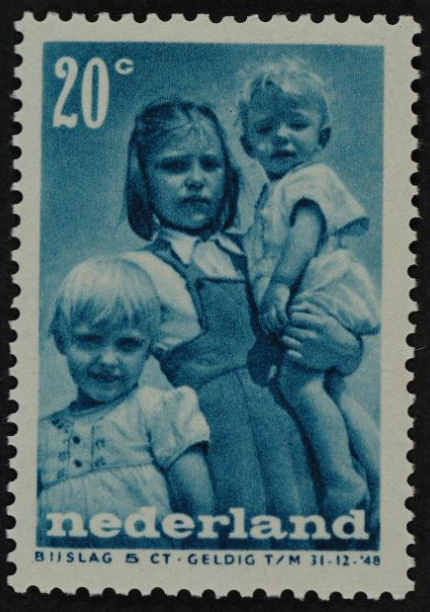

== Exhibitions ==
- 1955: work selected for The Family of Man international touring exhibition by Edward Steichen and MoMA;
- 1982: N’halve eeuw werk, Amsterdams Historisch Museum. Amsterdam;
- 1991: Onbekende foto’s, Jewish Historical Museum. Amsterdam
- 1992: Photographien 1930–1989, Das Verborgene Museum. Berlin
- 1992: Vintage Prints, Amsterdams Historisch Museum. Amsterdam;
- 2012: Retrospective, Jeu de Paume, Paris.
- 2026: Eva Besnyö - The Liberated Camera, Fotomuseum Den Haag, The Hague.
