= Netherlands Photo Museum =

Photography museum in Rotterdam

Coordinates: 51°54′23″N 4°29′21″E

- Nederlands Fotomuseum

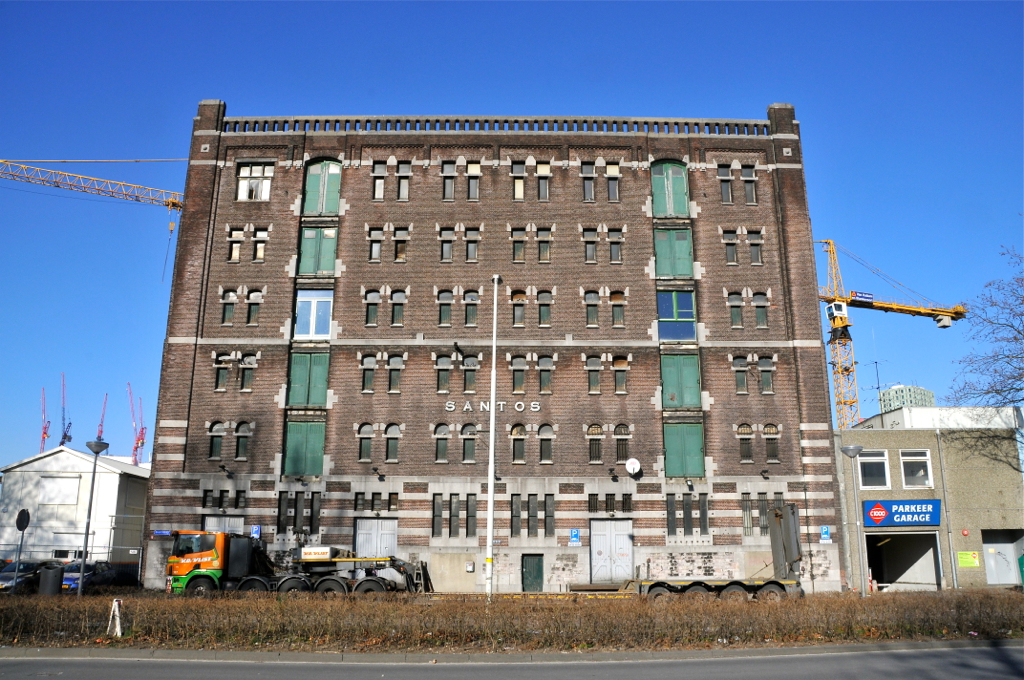
- The Santos warehouse: the new location for the museum, scheduled for opening in 2026
- Established: 2003
- Location: Kop van Zuid, Feijenoord, Rotterdam, Netherlands
- Type: Photography museum
- Visitors: 49,389 (2024)
- Website: nederlandsfotomuseum.nl/en/

The Netherlands Photo Museum (Dutch: Nederlands Fotomuseum) (NFM) is a photography museum in Rotterdam, the Netherlands, that was founded in 2003.

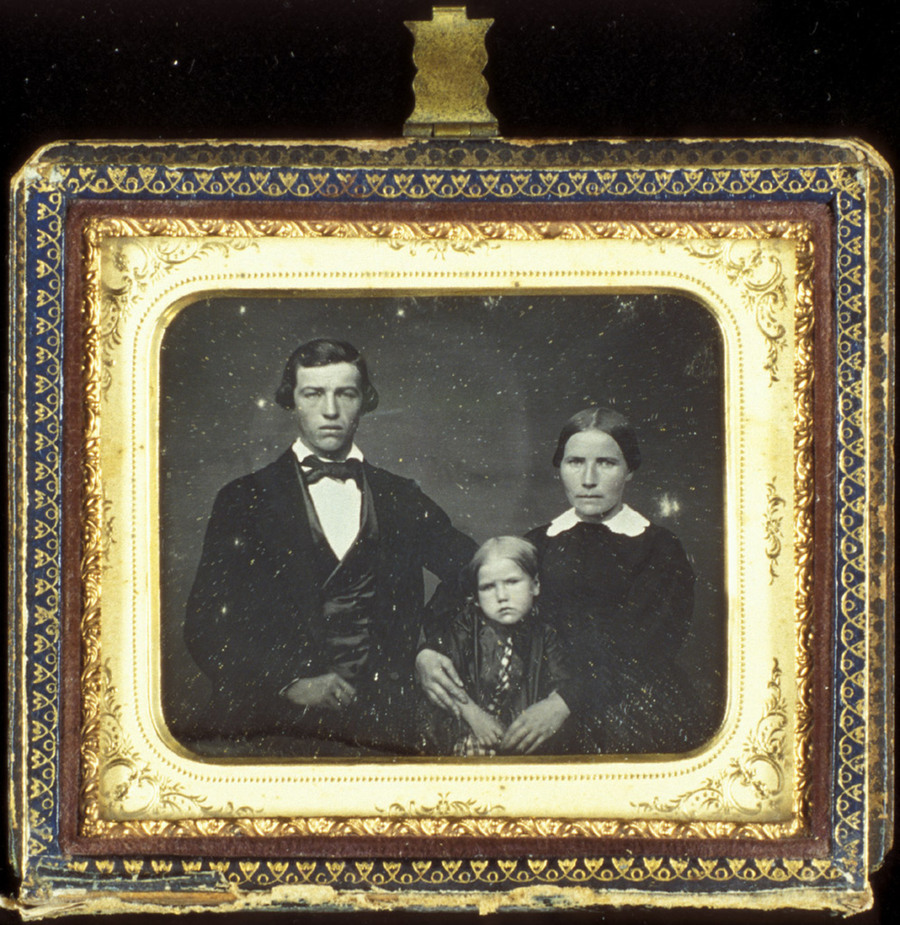
Early daguerreotype family portrait from the Netherlands Fotomuseum collection. The photographer and sitters are unknown.

The museum collection consists of many historical, social and cultural images from the 20th and 21st centuries, from the Netherlands and elsewhere. It manages more than 150 archives taken by Dutch photographers. The archives are stored in climate controlled film storage facilities.

The previous location of the museum was the Wilhelminakade in a workshop building once owned by the Holland America Line, also known as the Las Palmas building. In 2021 the Fotomuseum began looking for a new location, motivated by the rising costs in maintaining the Las Palmas building. Two years later, and following a donation of 38 million Euros from the Droom en Daad foundation, the Fotomuseum was able to buy the nearby Santos warehouse. Significant work to refurbish the building was quickly undertaken. Nevertheless, the original re-opening date of September 2025 has since been postponed to February 2026.

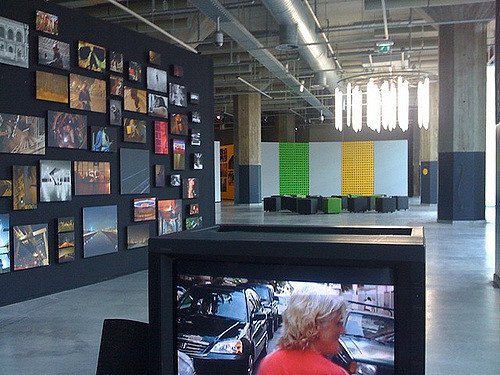
Interior shot of the Las Palmas building

== Collection ==
The museum collection consists of more than 6.5 million objects - the second-largest museum collection in the Netherlands (after Naturalis). It spans from early glass negatives (the earliest from 1842) and daguerreotypes to current day digital works. This includes both work by international photographers that live and work in the Netherlands, and Dutch photographers who have worked abroad. The specialist areas of the collection are documentary photography and analogue photos from the 20th century.

The museum is also noted for managing the complete archives of more than 160 archives of historical and contemporary Dutch photographers. Such archives are more than just collections of completed photographic works. "Many of these archives contain workbooks with try-outs of photo-combinations and visual storytelling, personally selected and created by the corresponding photographer."

Particular artists whose archives are curated by the Fotomuseum include Ed van der Elsken, Aart Klein, Chas Gerretsen, and Cas Oorthuys.

Around 300,000 of the photographs are available to see in the museum's online collection.

== History ==
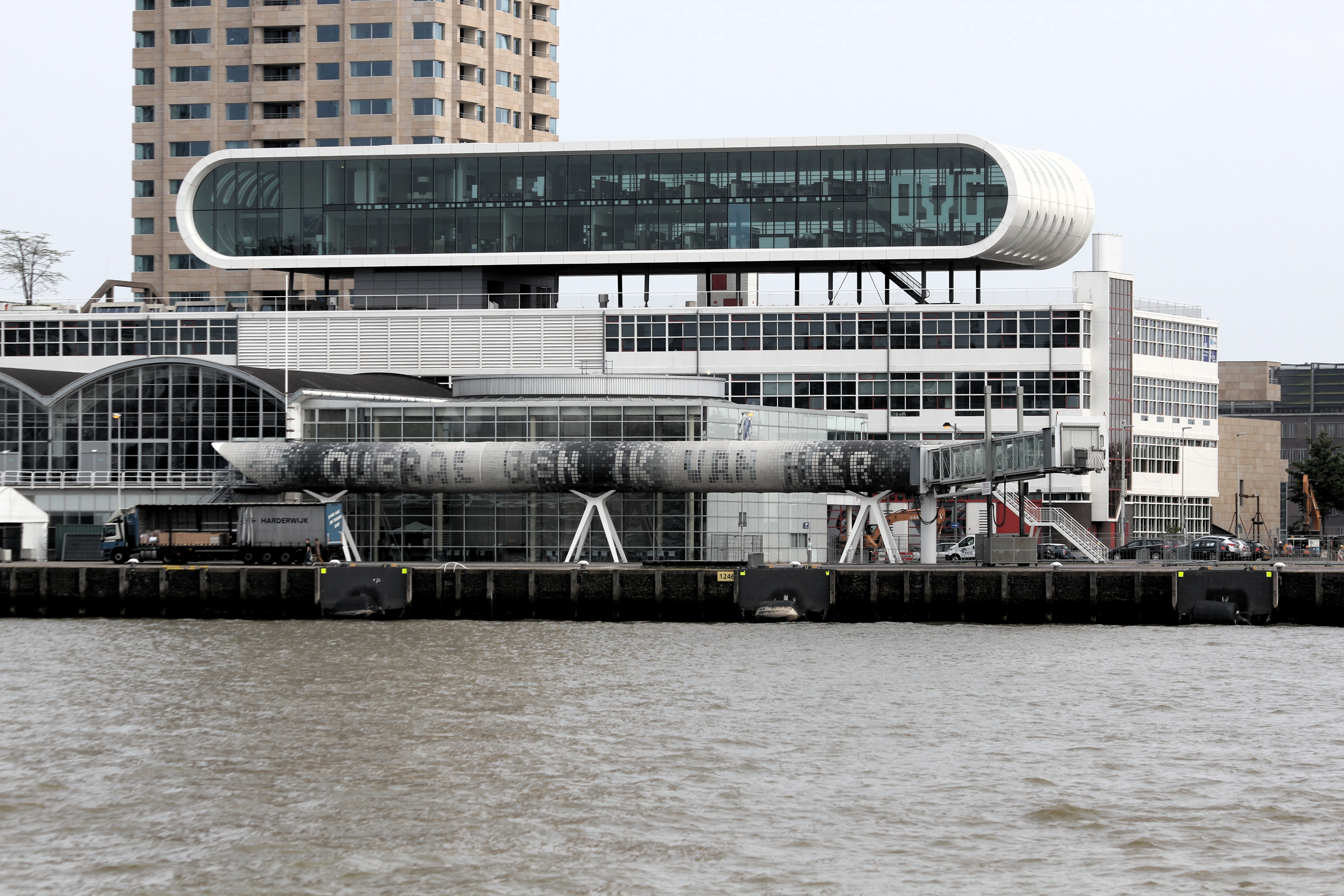
The Photo Museum's previous location at Las Palmas warehouse, Rotterdam

The Netherlands Photo Museum was an amalgamation of several related institutions. In the late 1990s, the Prins Bernhard Fund was given the task of managing the significant endowment of Hein Wertheimer, a wealthy Dutch lawyer and keen photographer. The original advice was to share the funds over several existing institutions. However, the members of the Bernhard Fund decided otherwise: the funds should be dedicated to a new centre that would fuse the Nederlands Foto Archief and the Nederlands Foto Instituut. The first recommendation was to host this in Amsterdam. However, within three years a proposal had been submitted to the government to host it in Rotterdam (with the additional participation of the Nederlands Fotorestauratie-atelier (the Dutch workshop for photography conservation)) By 2003, the new museum had opened.

== Directors ==
- 2003 - 2018: Ruud Visschedijk
- 2018 - 2025: Birgit Donker
- 2025–present: Roderick van der Lee (ad-interim)

== Visitor Numbers ==
All visitor numbers are drawn from the museum's annual reports

Year	Visitors	Notes
2024	49,389	
2023	71,978	
2022	69,108	
2021	40,179	
2020	41,260	
2019	104,047	
2018	c.90,000	
