= De Hulk =

- Hamlet
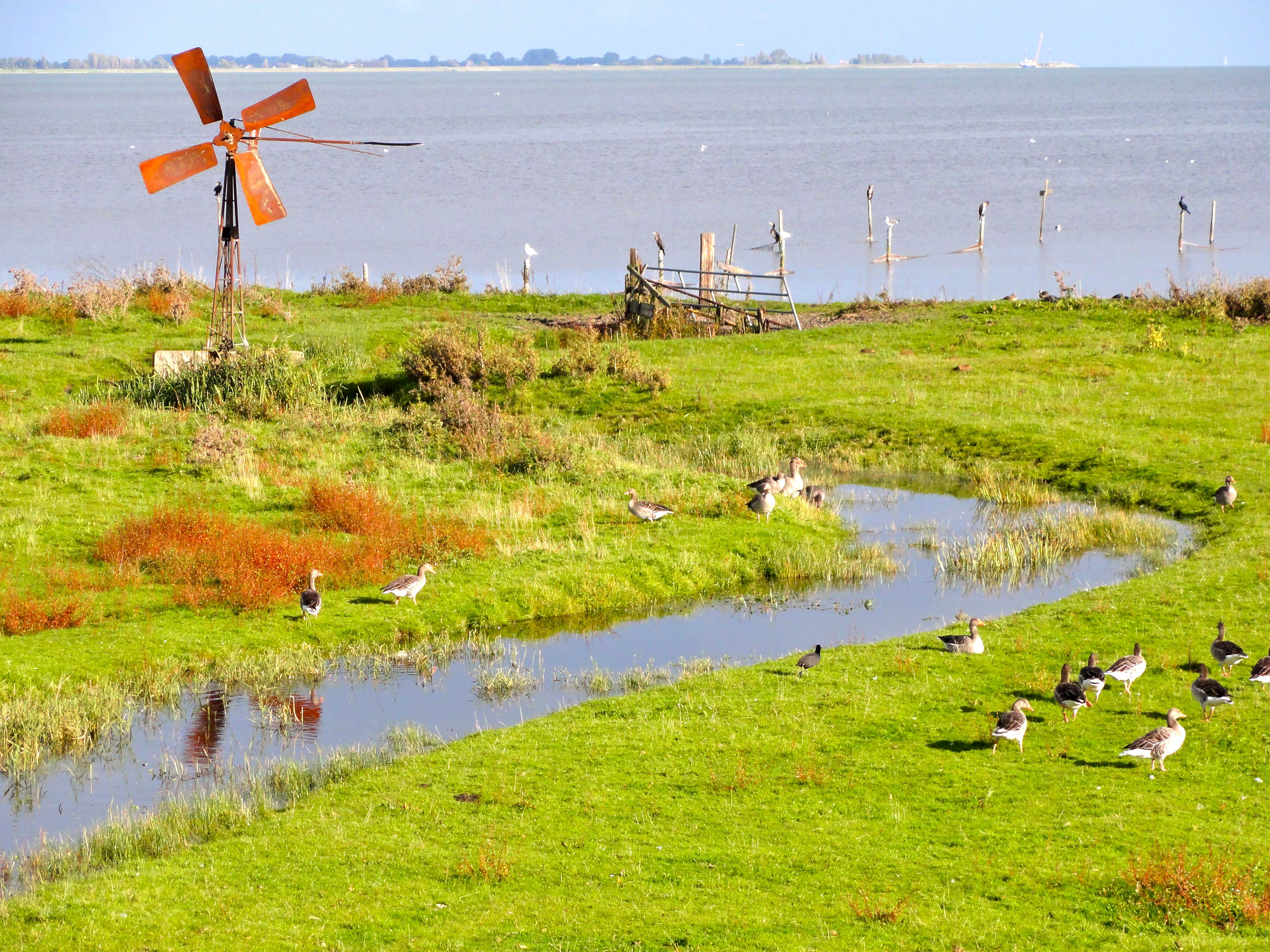

- Location in the Netherlands Location in the province of North Holland in the Netherlands
- Coordinates: 52°38′N 5°1′E
- Country: Netherlands
- Province: North Holland
- Municipality: Hoorn

De Hulk (Dutch pronunciation: [də ˈɦʏl(ə)k]) is a hamlet and nature reserve in the municipalities of Koggenland and Hoorn in the Dutch province of North Holland.

== Overview ==
De Hulk, which derives its name from a type of ship, is clamped between the villages Scharwoude and Berkhout (Koggenland) and the district Grote Waal (Hoorn).

The nature and recreation reserve is 58 acres (23.5 ha) and includes grazing cattle and sheep in the meadows beside the forest area. The area is also a canoe interchange station.

The hamlet consists of about 80 houses and 130 holiday homes.

In his youth, the well known speed skater Co Giling lived in De Hulk.
