= Harry Pot =

Dutch photographer

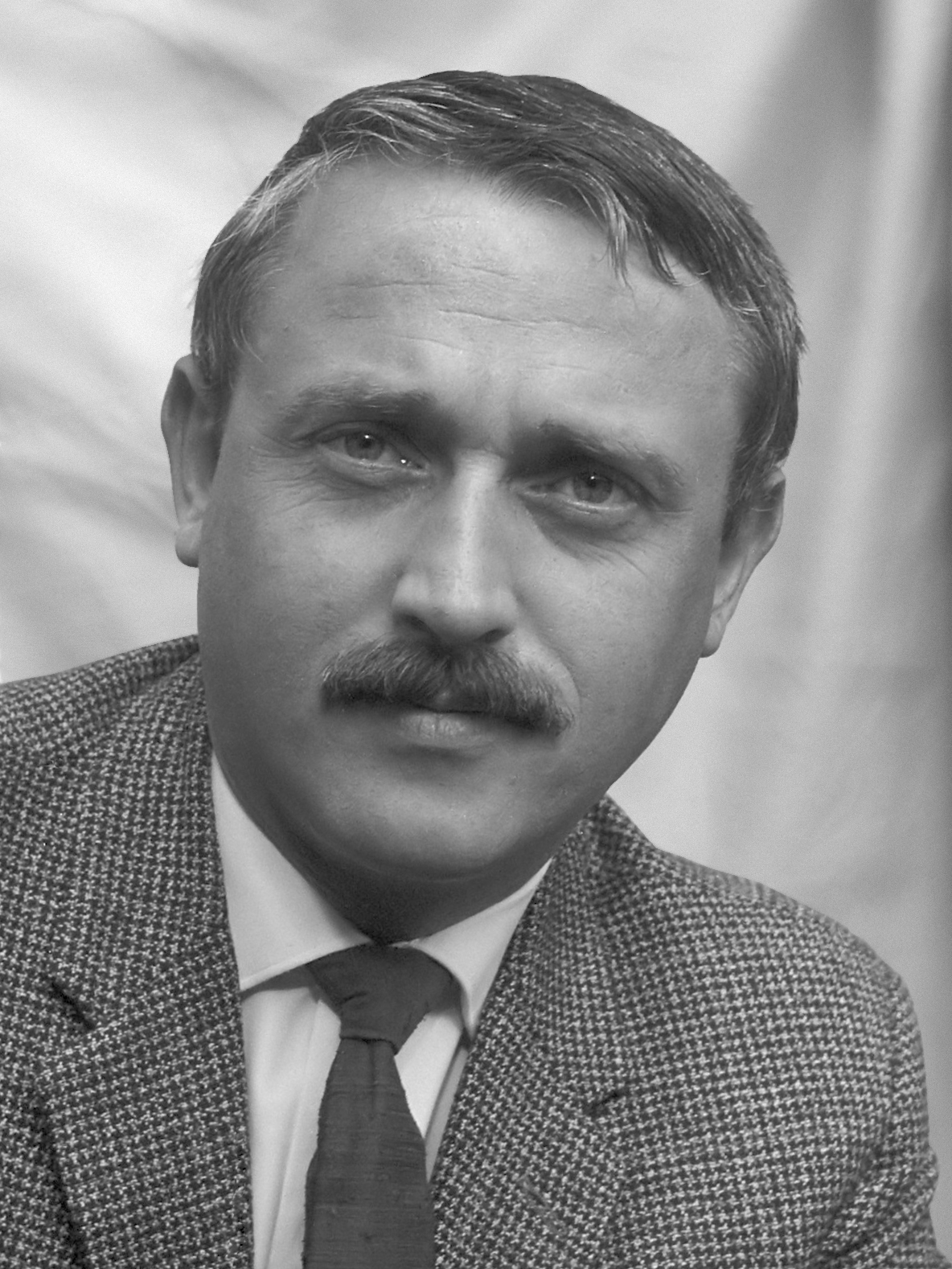
Self-portrait of Pot (17 October 1962)

Harry Pot (16 October 1929 – 16 March 1996) was a Dutch photographer and cinematographer. He was one of the most prolific professional photographers in Dutch history.

== Biography ==
Born on 16 October 1929, Pot began working for the Dutch press agency Anefo in 1950. He travelled abroad to photograph events such as the 1960 Summer Olympics in Rome.

In 1970 he left ANEFO and moved to the Keizersgracht in Amsterdam. He later opened the studio Bentveld, where he worked with photographer Henk Jonker. He remained active until 1985.

Pot died on 16 March 1996, aged 66. He is buried in Westerveld.

Over 24,000 of his photos are on the Dutch National Archives website.

== Photography ==
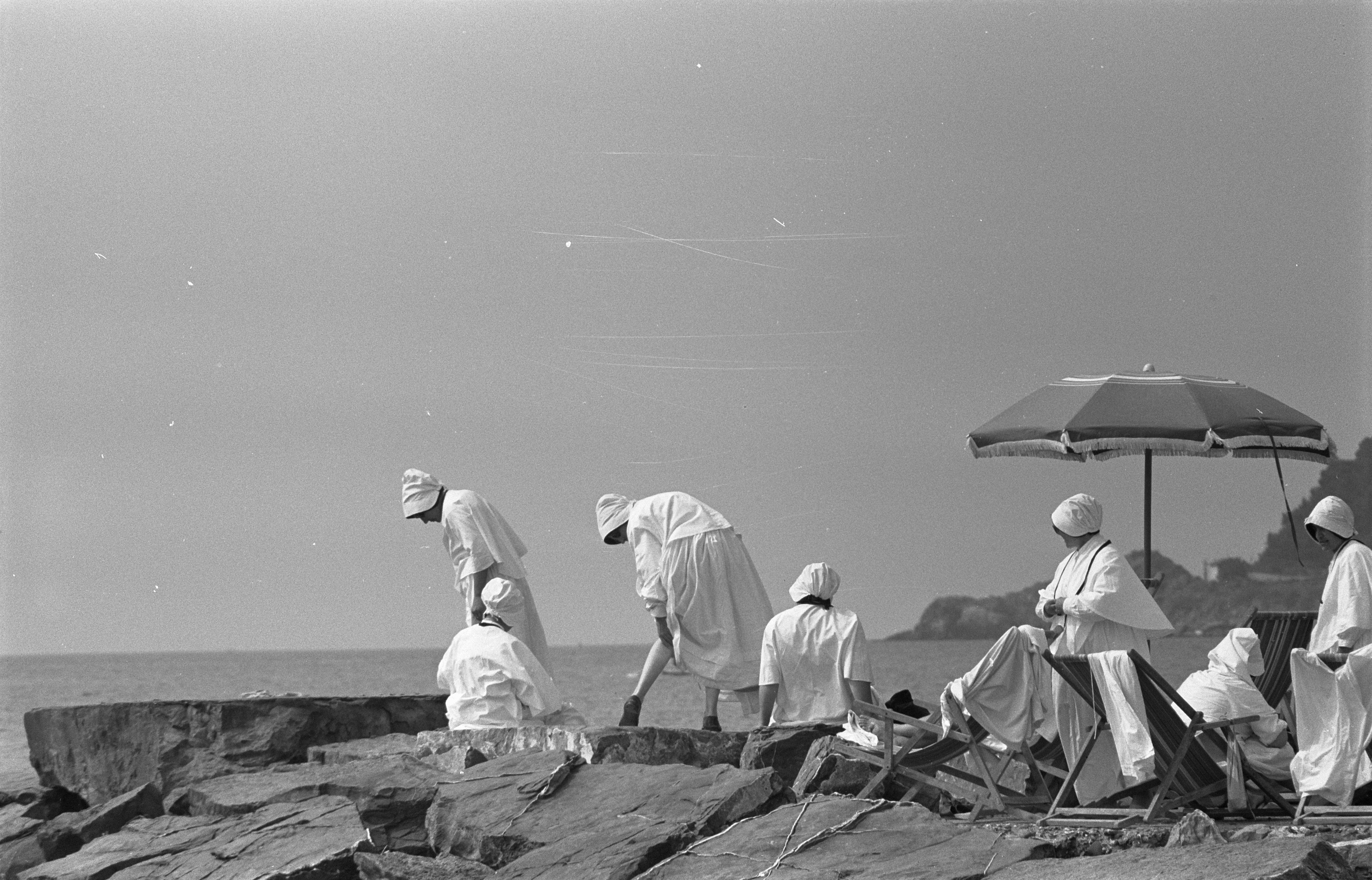
Photo from the series of the Italian nuns in 1959 at the beach

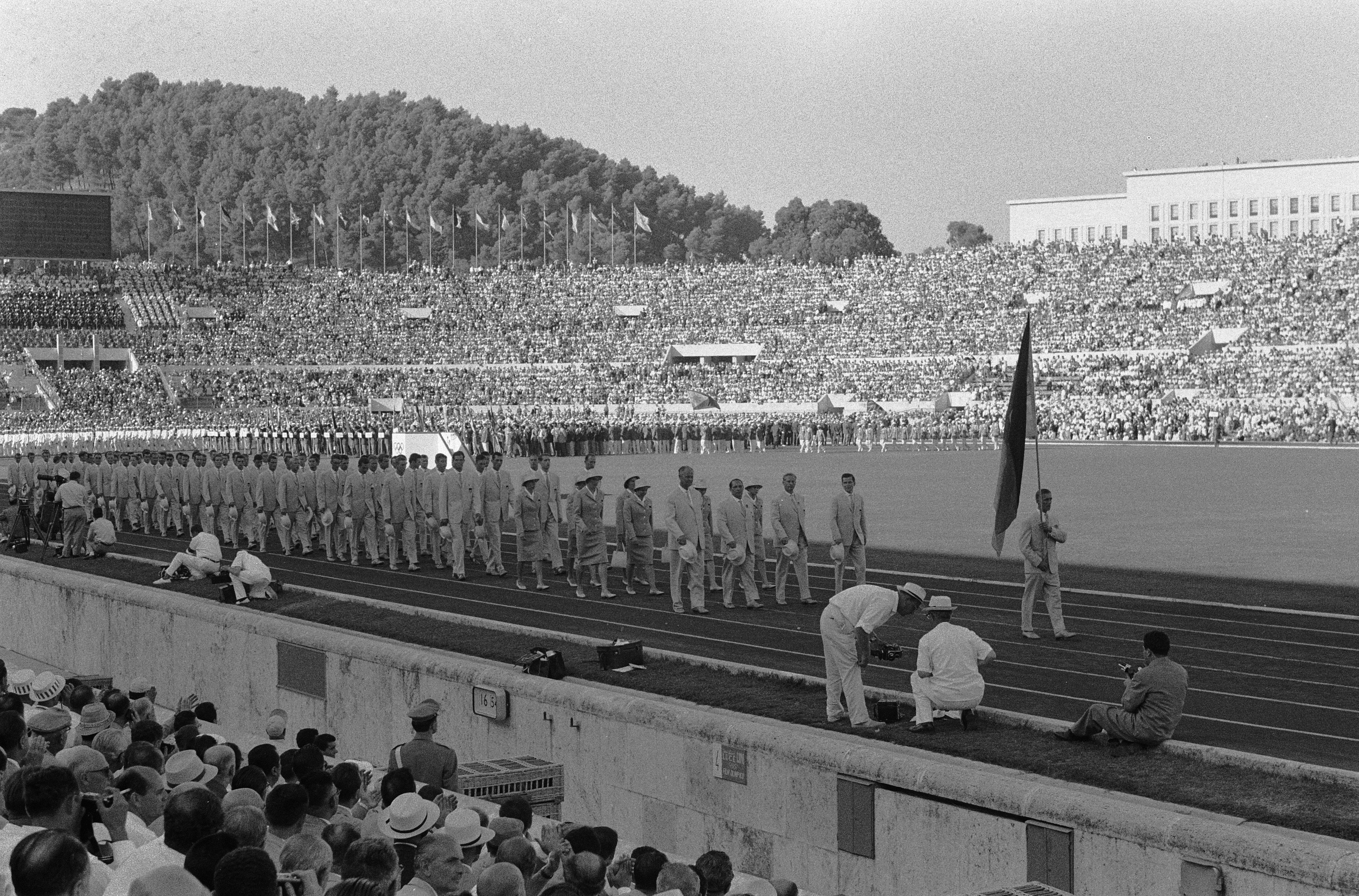
Opening of the 1960 Summer Olympics

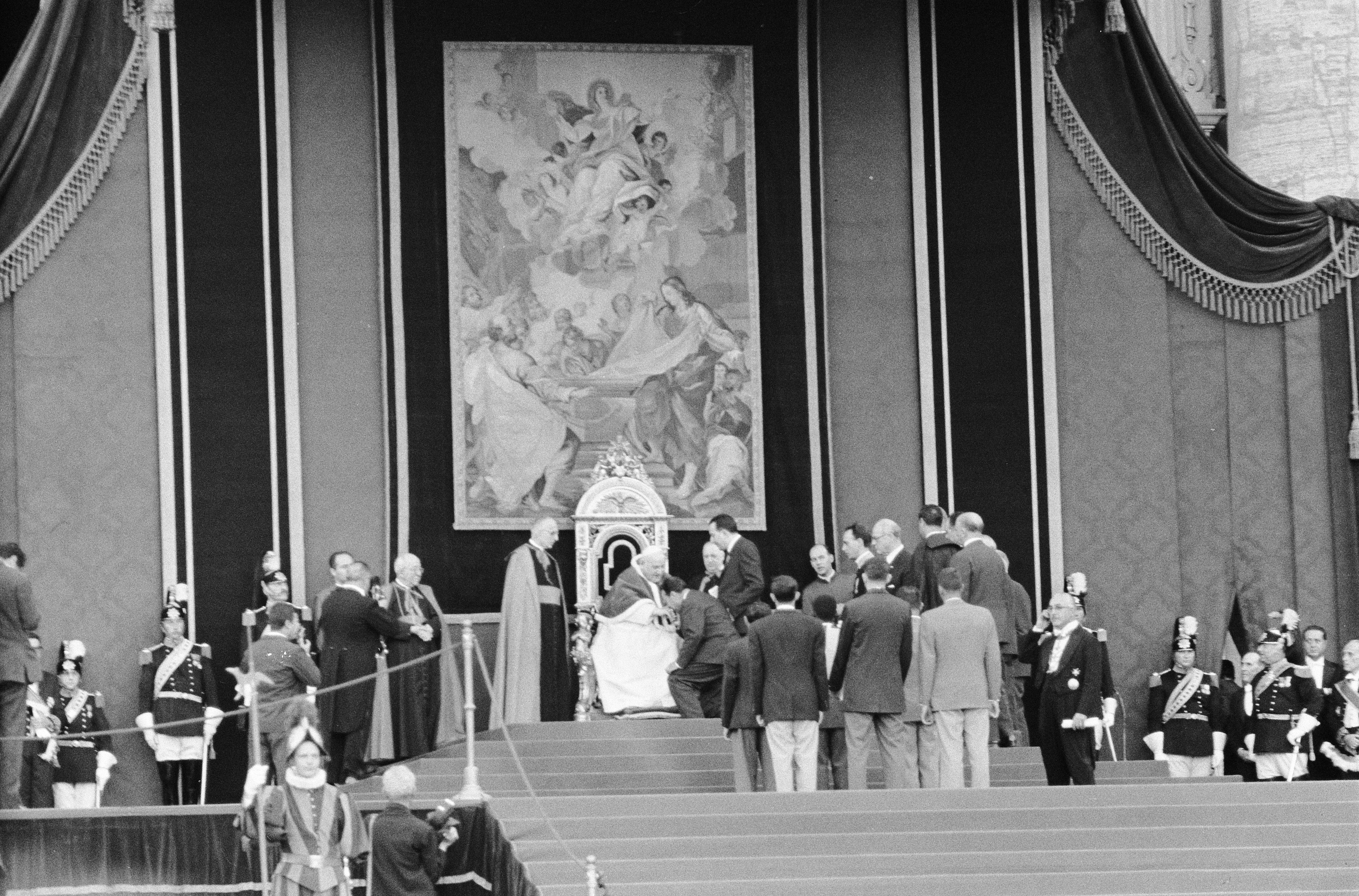
Pope John XXIII greeting the athletes at the opening of the 1960 Summer Olympics

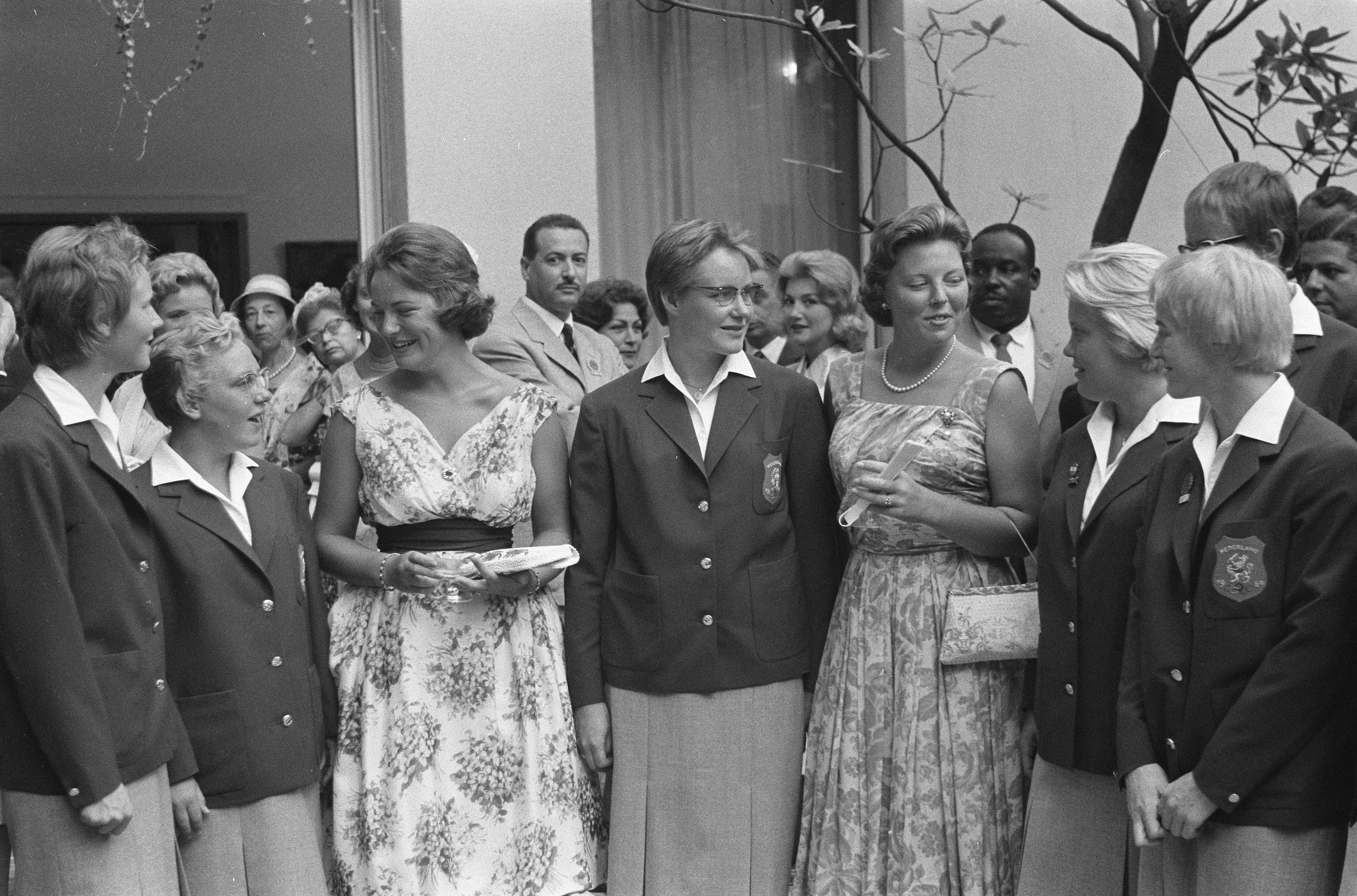
Beatrix of the Netherlands and Princess Irene in Rome in 1960

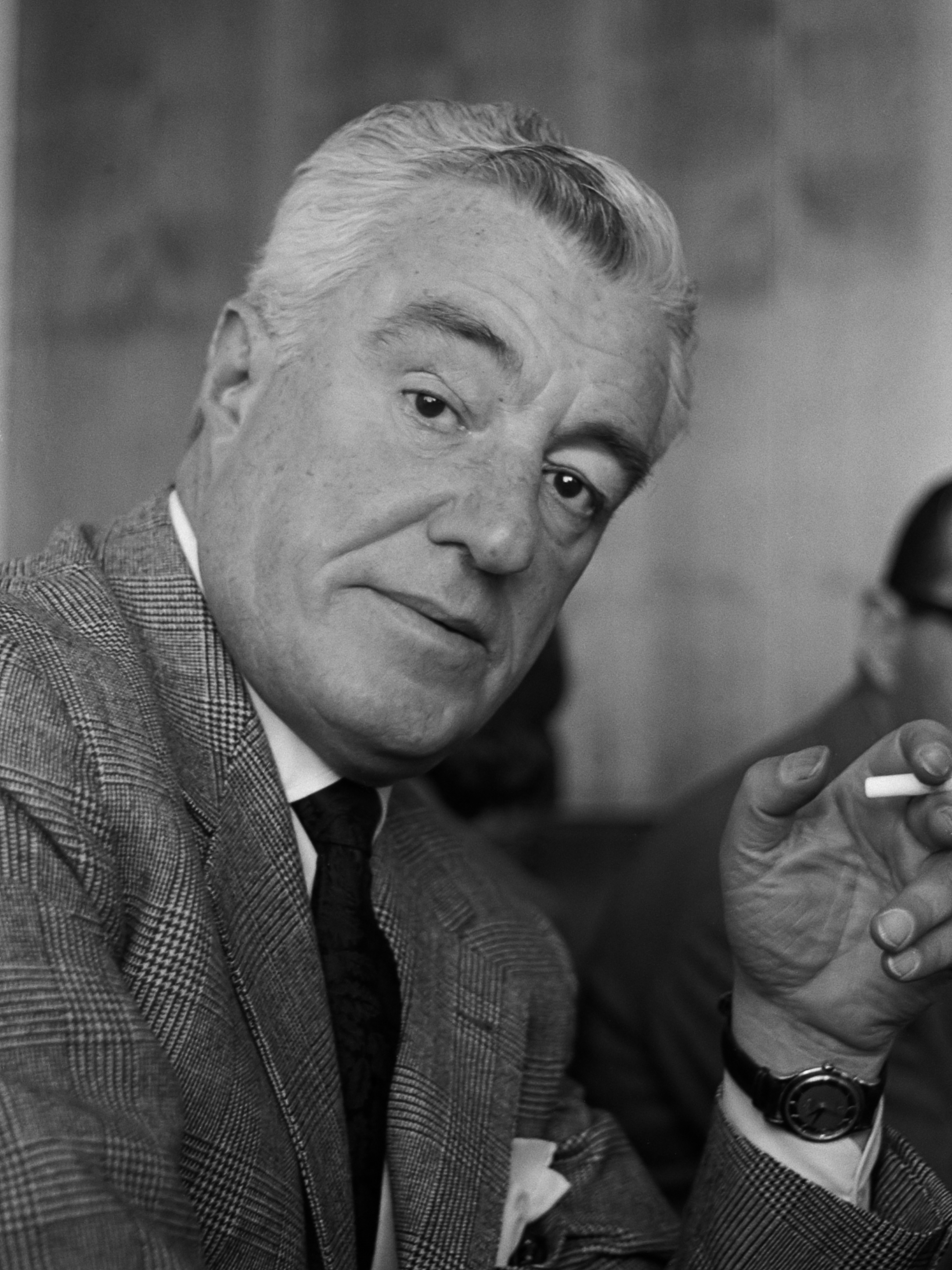
Vittorio De Sica in 1962

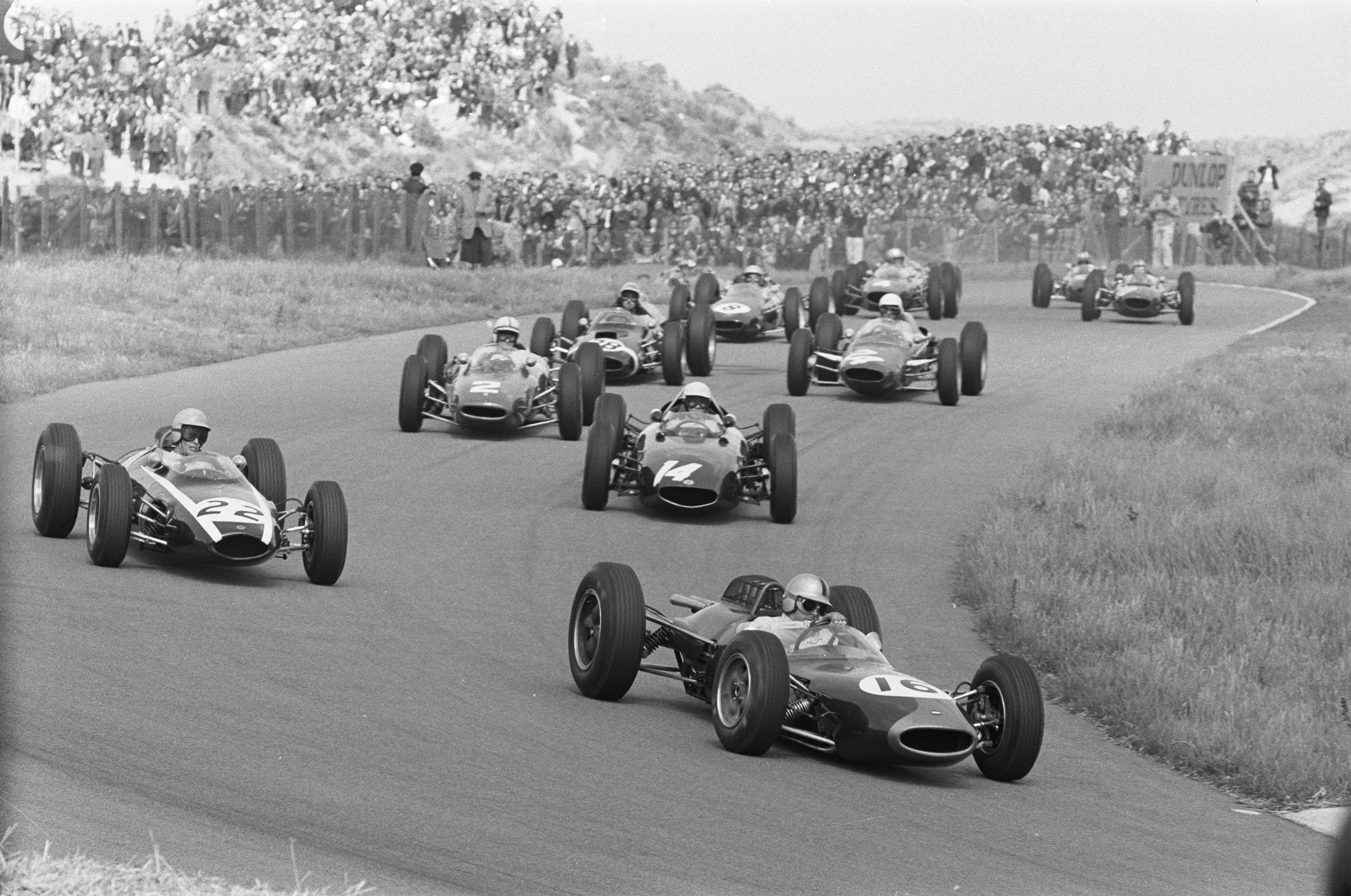
Drivers at 1963 Dutch Grand Prix

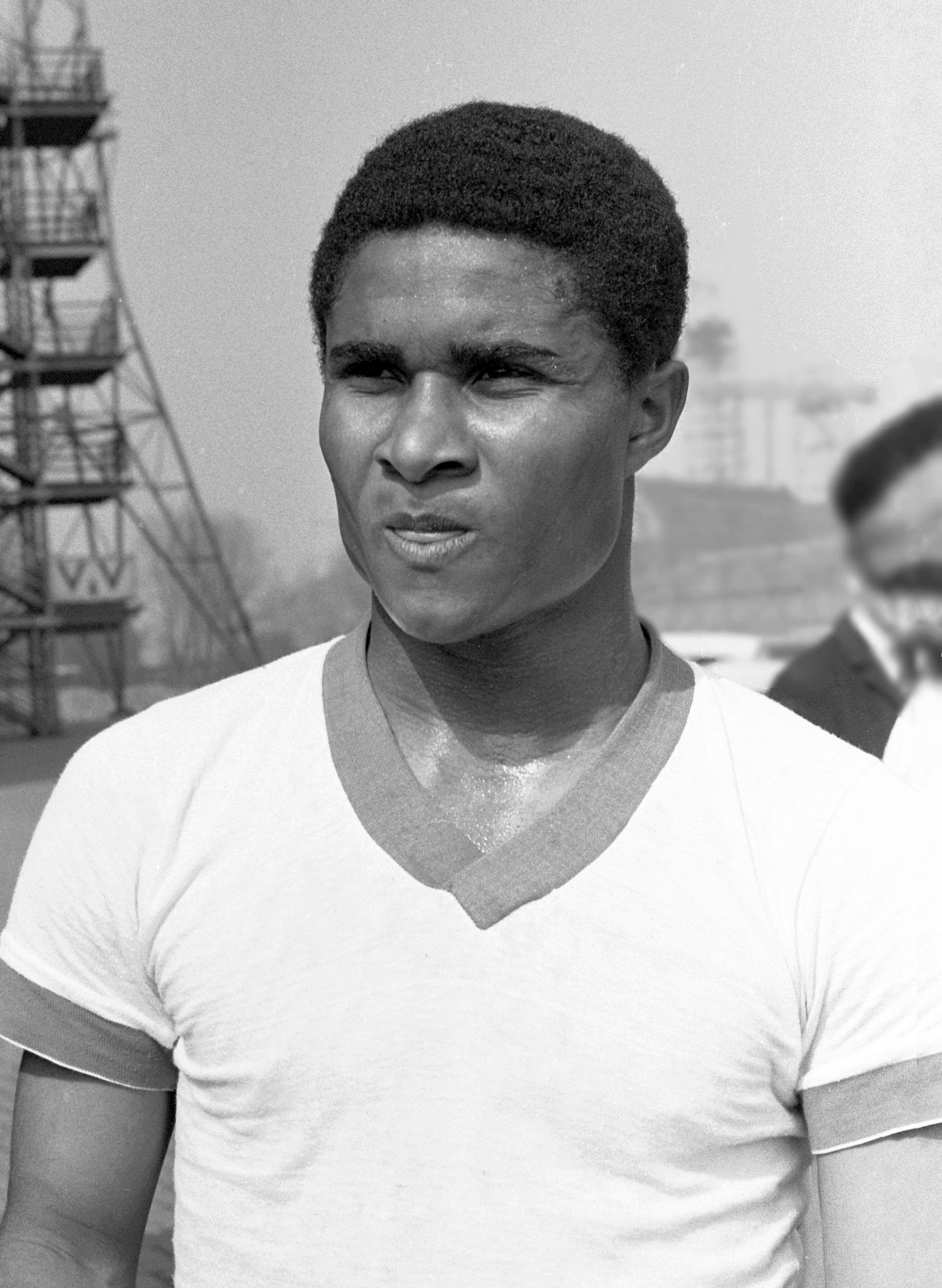
Eusébio in 1963

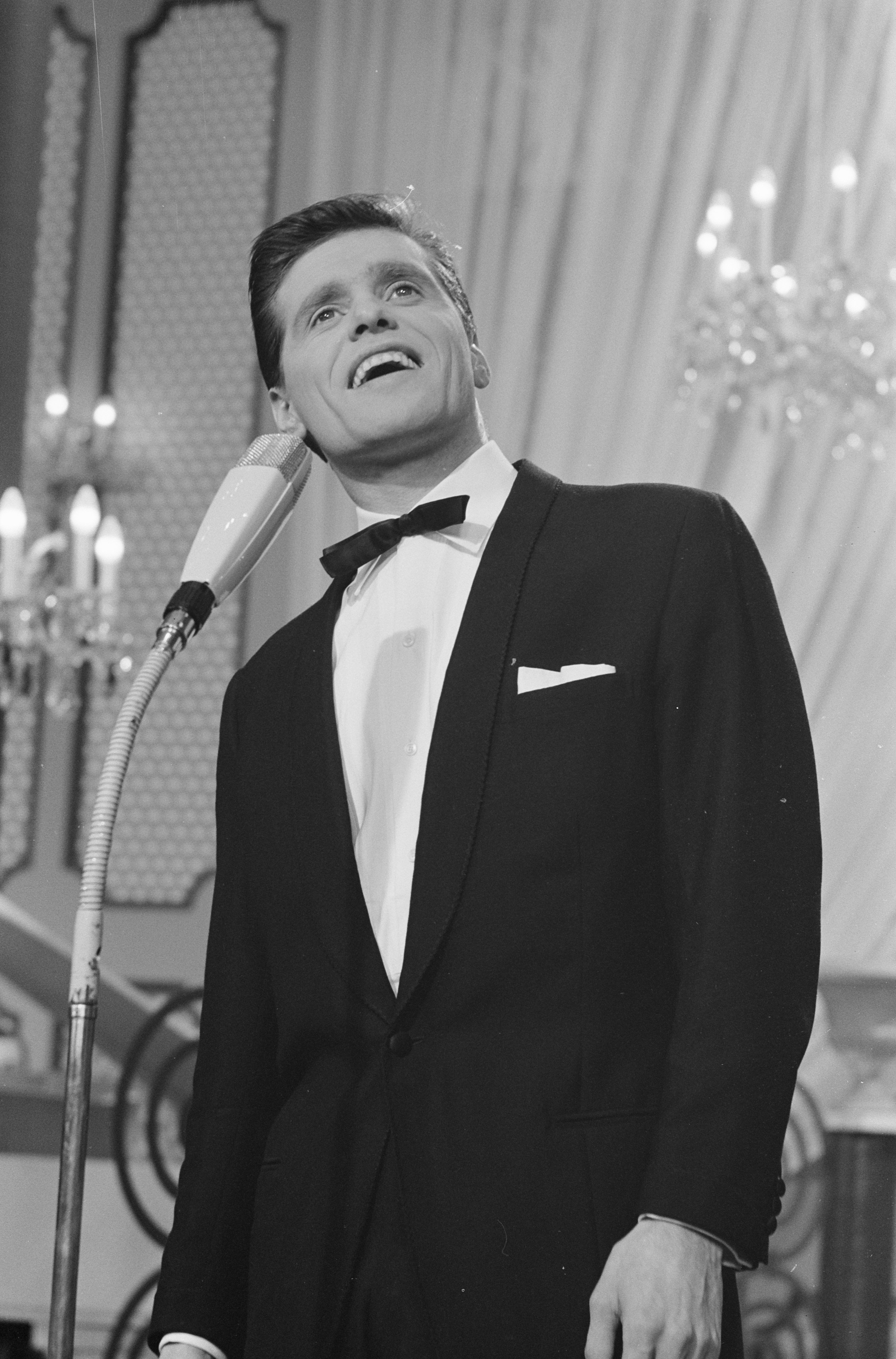
Ronnie Carroll at the Eurovision Song Contest 1962
