= Maria Austria =

Austro-Dutch photographer

- Henk Jonker (1946) Maria Austria with Rolleiflex camera
- Born: Marie Karoline Oeststreicher; 19 March 1915; Karlovy Vary
- Died: 10 January 1975 (aged 59); Amsterdam
- Education: Bauhaus Dessau, Höhere Graphische Bundes-Lehr- und Versuchsanstalt
- Known for: Photography, Photojournalism
- Movement: Neorealism (art), Humanist photography
- Spouses: Hans Bial; Henk Jonker

Maria Austria (née Marie Karoline Oeststreicher; 19 March 1915 in Karlovy Vary – 10 January 1975 in Amsterdam) was an Austro-Dutch photographer who is considered an important post-war photographer of the Netherlands, and was a theatre and documentary photographer. Her neorealistic, humanist photo reportage was exhibited at the Museum of Modern Art in 1953, the Stedelijk Museum Amsterdam in 1958, the Van Gogh Museum in 1975, and the Joods Historisch Museum in 2001.

== Career ==
=== 1915 to 1936 ===
Marie Karoline Oestreicher grew up in what was then the Bohemian monarchy Karlsbad, the daughter of Austrian doctor Karl, who died young (1864 – March 1915) and his wife Clara, née Kisch (1871–1945), sibling of the older Felix (1894–1945) and Lisbeth (1902–1989). The Jewish family was middle-class in an intellectual and artistic environment. She had Austrian citizenship until 1918, and then Czechoslovak citizenship. From 1928 to June 1933, she attended the local girls' high school, from which she graduated with very good grades.

During this time she began taking photographs. From the summer of 1933 she lived in the Rathausstrasse, Vienna. She bought a Leica and a Rolleiflex and began a three-year apprenticeship as a photographer on September 18 the Graphic Teaching and Research Institute Vienna - Department of Photography and Reproduction Processes, including an internship from February 1934 to July 1935 in the Viennese Willinger's photo studio on Kärntnerstrasse. After graduating with "very good" on July 4, 1936, she worked as a freelance photographer. She was interested in culture, attended avant-garde theatre productions and small experimental theatres and found inspiration in the circles of left-wing artists and actors around the Naschmarkt.

=== 1937 to 1945 ===
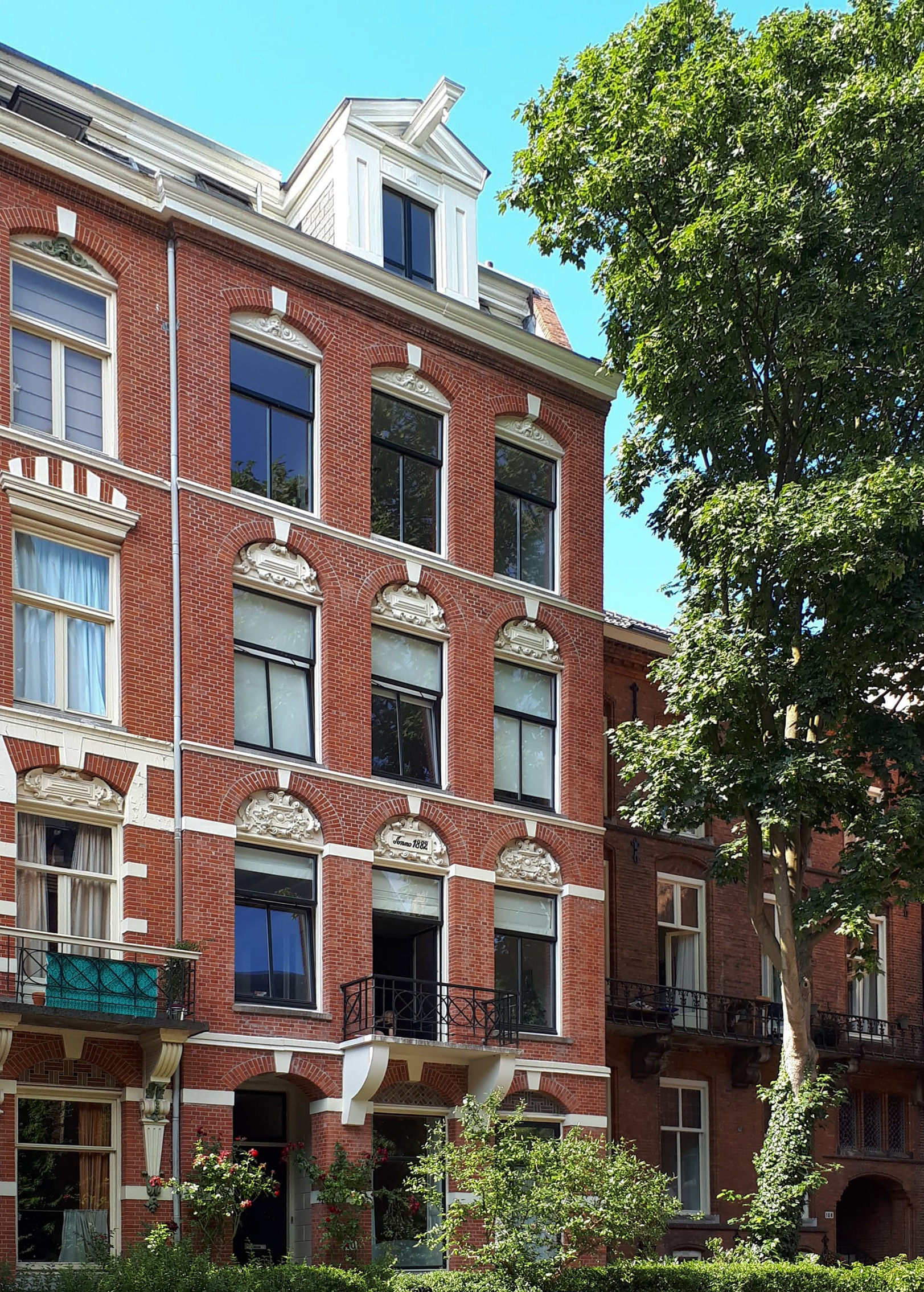
Vondelstraat 110, Amsterdam

In the summer of 1937 she left Austria because of the increasing influence of the Nazi Germany and the growing anti-Semitism and moved to the Netherlands to live with her sister Lisbeth, who, after training as a textile designer at the Bauhaus Dessau had settled in Amsterdam. Accustomed to demand for her work in Vienna, Maria first had to develop a reputation in Amsterdam. She learned Dutch, took any small job, and from the beginning of 1938 photographed her sister's designs in their joint studio "Model en Foto Austria" (Fashion and Photo Studio Austria), and carried out advertising and portrait commissions. She developed her negatives herself, produced reportage and slowly established business with magazines. She published in the magazines Libelle and Wij and made contacts with politically and culturally like-minded people in the Nederlandsche Film League.

During this time she met the directors Joris Ivens and John Fernhout and the Hungarian photographer Éva Besnyö. With the move to the Noorder Amstellaan in the Rivierenbuurt district in 1939 she only used nom-de-plume 'Maria Austria.' After the invasion of the Netherlands on May 10, 1940, and the occupation by the German Wehrmacht, the living conditions for Jewish people became increasingly difficult due to the growing reprisals during the German occupation such as compulsory registration for Jews, exclusion from public life, exclusion from associations, professional and writing bans. As she was affected by the occupational ban for Jewish photographers, Austria had to give up her job in May 1941 and began working as a nurse in the Portuguese-Israelite Hospital on the Rapenburg peninsula in the Jodenbuurt, and as a photography teacher for the Judenrat of Amsterdam. In April 1942 entered a marriage of convenience with the German-Jewish merchant Hans Bial (1911–2000) that ended in divorce in December 1945. Her sister Lisbeth was interned in Westerbork Camp in 1942, as was her mother and brother and family in 1943, who had fled to the Netherlands in 1938. Maria Austria went into hiding, changing accommodation from mid-1943 and began to work for the Dutch Resistance. During this time, while hiding in the attic of the house at Vondelstraat 110 in Amsterdam, she met her future husband Hendrik (“Henk”) Pieter Jonker, whom she taught to take photographs. Jonker worked as an official for the Amsterdam population register.

Together with him and other Jewish photographers such as Éva Besnyö, they produced false identity cards for the resistance and Maria took on courier services under the pseudonym Elizabeth Huijnen. Her mother was sent in April 1945 to the KZ Bergen-Belsen, her brother Felix and his wife died shortly afterwards as a result of imprisonment in Belsen. Lisbeth survived in Westerbork and took in the three orphaned nieces Beate, Helly and Maria, whom she looked after with Maria Austria.

=== From 1945 ===
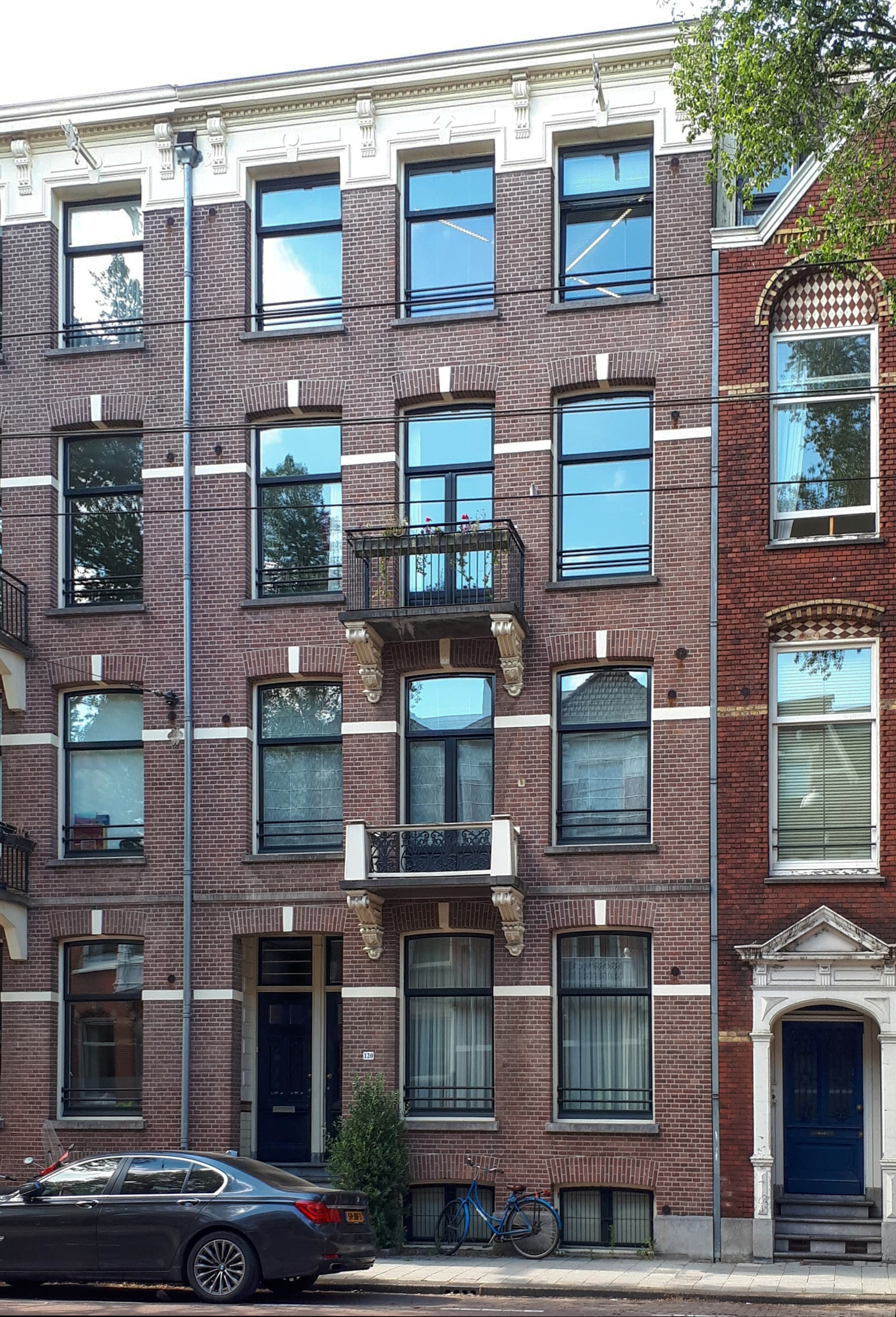
Willemsparkweg 120, Amsterdam

After the war she accepted commissions for fashion reports and founded the photo agency Particam (Partisan Camera) at Willemsparkweg 120, Amsterdam with Henk Jonker, Aart Klein and Wim Zilver on 4 May 1945. The Canadian Allies initially supplied them with film stock for the documentation of life in the devastated cities. With the permission of the National Armed Forces, socially critical photo stories on the reconstruction and misery amongst the population were produced for the Dutch free press.

On 1 September 1945 Emmy Andriesse, Maria Austria, Eva Besnyö, Carel Blazer, Charles Breijer, Violette Cornelius, Es Elenbaas, Cok de Graaff, Paul Huf, Henk Jonker, Aart Klein, Cas Oorthuys, Sem Presser, Annelies Romein, Hans Sibbelee, Kryn Taconis, Ad Windig and Hans Wolf founded the Department of Photographers of the GKf; the Vereniging van Beoefenaars der Gebonden Kunsten (Association of Practitioners of the Bonded Arts). In this capacity, she campaigned for the recognition of photography as a legitimate art discipline and lobbied the Ministry of Education, Art and Science for a separate fund in the state budget for the purchase and exhibition of photographs in museums. She insisted on attribution when publishing her photos in magazines and forbade the cropping of her pictures. It was to be a lasting and influential organisation supporting photographers rights and interests; in 1968 the Association of Practitioners of the Bound Arts GKf split into five associations and the Professional Association of Photographers GKf was founded; and in 2014, GKf merged with the professional association for socially engaged photography, Dupho (DutchPhotographers). She was also a member of the "Nederlandse Vereniging van Photojournalists" (Association of Dutch Photojournalists).

In 1954 with Cas Oorthuys, Emmy Andriesse, Carl Blazer, Ed van der Elsken, Henk Jonker and several others Maria met MoMA curator of photography Edward Steichen in the studio of photographer Paul Huf in which Steichen outlined plans for his global exhibition The Family of Man and looked at their photographs. Six Dutch photographers who had attended the meeting at Paul Huf's studio were included in The Family of Man, but not Maria Austria, despite the humanist ethos of her imagery and although her work had appeared in Steichen's 1953 Post-war European Photography.

From 1949 to the early 1960s, Maria Austria and Jonker were given a page on the back of the Algemeen Handelsblad with a photo section on changing social themes. The couple also photographed people from the performing arts in the Netherlands for program booklets and theatre showcases. They were invited to document the first performances in the Stadsschouwburg Amsterdam. From 1947, the Holland Festival in Amsterdam became an important client. They also photographed performances in De Nationale Opera from 1949, the Dutch Opera Foundation (De Nederlandse Operastichting)) and orchestras, such as the Concertgebouw from 1951.

In March 1950, Maria Austria married Henk Jonker and was naturalized as Dutch. Increasingly she concentrated on reporting on theater performances and experimental music and dance performances, opera and ballet productions. After Wim Zilver Rupe and Aart Klein left in 1956 and Henk Jonker divorced in 1963, she continued to run the Particam office on her own, employing assistants and apprentices including Vincent Mentzel, Jaap Pieper and Bob van Dantzig. The marriage to Henk Jonker was dissolved on October 28, 1969.

Until her death in 1975, she was the in-house photographer at the Mickery Theatre which had been based in Amsterdam since 1972, a venue for international, alternative experimental theater and one of the most important stages for free ensembles in Europe. For the Holland Festival and Mickery Theater, she photographed the receptions and rehearsals during the day, the performances or concerts in the evening and then developed the photos in order to deliver them to the national newspapers and agencies in the morning before going to press. The photos of the high-profile performances brought her national fame.

== Style ==
Maria Austria's style of photography is Neorealist and part of the post-war Humanist Photography movement. Uninfluenced by avant-garde trends, she renounced artistic alienation and created "straight photographs that capture the social contradictions of the post-war period". She was known for her perfectionism and craftsmanship. Her pictures “are razor-sharp and characterized by strong contrasts. You can see every little wrinkle. She seems to capture the people and the events directly."

From 1937 she took the fashion photos in the Amsterdam studio exclusively with a Rolleiflex. She justified her preference with the fact that "even with the Rolleiflex you are much more mobile than with a large box". She used a Rolleiflex camera until the 1970s, for which she had a cover made in order to be able to take pictures as quietly as possible during theater and dance performances. She often worked with a tripod and her own lighting and, working from experience, even in difficult lighting situations without a photometer. Only shortly before her death did she take pictures with a 35mm camera.

Even in her pictures from the training period in Vienna, Maria Austria's leaning toward social reporting is evident. She photographed workers playing cards in Vienna, girls at the lake, glassblowers in Bohemia and their everyday lives. As a freelance photographer in Vienna, she photographed celebrities from the international art scene, such as Benjamin Britten, Maria Callas, Josephine Baker, Martha Graham and also Albert Schweitzer. After she went into hiding in Amsterdam in 1943, she secretly photographed German troops in the streets from her hiding place in the Vondelstraat from the attic window.

For her photo agency Particam (Partizanen Camera), founded in 1945, she made socially critical photo-reportage, such as on the Hongerwinter 1944/45, the return of Jewish inmates from the Westerbork camp in 1945, the arrest of Dutch collaborators, on the children's camp for Jewish Romanian orphans Ilaniah in Apeldoorn in 1948 and of the "Asocial camp" in Drenthe, in which the Dutch government housed socially disadvantaged families and forced them to do hard labor for the purpose of "resocialization" until 1950. She documented the destruction of the Amsterdam Centraal Station, the misery after the war, the reconstruction and life in the liberated Netherlands, as well as the flood disaster of 1953.

In December 1954, she and Jonker, through Otto Frank and mediated by the theater director Rob de Vries, were commissioned to document the hiding place of Anne Frank and her family at Prinsengracht 263. Jonker photographed the front of the building and Maria Austria took over 250 shots of the rear of Het Achterhuis. The photo documentation was the basis for the construction of the scenery for the theatre production on Broadway in 1955 and the 1959 film adaptation The Diary of Anne Frank. In 1958 her photos were shown in a solo exhibition at the Stedelijk Museum in Amsterdam.

In addition to social reports, in the years after the war she took many portrait photos of intellectuals and artists of her time, including Bertolt Brecht, Thomas Mann, Igor Stravinsky, Mstislav Rostropovich, James Baldwin. Increasingly she devoted herself to theatre, music, dance and circus photography, concentrating on reporting on theatrical performances and experimental music and dance performances, photographing many opera and ballet productions, famous guest conductors and soloists, most notably at the Holland Festival in Amsterdam and as in-house photographer of the experimental Mickery Theater. She photographed the guest performances of the post-war avant-garde of the stage world, such as the troupe of La MaMa Experimental Theater Club from New York and the performances of the Tenjo Sajiki Theater founded by Shÿji Terayama. She photographed the actors candidly during their performance, resulting in expressive and sometimes blurry images that convey a dynamic and haunting impression. Her strictly composed black and white photographs were characterized by their combination of precision and expressiveness that captured the emotions staged on stage.

Maria Austria was also interested in the socio-political theatre that was formed in the Netherlands in the early 1970s. She photographed the performances of the theatre collective Het Werkteater founded in 1970 and the theatre groups Prolog, Baal and Sater, in which she was also personally involved. She was also fascinated by expressive, existential, new forms of expression in dance. She tried to reflect the beauty and perfection she saw in the performances of Kurt Stuyf and Ellen Edinoff from the Contemporary Dance Foundation.

== Legacy ==
Maria Austria died on January 10, 1975, in Amsterdam after a bad flu. In 1976 the Stichting Fotoarchief Maria Austria-Particam (Foundation PhotoArchive Maria Austria-Particam) was set up to make her legacy accessible and at the same time to set up an archive for Dutch photographers. Renamed in 1992, the Maria Austria Institute (MAI) in Amsterdam is famous for its over 50 archives of important Dutch photographers, including the complete works of Eva Besnyö, Louis van Beurden, Carel Blazer, Hein de Bouter, Fred Brommet, Hans Buter, Hans Dukkers, Paul Huf, Frits Gerritsen, Henk Jonker, Wubbo de Jong, Wim van der Linden, Frits Lemaire, Philip Mechanicus, Wim Meischke, Boudewijn Neuteboom, Ad Petersen, Jaap Pieper, Arjé Plas, Sem Presser, Kees Scherer, Robert Schlingemann, Nico van der Stam, Waldo van Suchtelen, Ed Suister, Jan Versnel, Johan Vigeveno, Ad Windig, Bram Wisman, Eli van Zachten, Wim Zilver Rupe, Maria Austria, and the KLM Archive. The archive is now housed in the Stadsarchief Amsterdam.

The Amsterdam Fund for the Arts awards the Maria Austria Prize for Photography every two years.

== Exhibitions (selection) ==
- 1953: Post-war European Photography. Museum of Modern Art, New York
- 1958: Maria Austria Exhibition. Stedelijk Museum, Amsterdam (solo exhibition)
- 1975: In memory of Maria Austria - theatre photography. Van Gogh Museum, Amsterdam
- 1977: the Maria Austria exhibition in the Stedelijk Museum is taken overto Amstelveen, Hilversum and Arnhem.
- 1977: Theatre photos of Maria Austria. Schouwburg Gallery, Tilburg
- 1991: Model in Photo Austria. Dutch Textile Museum (Nederlands Textielmuseum), Tilburg
- 2001: Maria Austria - Holland zoned Haast. Joods Historical Museum, Amsterdam
- 2002: Maria Austria - Photographs from the 1950s and 1960s. The Hidden Museum, Berlin
- 2018: Maria Austria - Photographer. Joods Historical Museum, Amsterdam; The Hidden Museum, Berlin
- 2018/2019: Maria Austria - An Amsterdam Photographer of Neorealism. The Hidden Museum, Berlin. Selection with about one hundred black and white Photographs and documents from the exhibition at the Joods Historisch Museum, Amsterdam
- 2023/2024: Focus! Click! Maria Austria - Photographer in Exile. Jewish Museum Vienna, Vienna

== Literature (selection) ==
- Martien Frijns: Maria Austria. photographer. Exhibition catalogue, Verlag AFdH, Enschede 2018, ISBN 978-9072603890
- biography: Encyclopedia of Austrian Women, Volume 1. Ilse Korotin (ed.), Böhlau, Vienna 2015, ISBN 978-3205795902, p.=0ahUKEwic3-DukbvpAhXpsaQKHd7LBAkQ6AEIKDAA#v=onepage&q=%22Maria%20Austria%22&f=false 163
- Holland zone haast 4. Photo's by Maria Austria. Judith Herzberg (ed.), Maria Austria Institute, Verlag Voetnoot, Amsterdam 2001, ISBN 978-9071877544
- Kees Nieuwenhuijzen (ea): Maria Austria. Photos. Verlag De Bezige Bij, Amsterdam 1976, ISBN 90-234-5226-7
- Dörte Nicolaisen: Bauhäusler in exile in the Netherlands. In: Crossing borders: women, art and exile. Ursula Hudson-Wiedenmann, Beate Schmeichel-Falkenberg (eds.), Königshausen & Neumann, Würzburg 2005, ISBN 978-3826031472, p.hUKEwic3-DukbvpAhXpsaQKHd7LBAkQ6AEIQzAD#v=onepage&q=%22Maria%20Austria%22&f=false 29-33
- Oestreicher, Marie Karoline (1915-1975). In: Biographical Woordenboek van Nederland. Volume 5, The Hague 2002
