= Willem van de Poll =

Dutch photographer (1895–1970)

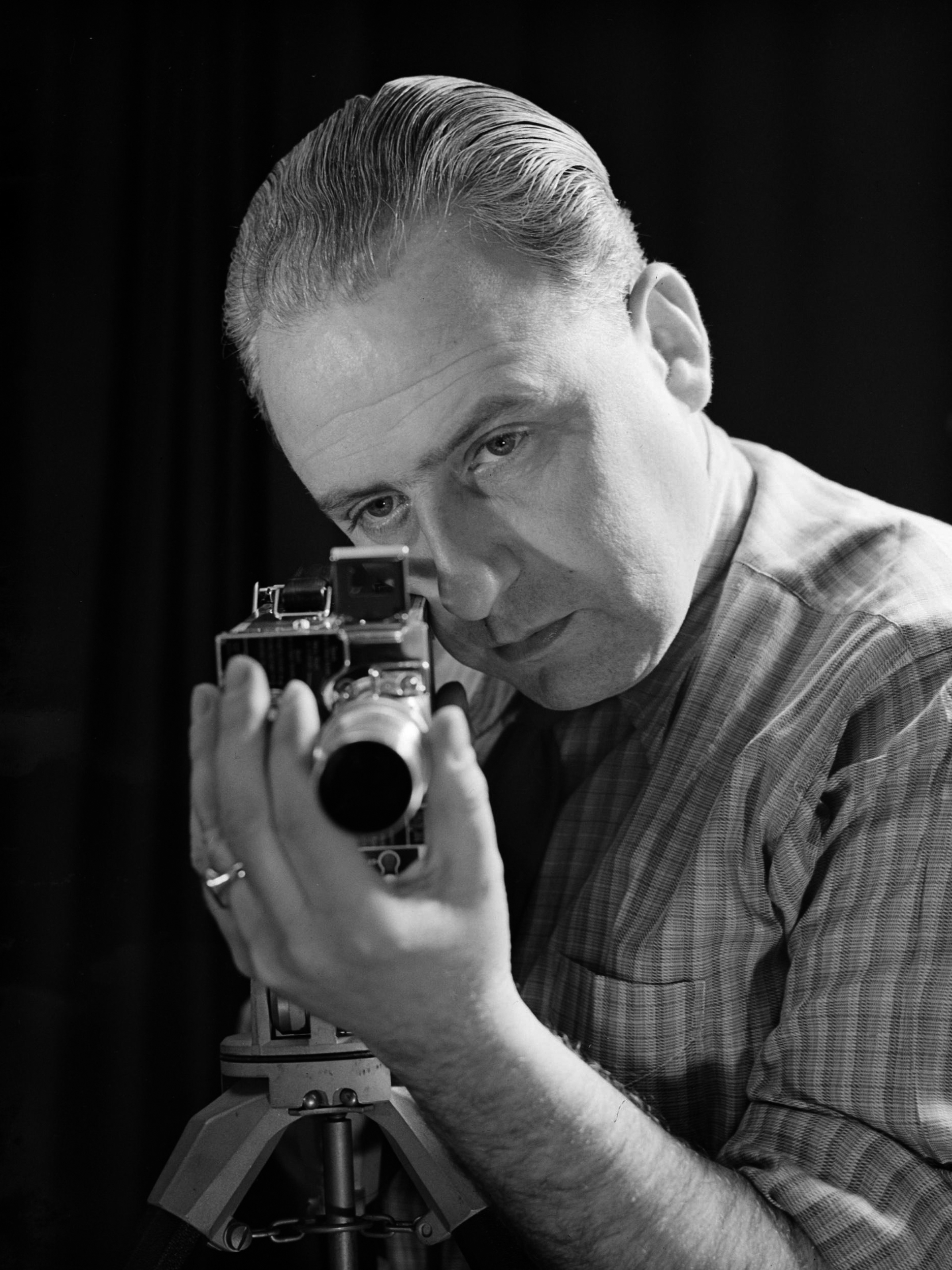
- Born: April 13, 1895; Amsterdam
- Died: December 10, 1970 (aged 75); Amsterdam
- Occupation: Photographer
- Employer: Anefo
- Known for: Being the official photographer of the royal house of the Netherlands from 1940s to the late 1950s

Willem van de Poll (April 13, 1895 – December 10, 1970) was a Dutch photographer, known for his photo reportage and for having become the official photographer of the Dutch reigning house.

== Biography ==
Born in Amsterdam on April 13, 1895, into a well-off family, he studied in Vienna right after the First World War and became the assistant of Alexander Korda.

Beginning his career with some press photos of a major fire published on the Berliner Tageblatt in 1920, he began to travel abroad extensively, becoming his most important feature. He worked with Associated Press and Black Star, and his press photo were published on all the most famous newspapers.

Particularly important were the travels in Italy in the 1930s and the beginning of the advertisement photography, working with many fashion and big companies across Europe.

In 1944 he was appointed to head the "photographic service" of the Dutch military forces. First, he became staff photographer of Prince Bernhard, the then commander-in-chief of the Interior Forces, and then he remained the royal house's photographer till the late 1950s. He employed also as a press photographer at the Anefo.

In the meanwhile he kept traveling around the world, particularly going to the newly founded state of Israel.

=== Van de Poll Archive ===
Due to the standard copyright law in many European countries, his photos would automatically become freely available 70 years after his death, in 2041, but many of them were donated in 1996 to the Nationaal Archief and 30,000 are available on Wikimedia Commons by CC0 license.

== Gallery ==
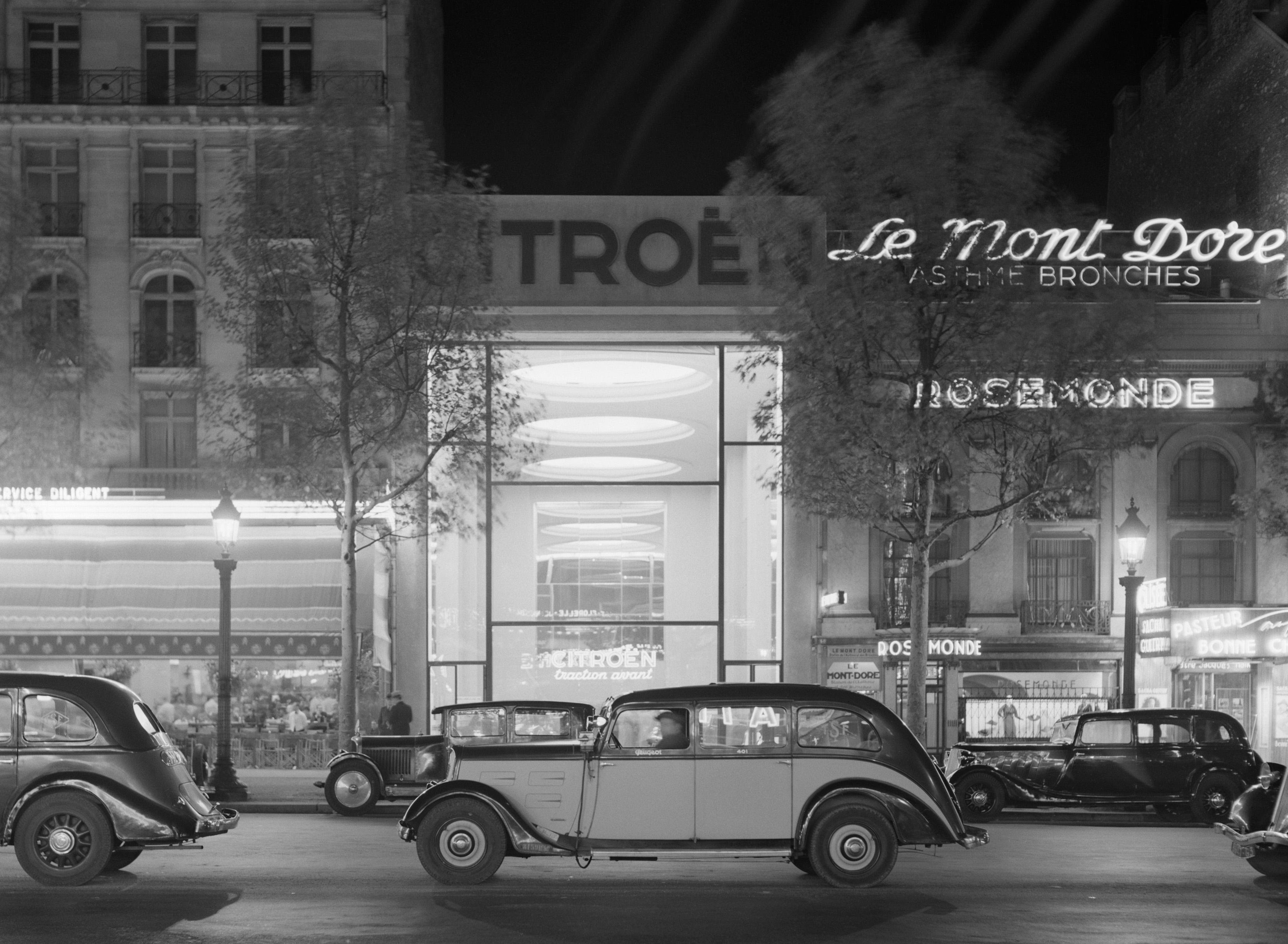
Champs-Elysées 1935.

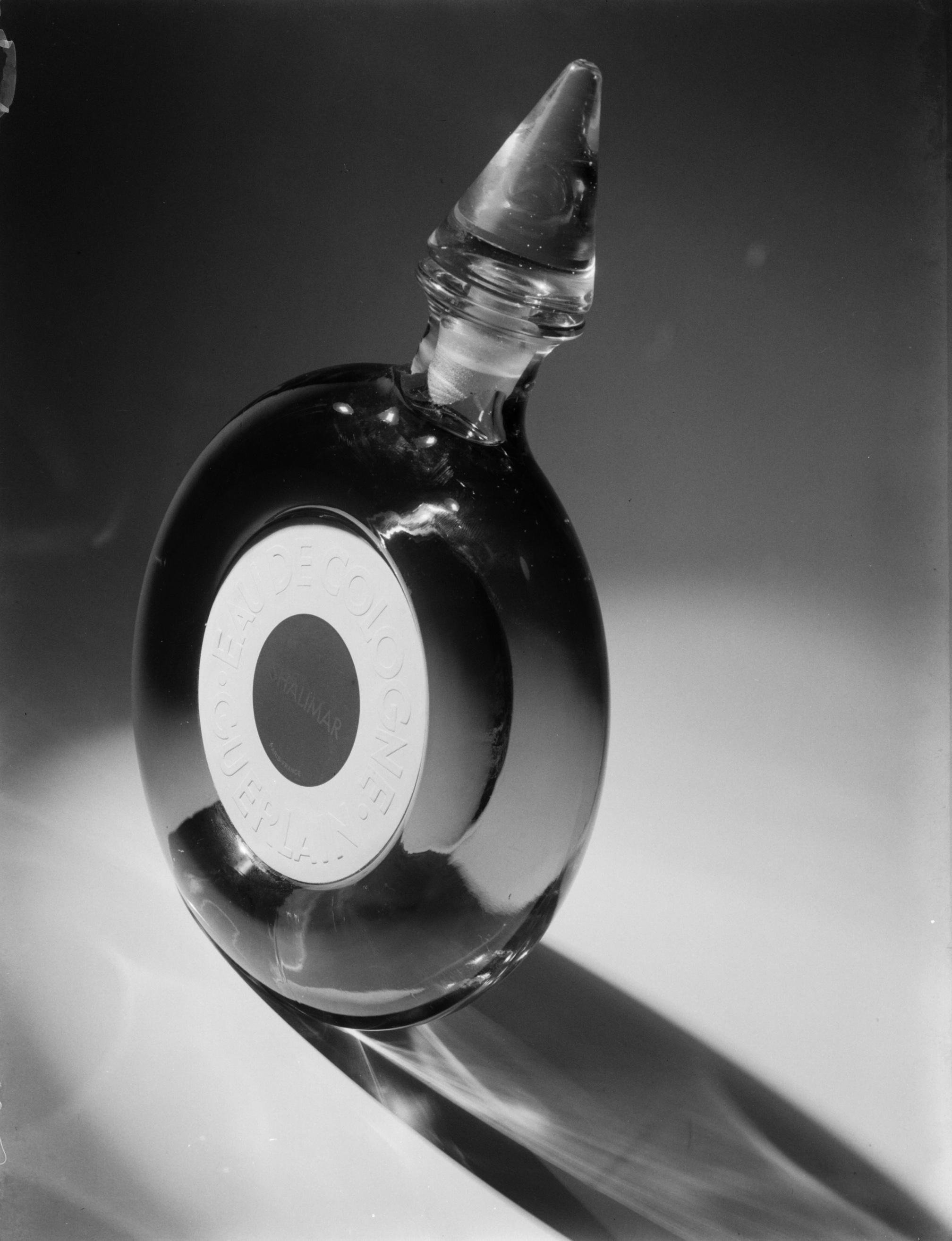
A commercial product photograph, 1936.

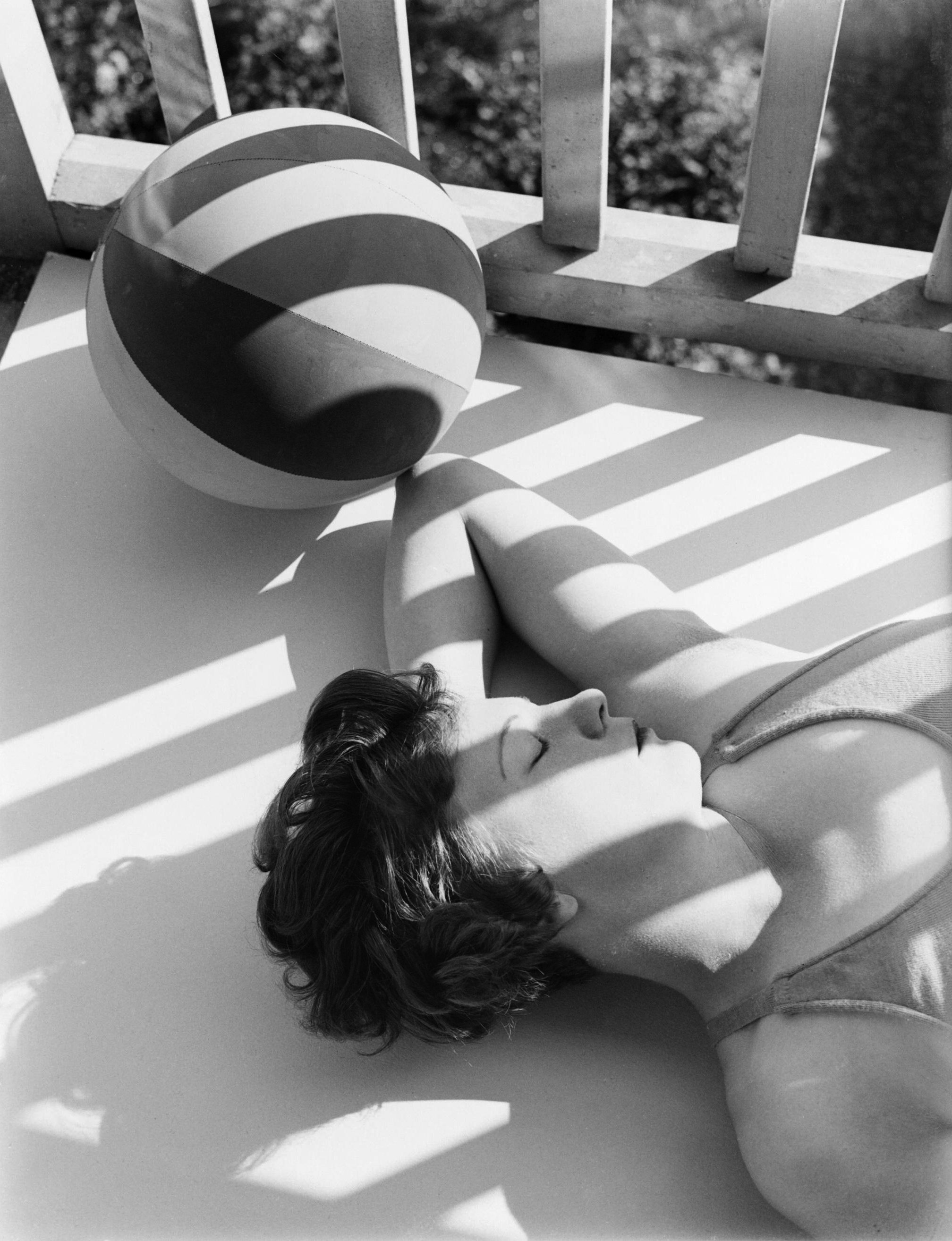
Model laid down, 1935, Netherlands.

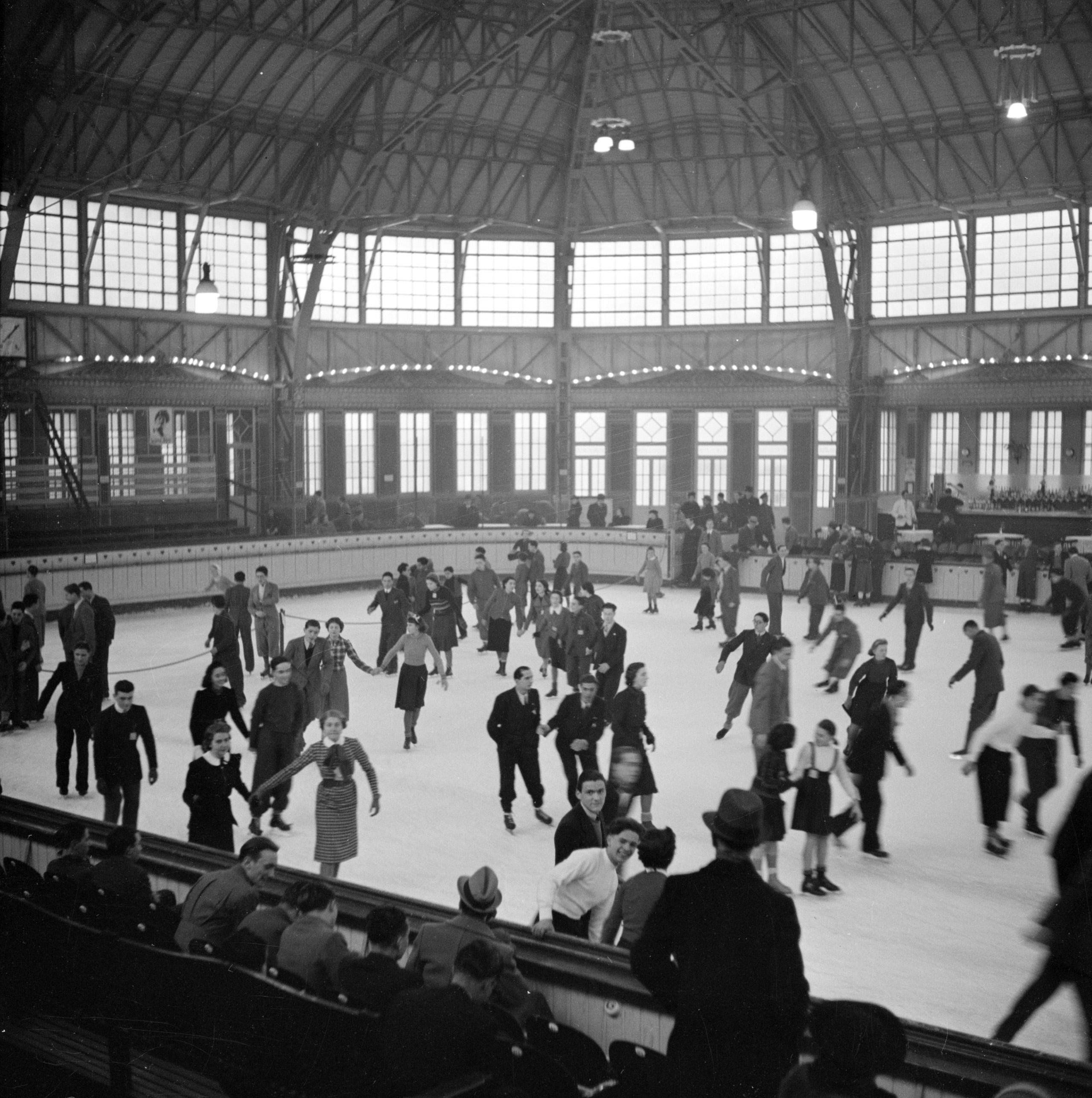
Milan, 1937.

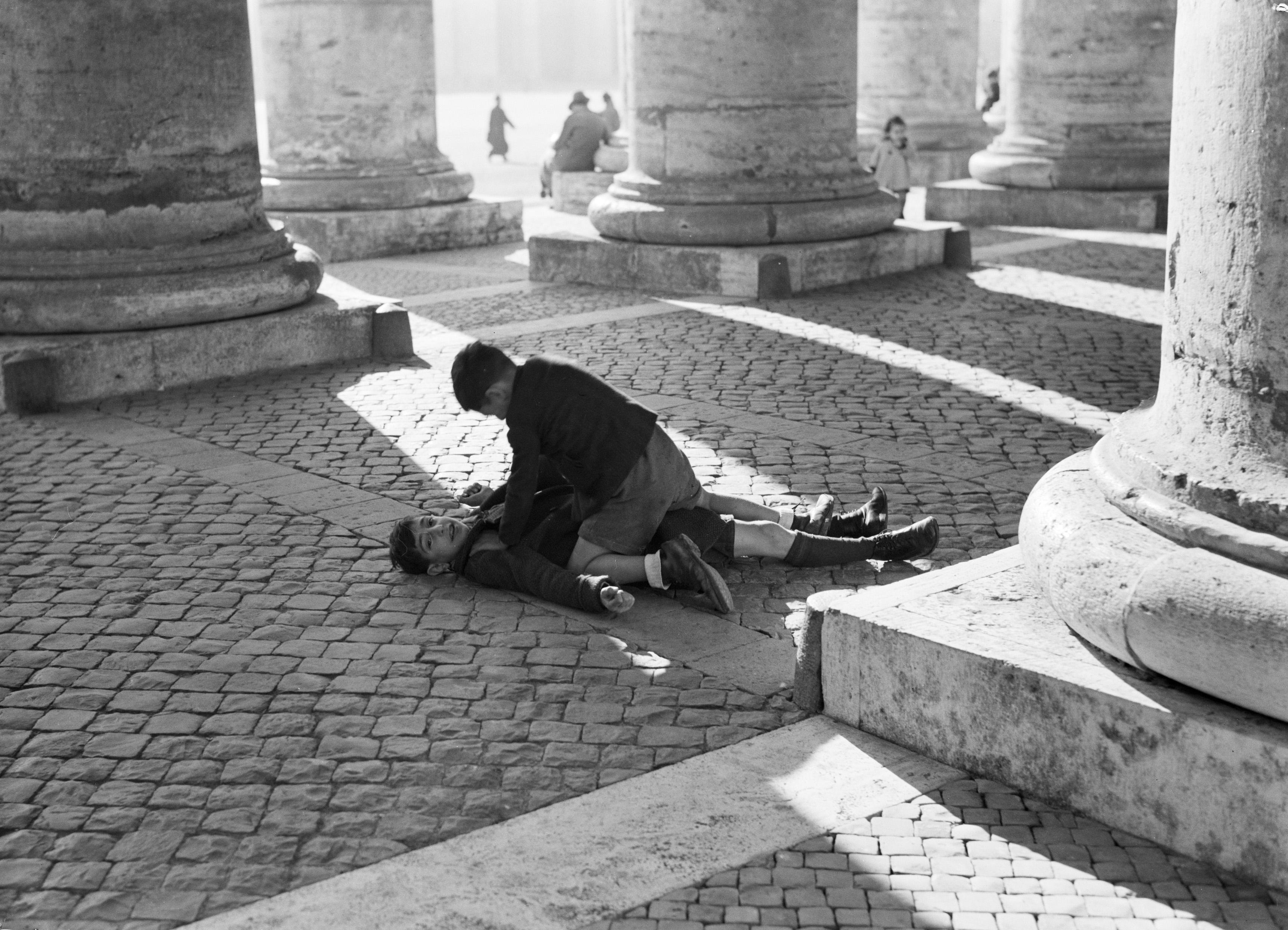
Boys playing among the columns of Piazza San Pietro, December 1937, Rome.

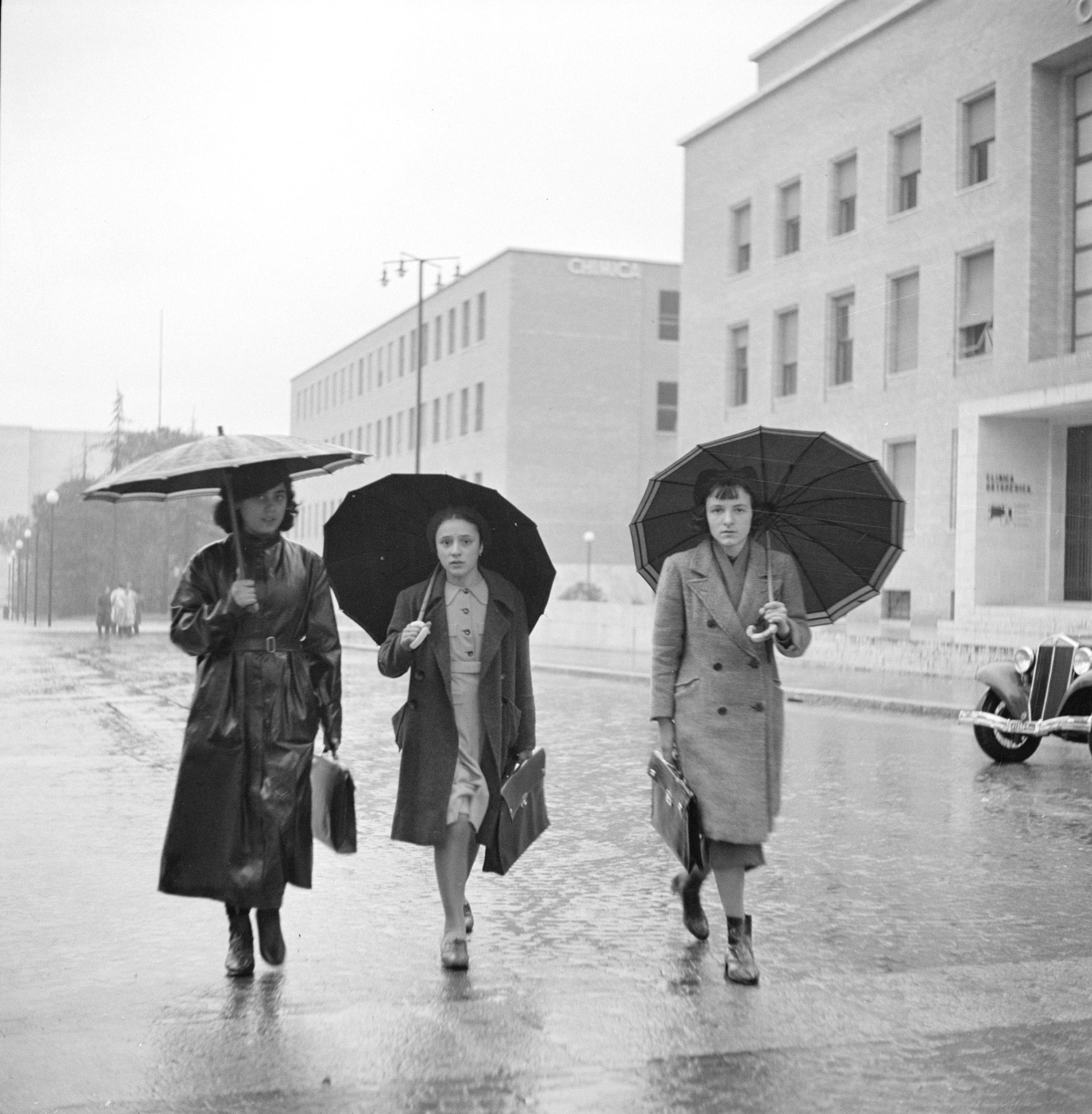
Three students at the Università La Sapienza, December 1937, Rome.

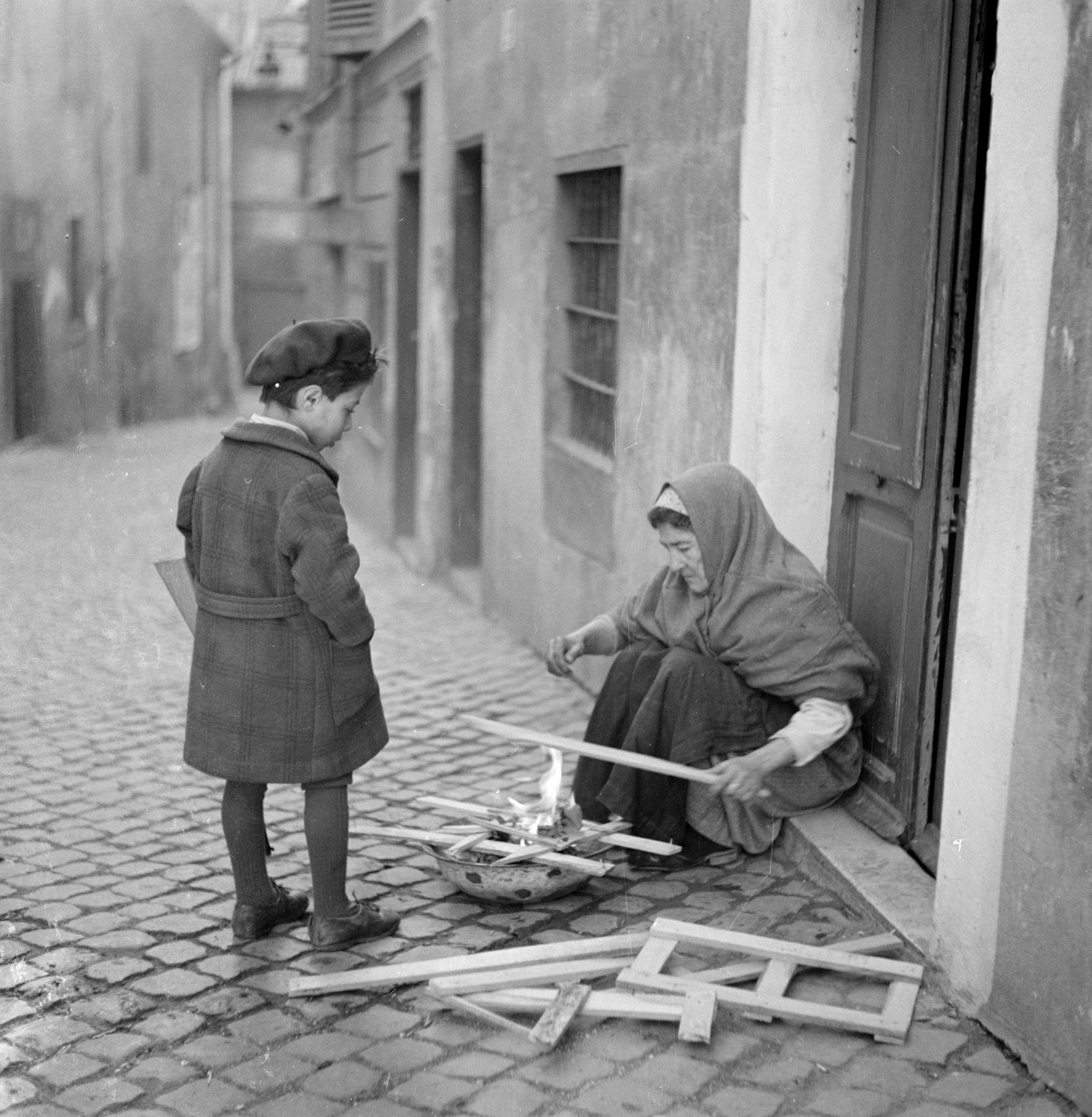
Poor people in a central zone, December 1937, Rome.

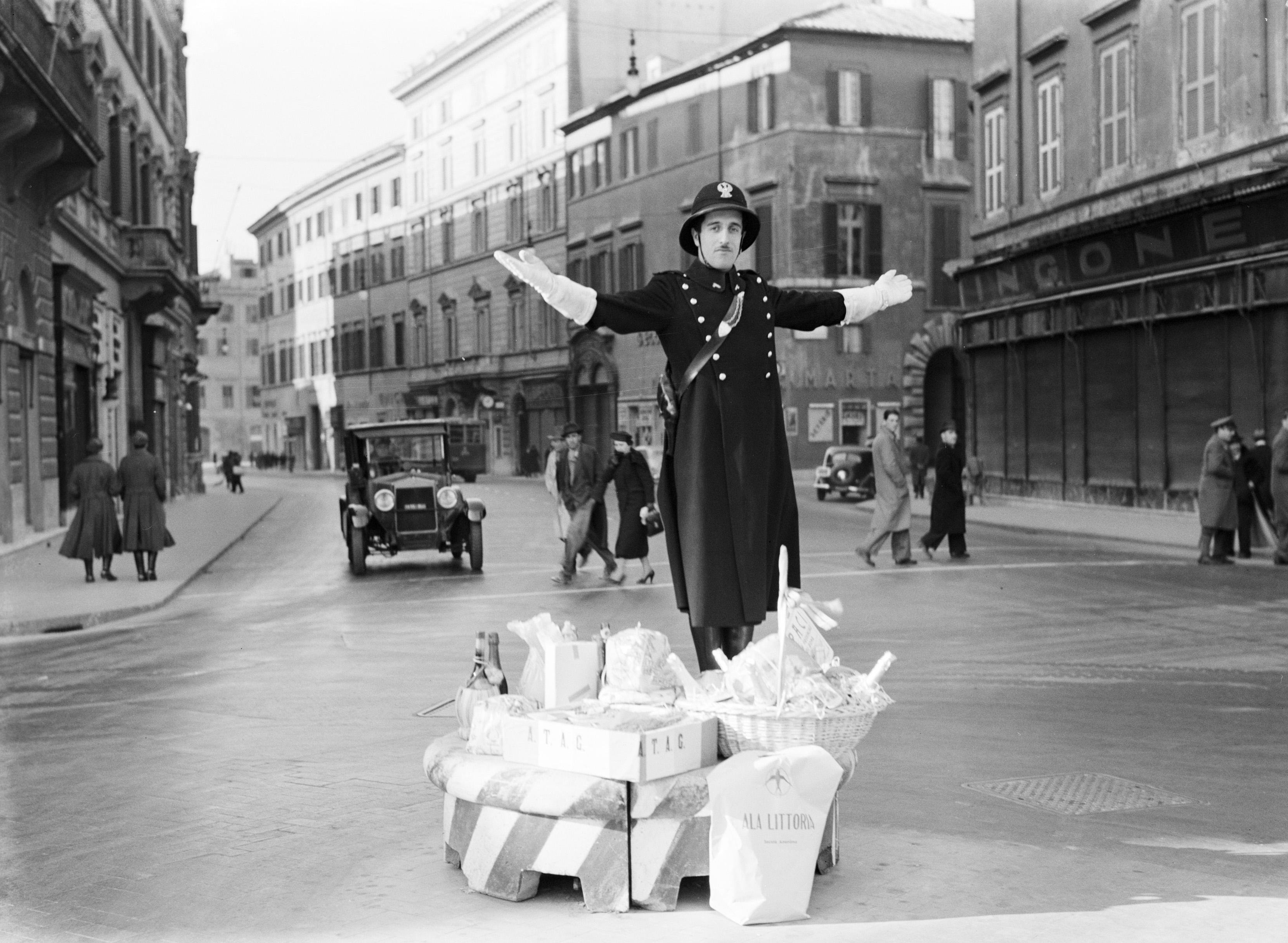
Befana for the traffic assistants (with many gifts), January 6, 1938, Rome.

== See also ==
- Anefo
- House of Orange-Nassau
