= Henk Jonker =

Dutch photographer

Hendrik Peter "Henk" Jonker (Berkhout, 23 November 1912 – Amsterdam, 24 September 2002) was a Dutch photographer. During World War II, he documented the impact of the German occupation of the Netherlands and after the war he started a press agency. Praised for portraying "ordinary people and small moments", his work appeared internationally in publications such as Time and Der Spiegel and was included in the 1955 exhibition The Family of Man; particularly notable are his photographs taken during the North Sea Flood of 1953.

== Biography ==
Born in Berkhout, a small town in West Friesland, Jonker moved to Amsterdam at the age of 13. During World War II, he had a job at the Amsterdam office for resident registration and got involved with the Dutch resistance. Photographer Marie Östreicher (better known as Maria Austria; the Maria Austria Institute in Amsterdam is named for her) taught him the techniques of photography, and he was able to forge personal identification documents for the resistance, until he had to go into hiding in 1944. Tall and blond, on occasion he dyed his hair black and, disguised as a female nurse, took photographs of Amsterdam documenting the German occupation. These photographs were used as documentary evidence of the occupation, and to strengthen morale and raise funds for resistance activities. During this period he used the aliases Gerrit Boersma, Frans Kreder, and Hélène Annie Smitshuisen.

Jonker married Austria after the war was over and for a while was a full-time photographer. With Austria and others he founded the press agency Particam (derived from Partizanen Camera) and documented the post-war reconstruction, as well as the devastation caused in Zeeland by the North Sea Flood of 1953, which killed over 1800 people in the Netherlands. Jonker arrived in Zeeland with the very first aid workers, and photographed people standing on the roofs of their homes. In 1955 his photograph of a joyfully dancing couple was selected by Edward Steichen for the exhibition and book The Family of Man. In 1959, he won second place in one of the World Press Photo of the Year categories.

From 1947 to 1950, he lived and worked in Ireland, and in 1963 he met Manja van Rootselaar with whom he later on married and had a daughter with in 1964, his only child, Manja. From 1965 to 1968, he worked and lived in Spain, making patatas fritas, returning to the Netherlands to work as a photographer during periods. In 1968 he returned to his country and settled in Bentveld and worked for the studios of Harry Pot and George van de Wijngaard. For a while he lived in Wormerveer and De Wormer and, from 1971 to 1978, he worked in Cruquius, for the Verenigde Nederlandse Uitgeverijen, overseeing set design. In 1982 he divorced and moved back to Amsterdam and, after 1986, specialized in art photography. He also worked for art institutions, such as the Holland Festival, and for companies, working on calendars, books, and annual reports. His work appeared in Der Spiegel and Time, and nationally in Margriet and Algemeen Handelsblad.

== Legacy ==
Jonkers was known for portraying ordinary people and street scenes, and his photographs of the reconstruction and the 1953 floods are cited as a lasting legacy. The 1998 exhibition Holland zonder haast ("Holland without haste") was dedicated to him.
