= Anefo =

Dutch photograph press agency

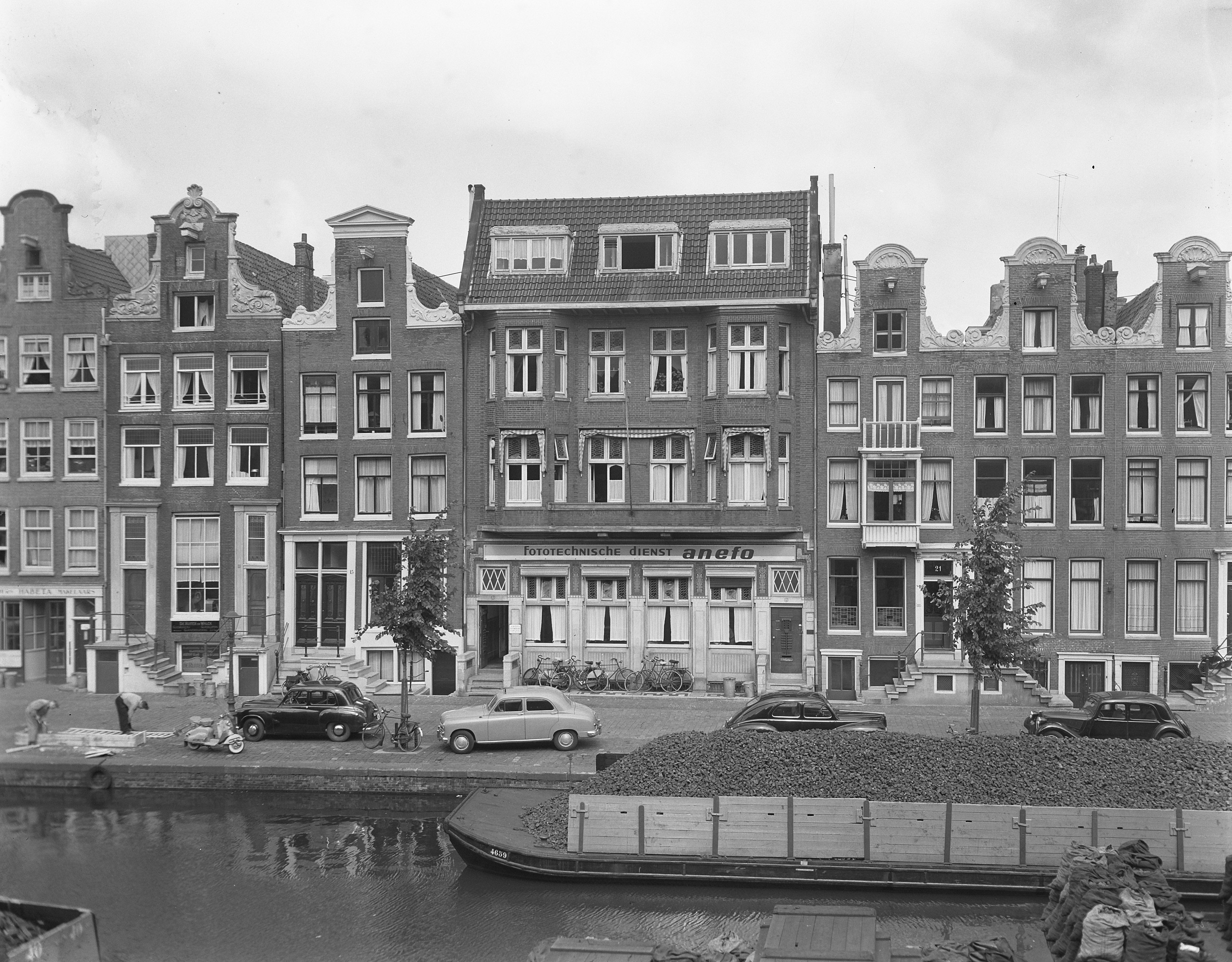
The Anefo Building, pictured in 1954.

The Algemeen Nederlandsch Fotobureau (General Dutch Photo Bureau, or ANeFo) was a photograph press agency in the Netherlands, that worked together with the Algemeen Nederlands Persbureau (ANP) and other press agencies, until it ceased to exist in 1989. It is not to be confused with ANP Photo, the photo department of the ANP.

== History ==
The Anefo agency was started in 1944 by the Bureau Militair Gezag (BMG), the provisional government during World War II. Although it started as a government agency, it was privatised soon after the war ended.

The purpose of the Anefo was to promote publicity for the government and to form a documentation archive for use by the Dutch Press. Another organization in London, the Regeerings Voorlichtingsdienst (RVD), was also doing similar work, and the two organizations were interrelated.

After Belgium was liberated in September 1944 the BMG was moved to Brussels along with the newly formed Anefo. Once the Northern Netherlands were liberated, the Anefo took up quarters in Amsterdam (though Brussels remained active until December 1945).

The Anefo Photo archives worked with the Nationaal Archief and Wikipedia in 2012 to place 140,000 images on Dutch news events from the period 1959-1989 under a CC-by-SA-license, in order to transfer them to Wikimedia Commons.

In 2015 approx. 15,000 of these photographs were uploaded to Wikimedia Commons. In 2018 the number in Commons was well over 260,000 photographs.

Well-known photographers working for Anefo were Emmy Andriesse, Charles Breijer, Ron Kroon, Fernando Pereira, Harry Pot and Willem van de Poll.

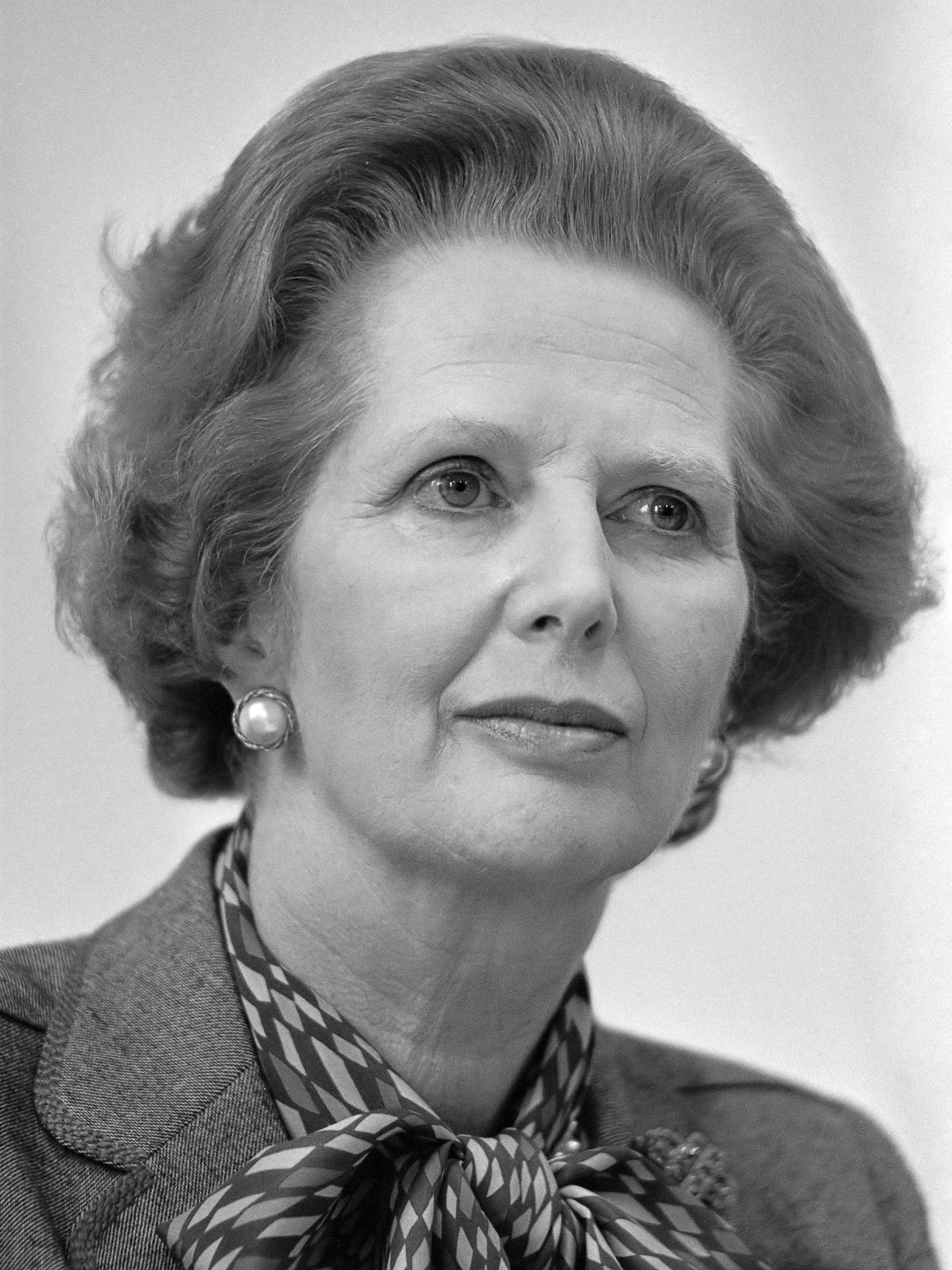
Margaret Thatcher (1983)
(Photo Rob Bogaerts -Anefo)

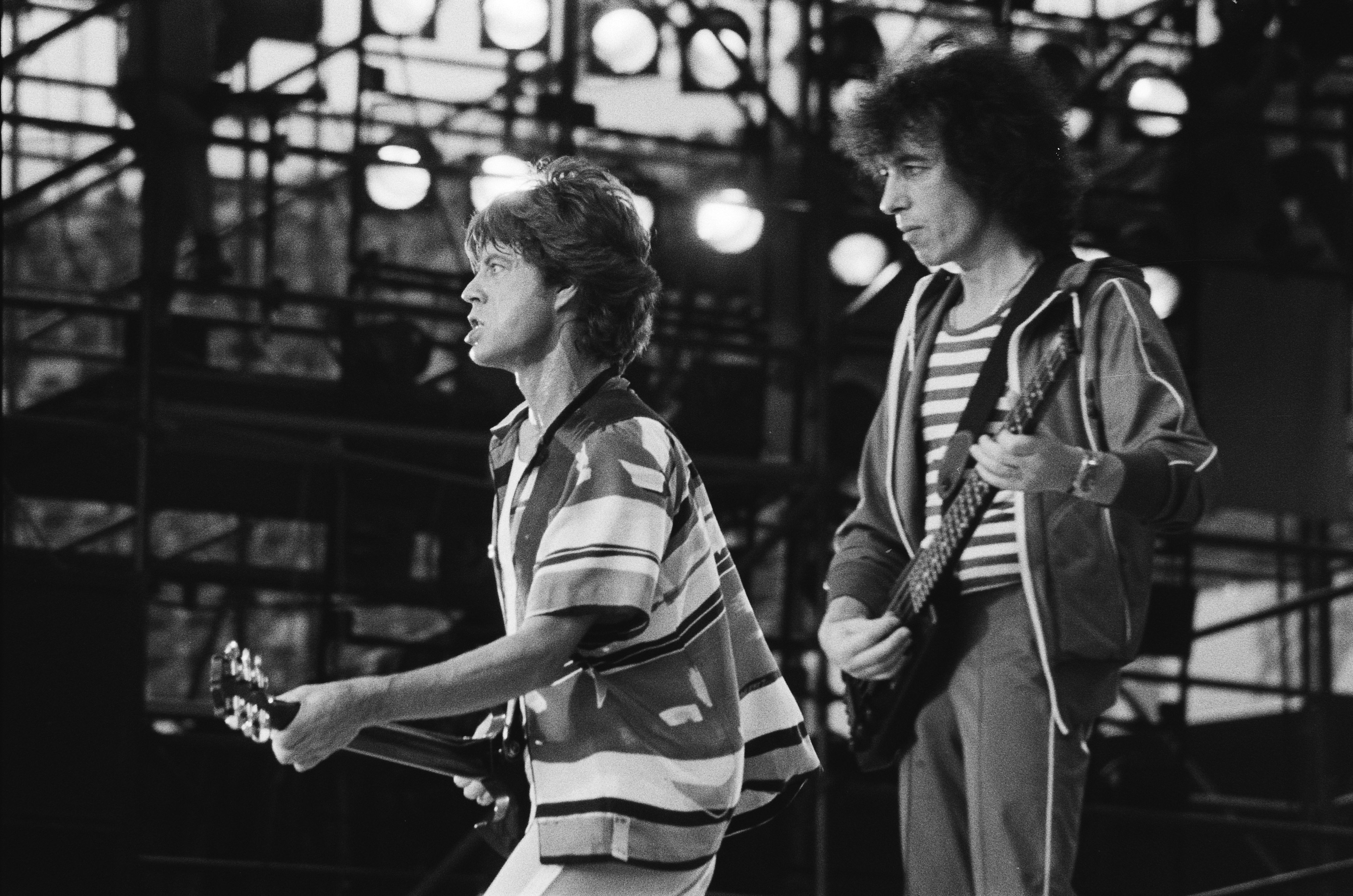
Rolling Stones (1982)
(Photo Marcel Antonisse -Anefo)

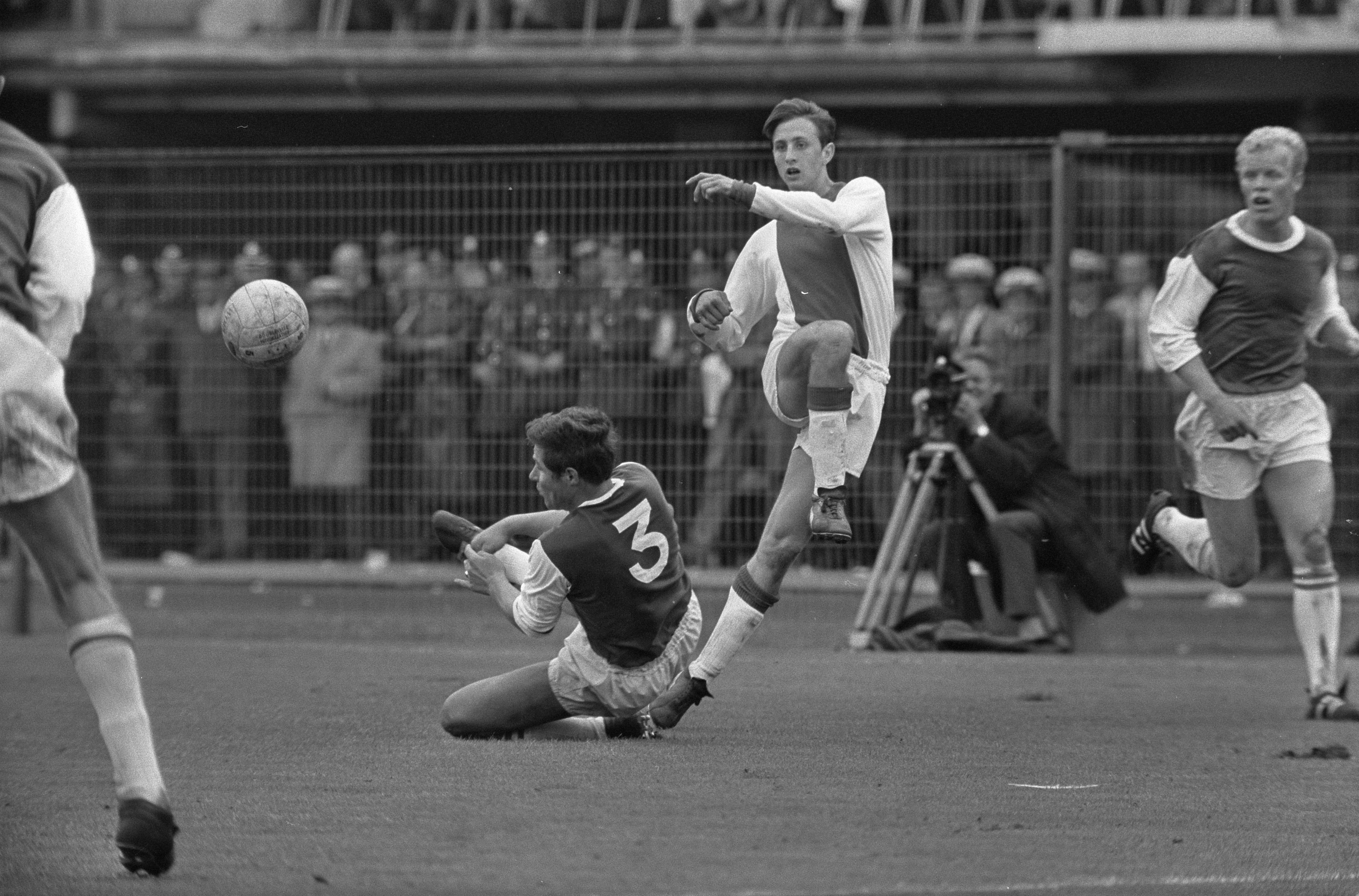
Johan Cruyff (1967)
(Photo Ron Kroon - Anefo)

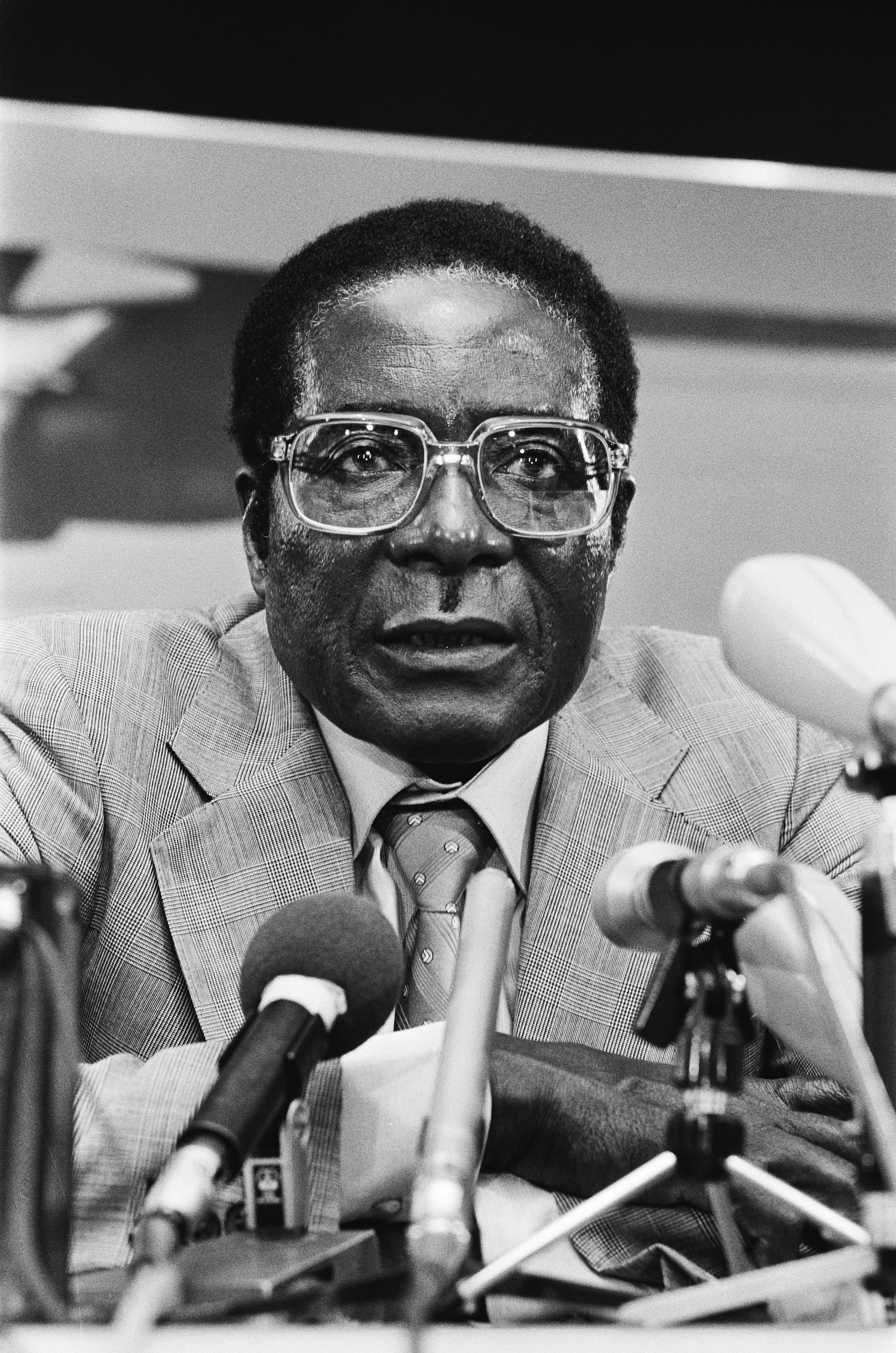
Robert Mugabe (1982) Photo: Marcel Antonisse - Anefo)

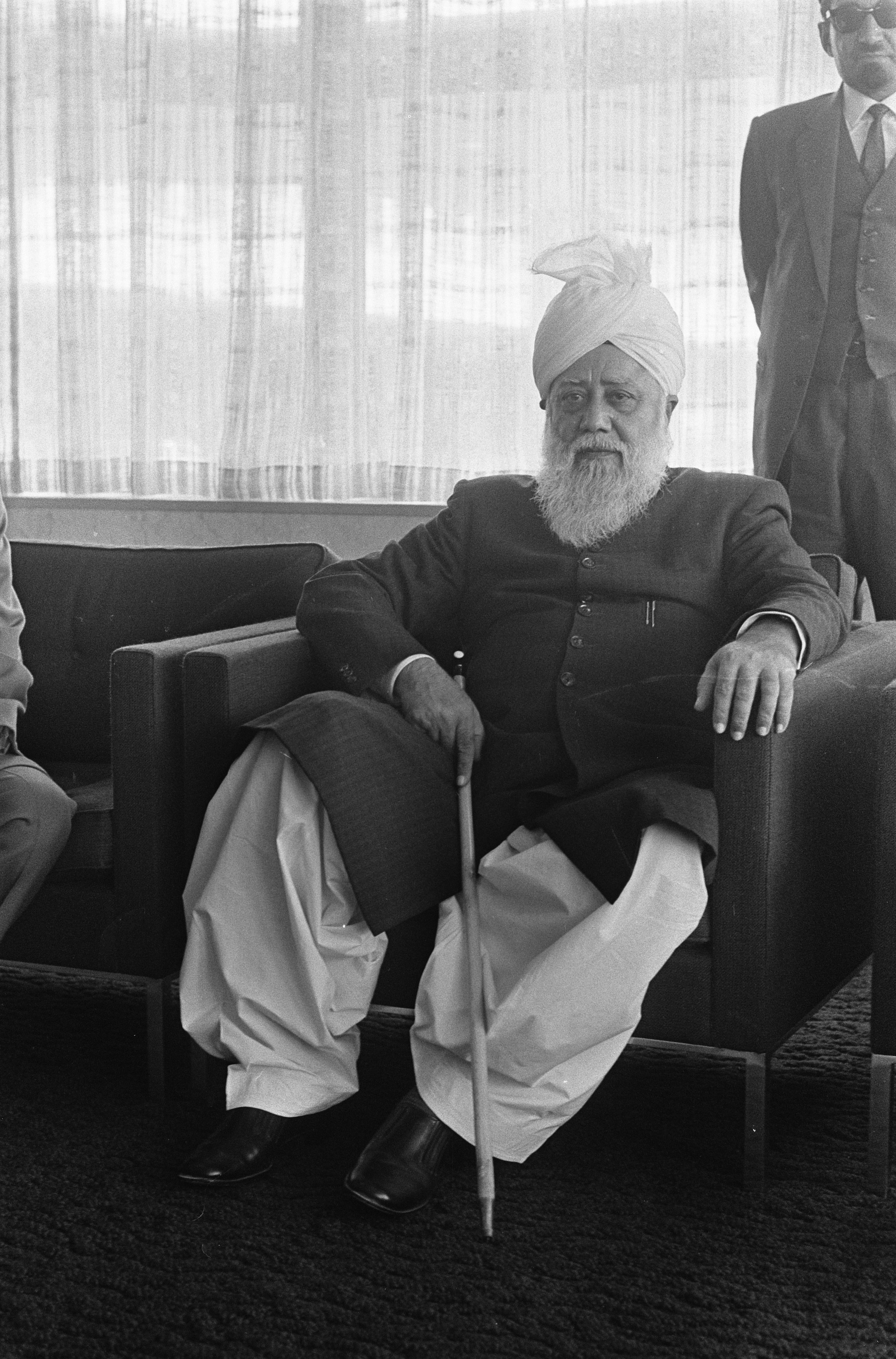
Mirza Nasir Ahmad (1967)
(Photo Ben Merk - Anefo)
