= Co Giling =

Dutch former speed skater (born 1950)

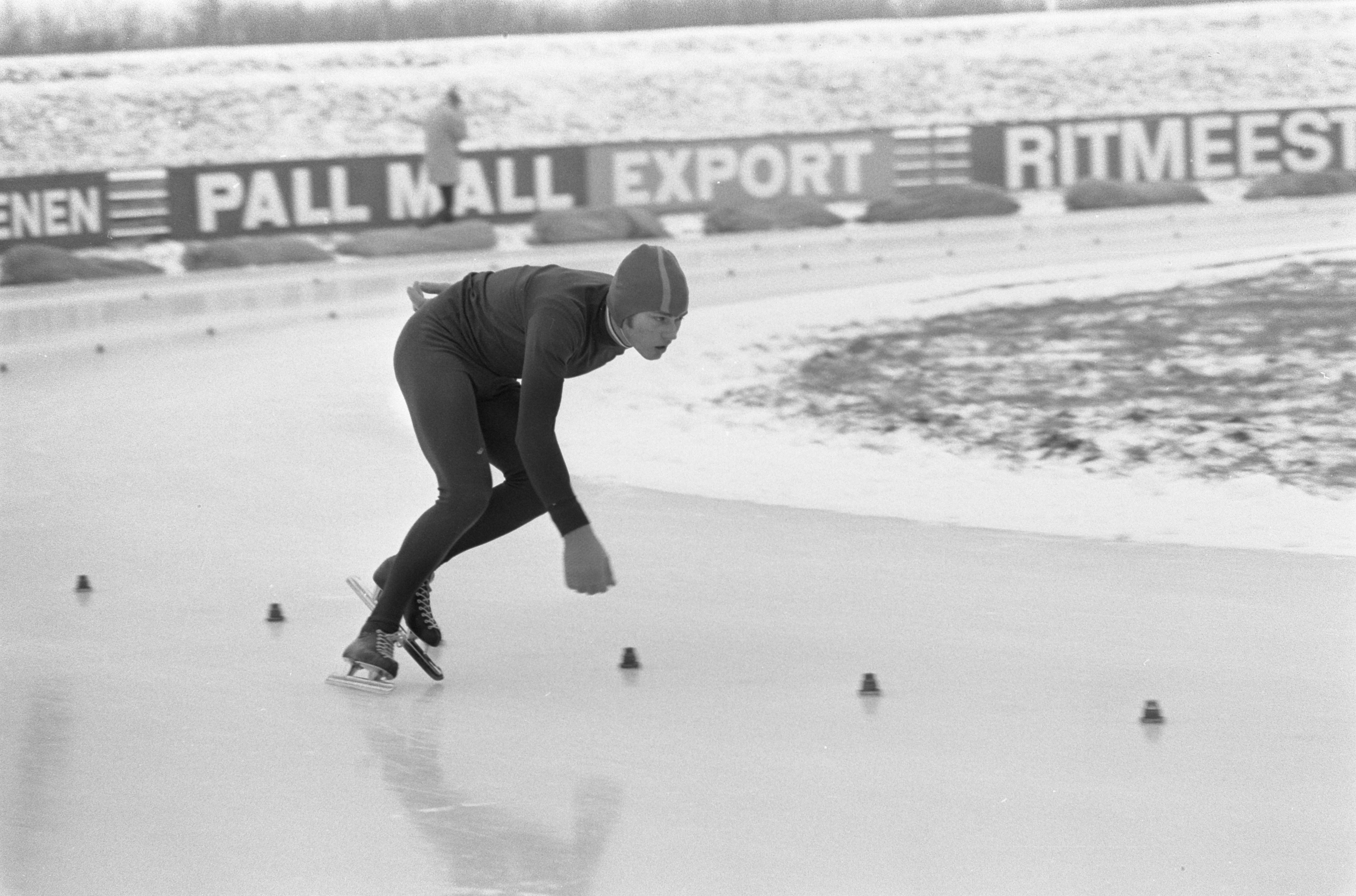
- Giling, winner of the National A-Junior Championships (1970).

Personal information
- Born: 21 April 1950 (age 76) Berkhout, North Holland, Netherlands
- Years active: 1970–1987

Sport
- Sport: Marathon speed skating
- Events: Long distances Marathons

Co Giling (born 21 April 1950) is a Dutch former long-track and marathon speed skater. As a marathon skater, he won the Royal Dutch Skating Federation (Koninklijke Nederlandsche Schaatsenrijders Bond; KNSB) Cup four times (in 1976, 1977, 1978, and 1980) and became the national champion on artificial ice three times (in 1977, 1980, and 1981). Furthermore, he won the Heineken Three-Day event in 1977 and the natural-ice classic Veluwemeertocht in 1980. He also won the Jaap Eden Trophy in 1976.

== Career ==
=== Early years ===
Giling, who hails from the North Holland hamlet of De Hulk, was a highly talented speed skater even as a teenager. He became the national champion in the B-junior category in both 1966 and 1967, remaining undefeated throughout those two years. The student at the secondary horticultural school in Hoorn moved up to the A-junior level in 1968, where, later that year, he set the junior records for the 3,000 metres and 5,000 metres.

In early 1969, following a fall during the 3,000-metre race, Giling struck his head against a barrier and had to be taken to hospital with a concussion. That brought his season to an end. In mid-1969, he moved up to the core squad alongside Jappie van Dijk.

=== No breakthrough ===
Giling made his debut at the Dutch All-round Championships in January 1970, finishing tenth. A week later, he won the national title in the A-junior category by winning three of the four distances. During his second National All-round Championship in January 1971, he finished sixteenth overall – partly owing to two falls during the 10,000-metre race. He failed to achieve a breakthrough that year and did not qualify for the 1972 National All-round Championship. Giling subsequently stopped speed skating and continued as an amateur cyclist.

=== Back on the ice ===
After a three-year absence, the 24-year-old Giling secured another victory as a speed skater in January 1975. He made his debut with a marathon win in the B-division in Eindhoven and was immediately promoted to the A-category. He felt at home in marathon skating and, in the following 1975/1976 season, won the KNSB Cup, which bore the sponsored name "Heineken Trophy." The following season began on 7 November 1976, with a victory in the opening classic, the Jaap Eden Trophy. He strung together a series of victories and became national marathon champion for the first time on 19 February 1977. A month later, he won the KNSB Cup for the second time in a row.

=== Period of success ===
In the late 1970s and early 1980s, Giling was virtually unbeatable on the marathon circuit. He won the KNSB Cup four times; following victories in 1976 and 1977, he also triumphed in 1978 and 1980. In 1979 and 1981, Giling had to settle for second place behind Arie Eriks, another former member of the long-track national squad. Giling won the Dutch national title on artificial ice three times: in 1977, 1980, and 1981. This achievement made him a joint record-holder for the most Dutch titles, alongside Jan Maarten Heideman, Lammert Huitema, Jan Kooiman, and Bert Jan van der Veen.

In February 1978, Giling received the "Abe de Vries Trophy" for the best skater of the season, presented during the Dutch National Marathon Skating Championships on artificial ice.

=== National All-round Championships again ===
After eight years, Giling returned to the Dutch All-round Championships in January 1979. He was disqualified in the third event – the 1,500 metres – after three false starts. During the final months of 1979, at the age of 29, he improved four of his personal bests. At the 1980 Dutch All-round Championships, he finished eleventh overall, with his best results being seventh-place finishes in both the 5,000 and 10,000 metres. Giling competed in this championship partly with an eye on the 1980 Winter Olympics in Lake Placid; as a marathon skater, he hoped to qualify for the long-distance events. His quest, however, was not fulfilled; the competition was too strong. The starting spots for the 5 and 10 kilometres went to Hilbert van der Duim, Piet Kleine, and Yep Kramer.

At the end of the 1986/1987 season, Giling announced his retirement at the age of 36. The Alternative Elfstedentocht on 7 March 1987, in Kuopio, Finland – where he finished eighteenth – was his last race. He subsequently became team manager of the Kwantum marathon squad.

Co Giling is Dutch former professional cyclist Bas Giling's father.

== Personal bests ==
Distance	Time	Date	Track
500 m	42.30	6 December 1976	(Netherlands) Utrecht
1000 m	1:26.1	20 November 1977	(Netherlands) Alkmaar
1500 m	2:06.08	17 November 1979	(Netherlands) IJsselstadion
3000 m	4:16.38	10 December 1979	(Netherlands) Utrecht
5000 m	7:26.9	18 November 1979	(Netherlands) Utrecht
10 000 m	15:32.3	20 November 1979	(Netherlands) Utrecht

== Long-track speed skating results ==
1966
(gold) NK juniors–B
1967
(gold) NK juniors–B
1970
(gold) NK juniors–A

Year	NK all-round
1970	10th (19th, 9th, 11th, 7th)
1971	16th (24th, 11th, 20th, 16th)
1979	DQ (17th, 15th, DQ3, –)
1980	11th (15th, 7th, 15th, 7th)

(#, #, #, #) = distance ranking at an all-round tournament (500 m, 5000 m, 1500 m, 10 000 m).
DQ3 = disqualified in the third race.

== Marathon speed skating results ==
=== Results in major competitions ===
Year	NK artificial ice	NK natural ice	Jaap Eden Trophy	KNSB Cup standing	Heineken Driedaagse	Heineken Zesdaagse	Alternative Elfstedentocht	Elfstedentocht
1975	3rd place, bronze medalist(s)							
1976	6th		1st place, gold medalist(s)	1st place, gold medalist(s)			4th	
1977	1st place, gold medalist(s)		3rd place, bronze medalist(s)	1st place, gold medalist(s)	1st place, gold medalist(s)			
1978	3rd place, bronze medalist(s)		7th	1st place, gold medalist(s)				
1979	5th		2nd place, silver medalist(s)	2nd place, silver medalist(s)				
1980	1st place, gold medalist(s)		2nd place, silver medalist(s)	1st place, gold medalist(s)				
1981	1st place, gold medalist(s)		5th	2nd place, silver medalist(s)				
1982	withdrew		5th	3rd place, bronze medalist(s)				
1983	4th		5th	5th		5th		
1984	6th		4th	5th			12th	
1985		11th	3rd place, bronze medalist(s)	10th				32nd
1986			18th					20th
1987	14th	23rd					18th	

=== Results in natural-ice classics ===
Year	Amstelmeer Marathon	Rottemeren- tocht	Veluwemeer- tocht	USA Marathon
1979	2nd place, silver medalist(s)			
1980			1st place, gold medalist(s)	
1982		2nd place, silver medalist(s)		
1985			3rd place, bronze medalist(s)	
1986				10th
1987	10th			

=== Medal table ===
Championship	Gold (gold)	Silver (silver)	Bronze (bronze)
NK artificial ice	3	0	2
KNSB Cup standing	4	2	1
Natuurijsklassiekers	1	2	1
Meerdaagse	1	0	0
Races on artificial ice	35	29	31

Sources:

- Profile of Co Gilling at Schaatspeloton.nl
- Profile of Co Gilling at Speedskatingbase.eu
