= Berkhout =

- Village
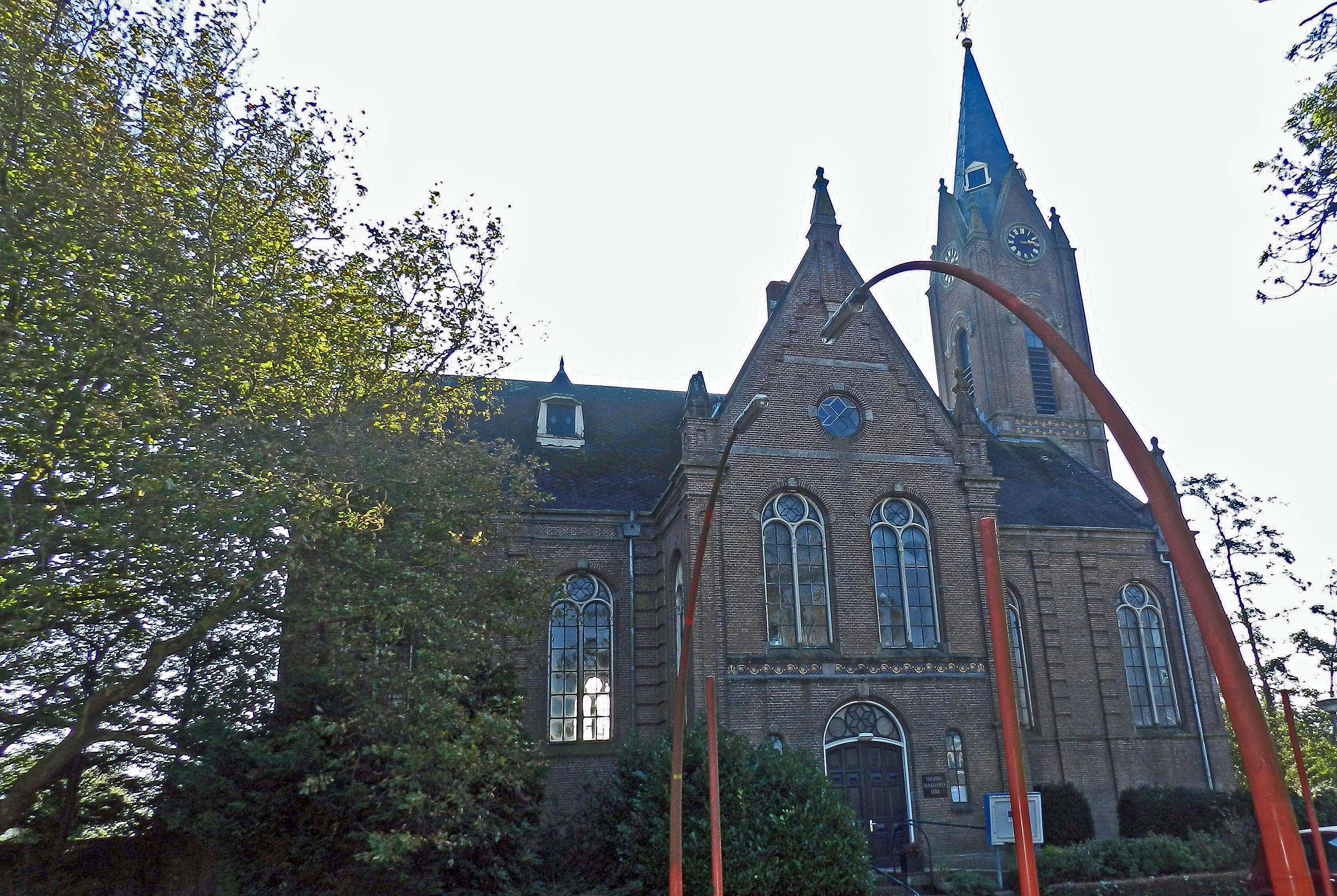
- Dutch Reformed church

- Location in the Netherlands Location in the province of North Holland in the Netherlands
- Coordinates: 52°38′31″N 4°59′49″E
- Country: Netherlands
- Province: North Holland
- Municipality: Koggenland

Area
  - Village: 18.33 km^{2} (7.08 sq mi)
- Elevation: −2.3 m (−7.5 ft)

Population (2025)
  - Village: 2,335
  - Density: 127.4/km^{2} (329.9/sq mi)
  - Urban: 2,060
  - Rural: 275
- Time zone: UTC+1 (CET)
  - Summer (DST): UTC+2 (CEST)
- Postal code: 1647
- Dialing code: 0229

Berkhout is a village in the northwest Netherlands. It is in the municipality of Koggenland, North Holland, about 5 km (3 mi) west of Hoorn.

== History ==
The village was first mentioned around 1312 as Berchout, and means "deciduous forest of birch (Betula) trees". Berkhout developed in the 13th century as a peat excavation village.

The Dutch Reformed church is a T-shaped church in Renaissance Revival style built in 1884. The titittower(= was added in 1886.

Berkhout was home to 766 people in 1840. It was an independent municipality until 1979 when it was merged into Wester-Koggenland. In 2007, it became part of the municipality of Koggenland.

== Notable people ==
- Co Giling, speed skater (born 1950)
- Henk Jonker, photographer (1912–2002)

== Gallery ==
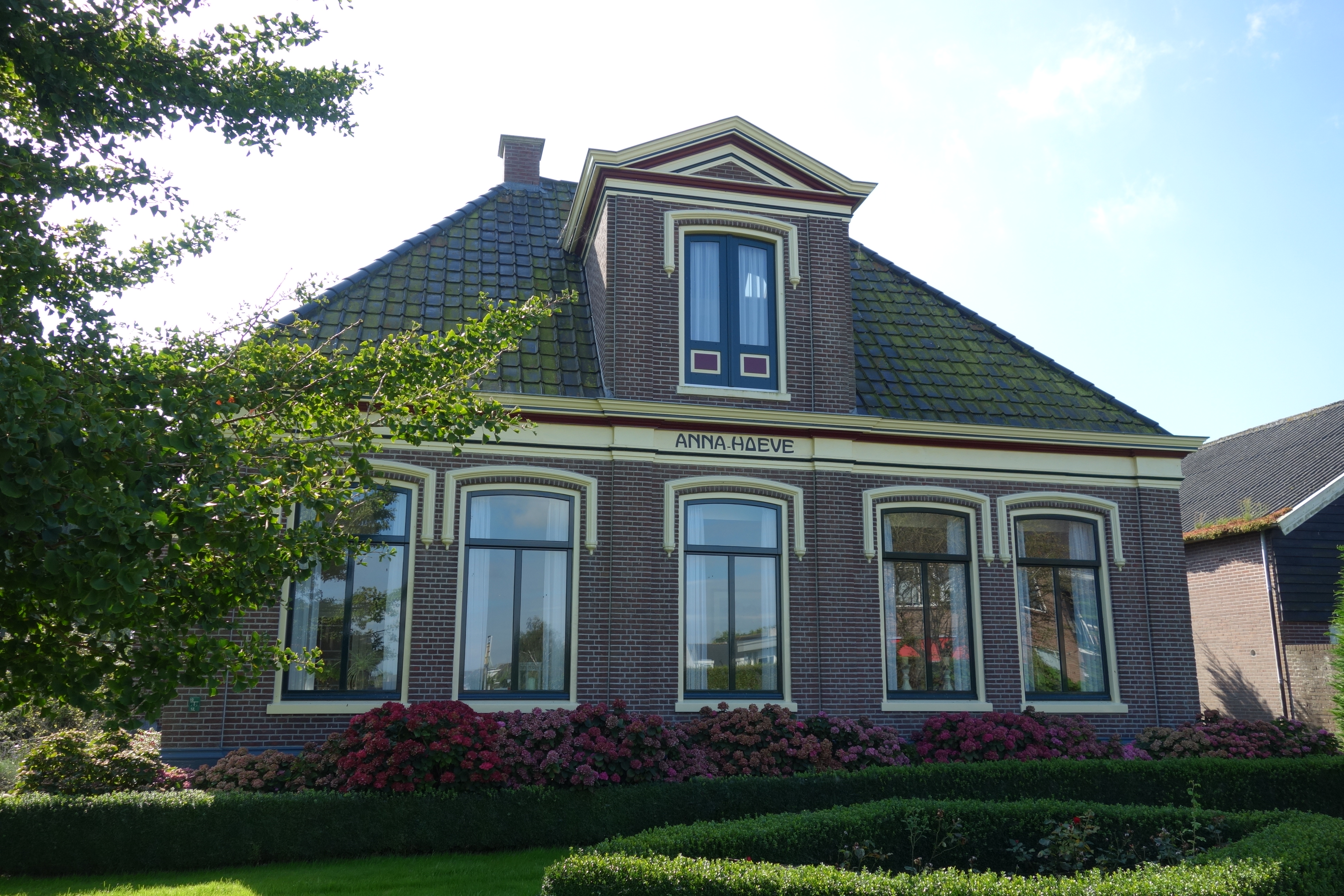
Farm Anna Hoeve

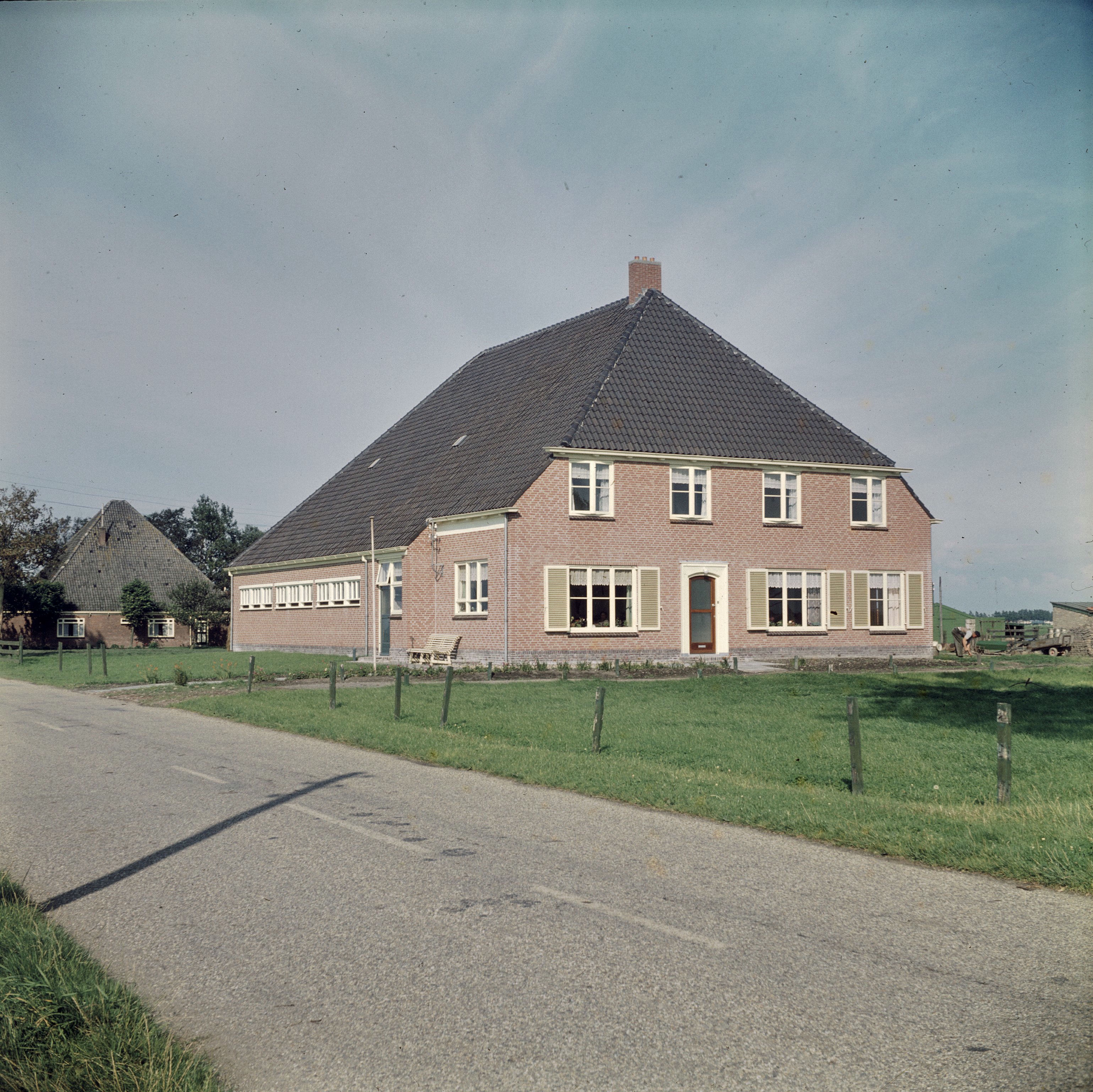
Farm in Berkhout

== Climate ==
Climate data for Berkhout (1991−2020 normals, extremes 1999−present)
Month	Jan	Feb	Mar	Apr	May	Jun	Jul	Aug	Sep	Oct	Nov	Dec	Year
Record high °C (°F)	13.6 (56.5)	18.0 (64.4)	22.3 (72.1)	27.1 (80.8)	29.8 (85.6)	32.5 (90.5)	35.7 (96.3)	33.0 (91.4)	29.7 (85.5)	25.0 (77.0)	19.1 (66.4)	14.4 (57.9)	35.7 (96.3)
Mean daily maximum °C (°F)	5.9 (42.6)	6.5 (43.7)	9.5 (49.1)	13.7 (56.7)	17.3 (63.1)	19.7 (67.5)	22.0 (71.6)	21.9 (71.4)	18.8 (65.8)	14.4 (57.9)	9.7 (49.5)	6.7 (44.1)	13.8 (56.8)
Daily mean °C (°F)	3.6 (38.5)	3.7 (38.7)	6.0 (42.8)	9.1 (48.4)	12.8 (55.0)	15.4 (59.7)	17.7 (63.9)	17.6 (63.7)	14.7 (58.5)	11.0 (51.8)	7.2 (45.0)	4.4 (39.9)	10.3 (50.5)
Mean daily minimum °C (°F)	1.1 (34.0)	0.9 (33.6)	2.4 (36.3)	4.5 (40.1)	8.0 (46.4)	10.8 (51.4)	13.1 (55.6)	13.0 (55.4)	10.6 (51.1)	7.6 (45.7)	4.4 (39.9)	1.8 (35.2)	6.5 (43.7)
Record low °C (°F)	−15.4 (4.3)	−21.9 (−7.4)	−18.7 (−1.7)	−6.5 (20.3)	−1.7 (28.9)	3.5 (38.3)	6.7 (44.1)	6.3 (43.3)	2.9 (37.2)	−4.4 (24.1)	−6.7 (19.9)	−10.0 (14.0)	−21.9 (−7.4)
Average precipitation mm (inches)	73.3 (2.89)	61.1 (2.41)	51.8 (2.04)	41.3 (1.63)	52.3 (2.06)	58.3 (2.30)	73.5 (2.89)	98.1 (3.86)	84.8 (3.34)	98.6 (3.88)	84.6 (3.33)	86.5 (3.41)	864.2 (34.02)
Average precipitation days (≥ 1.0 mm)	13.1	11.2	9.7	8.4	9.1	9.3	10.2	11.9	11.2	12.8	14.0	14.6	135.5
Average relative humidity (%)	88.3	86.6	83.3	79.7	78.2	79.6	79.6	81.4	84.6	86.5	89.5	89.6	83.9
Mean monthly sunshine hours	69.4	95.3	153.1	209.9	236.6	218.8	233.6	205.5	155.5	120.7	68.0	59.1	1,825.5
Percentage possible sunshine	27.1	33.9	41.5	49.5	48.5	43.5	46.2	45.0	40.8	36.5	25.7	24.7	38.6
Source: Royal Netherlands Meteorological Institute
