= Stephan Vanfleteren =

Belgian photographer

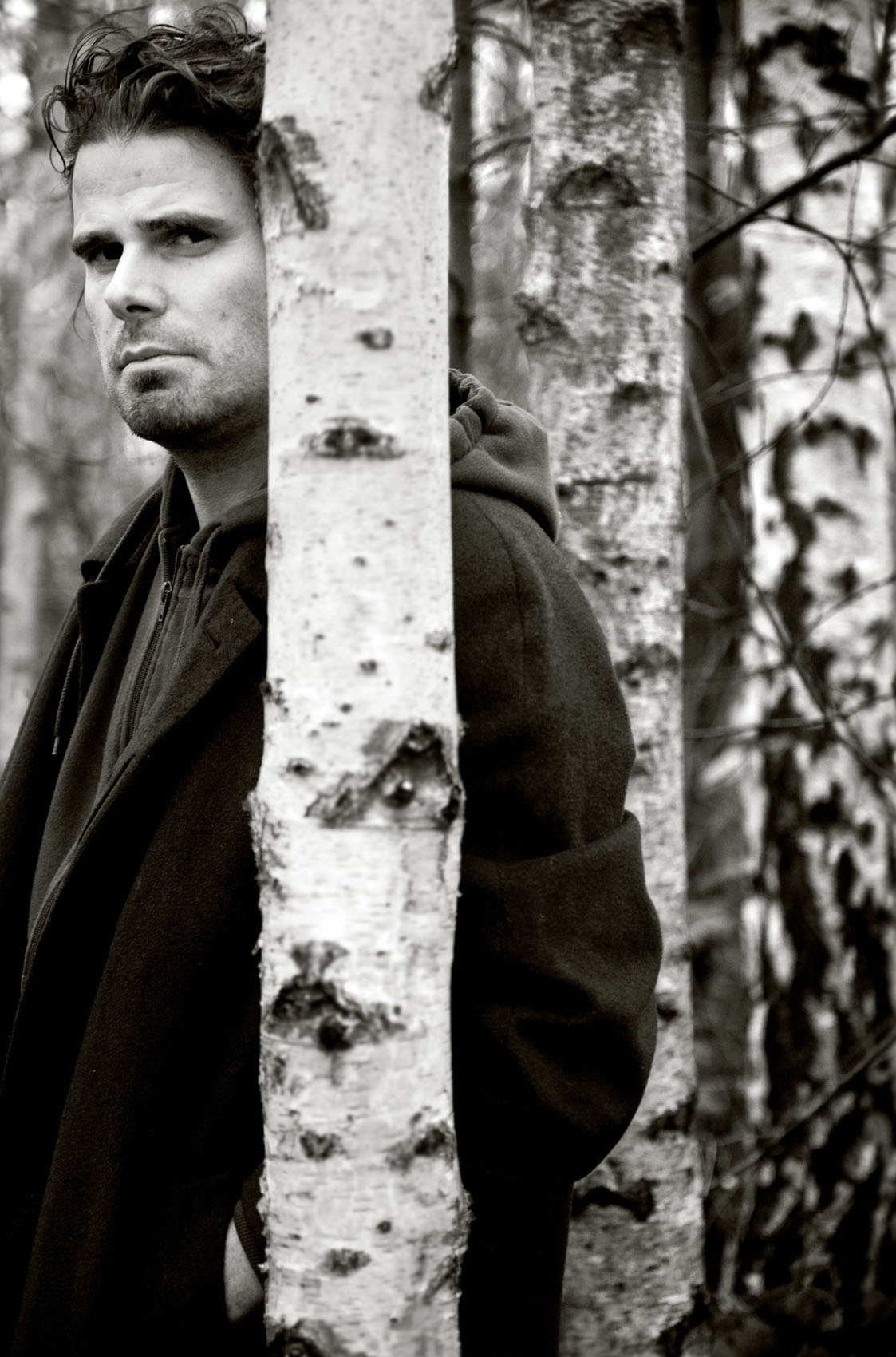

Stephan Vanfleteren (born 1969) is a Belgian photographer, best known for his portraits in black and white and his depictions of Belgium and abroad.

== Biography ==
Stephan Vanfleteren was born in Kortrijk in 1969, and was brought up in Oostduinkerke. He studied photography at the Institut Saint-Luc in Brussels from 1988 to 1992.

In 1993, while awaiting military service, he made a trip to New York, where he mostly did street photography. He has described New York as his "entrance ticket" to the profession of photography.

== Career ==
Vanfleteren started out as primarily a photojournalist for the newspaper De Morgen. In this role, he covered, in black and white, stories of the 1990s such as the death of King Baudouin, the protests over the Clabecq ironworks, the Kosovo War, the Rwandan genocide, and the Dutroux affair. He also found time for stories far from the headlines, such as the experience of riding boxcars in the American northwest.

He has also contributed to The Guardian, Humo, Independent Magazine, Knack, Le Monde, Paris Match, de Volkskrant, and Die Zeit.

Co-founder of the publishing company Uitgeverij Kannibaal/Hannibal, he is also its artistic director. Since 2010, he has been a visiting professor at the Royal Academy of Fine Arts in Ghent.

=== Elvis&Presley ===
In May 1999, Vanfleteren travelled around the USA with his friend the Swiss photographer Robert Huber, in the footsteps of their idol Elvis Presley. They photographed each other, "in identical white jumpsuits, mirror shades and high-rise hair", as "Elvis" (Huber) and "Presley" (Vanfleteren), in humdrum scenes from Times Square to Death Valley. Vanfleteren photographed in black and white, Huber in colour. This led to Vanfleteren's first major book and an exhibition. Both photographers, said a reviewer of the exhibition at the Open Eye Gallery, showed themselves to "have a fine eye for ironic composition".

=== From reportage to portraiture ===
Vanfleteren's portraits have been his best-known and most recognizable work. Always in black and white, he has photographed many people from the art world but also many who are unknown. A review in Het Nieuwsblad of an exhibition of his portraits commented that Vanfleteren's proximity to the faces and the detail of the photographs together almost create "death masks of the living". (Note: dodenmaskers van levenden)

As an international project, Vanfleteren has given faces to numerous people living in poverty and isolation in Antwerp and Brussels. "While I focused on their eyes, I listened to their experiences." In 2009 these portraits, along with others, became the subject of an exhibition at Le Botanique, a cultural centre in Brussels. Most were taken with one of Vanfleteren's four Rolleiflexes, as their waist-level finders allowed him to get close.

In the same year, at Wintercircus Mahy, Ghent, Vanfleteren exhibited Portret 1989–2009, around two hundred portraits in black and white of people who had had some media presence during the previous two decades. The exhibition then went on tour.

In 2018, he published Surf Tribe, for which he had made a months-long journey around the world, making portraits of surfers. He went to the most celebrated beaches for surfing, but also little-known places in order to portray the most famous surfers, champions as well as unknown amateurs. He did not photograph them in motion but instead captured their static portraits on the beach.

=== Belgicum ===
From September 2007 to February 2008, the exhibition Belgicum was held at Fotomuseum Antwerp (FoMu). A review in La Libre described this:

Dilapidated buildings, outdated town fairs, unfashionable bars [. . .]. Series of portraits – one could call them mugs – of persons bearing the scars of their hard lives, landscapes engulfed in mist, a document of the repetitive days of an internee at the Guislain Institute in Ghent and finally an un-embellished portrayal of Theofiel, an old farmer broken down amid a pile of objects. This is all "Belgicum"; and obviously, as the [book of the same title] also shows, this tragic Belgium of the little people between canals and side-roads is in fact that of a true Simenon of photography. (Note: Bâtisses délabrées, kermesses ringardes, bistrots borgnes, des ambiances qui se prolongent dans sept suites d'images installées en grand tout autour du reste de la salle. Séries de portraits – de gueules plus exactement – d'écorchés de la vie dure, paysages tous noyés dans la brume, constat des journées répétitives d'un interné de l'institut Guislain à Gand et enfin description au couteau de Theofiel, un vieux fermier cassé au milieu de son capharnaüm. C'est tout cela "Belgicum" et de toute évidence, comme le laisse voir également le très bel album éponyme, cette Belgique tragique des petites gens entre canal et trajectoires obliques est en fait celle d'un véritable Simenon de la photo.)

=== Charleroi ===
Vanfleteren was the fifth (after Bernard Plossu, Dave Anderson, Jens Olof Lasthein and Claire Chevrier) in a series of photographers to be provided with a residency at the Museum of Photography in Charleroi. He produced a series of photographs, including many portraits, taken in that city, which had been greatly affected by deindustrialization. These were exhibited in the museum in 2015. The exhibition was described on RTBF as "a tender look at a harsh reality", and as having links to the work of August Sander and Walker Evans yet being the product of a singular vision. (Note: Il livre un reportage à fleur de peau et pose un regard tendre sur une réalité âpre. [. . .] Le reportage humaniste de Stephan Vanfleteren a la force du style documentaire qui le relie à des auteurs tels August Sander et Walker Evans, mais le regard du photographe est singulier.) A review in Moustique said:

Alone, free as a dog, sidling between fog and neon lights, in streets where memories of once flourishing industry disintegrate, or contemplating from the top of a slag heap a landscape where factories once spewed smoke, it is above all the decay of the world that he encounters. (Note: Seul, libre comme un chien, se faufilant entre brouillard et néons, dans des rues où s’écroulent les souvenirs d’une industrie autrefois florissante, ou contemplant du haut d’un terril un paysage où les usines vomissaient autrefois des nuages de fumée, c’est surtout toute la décrépitude du monde qu’il croise.)

=== Façades & Vitrines ===
With rare exceptions, Vanfleteren has only photographed in black and white. However, in 2013 he published a series of colour photographs, taken several years earlier, of old wall advertisements, facades destined for demolition or abandoned shop windows; these appeared in a lavishly produced book, Façades & Vitrines.

=== Stil leven ===
In 2016, Vanfleteren made a series of photographs for an exhibition, Stil leven, at the Museum Oud Amelisweerd (MOA), in Bunnik. Rejecting the museum's initial request for photographs of the Atlantic Wall, he let himself be influenced by the environment of the museum and the surrounding park to realize a series of nudes, still lifes with dead animals, in both black and white and colour. His photos form a dialogue with the work of the painter Armando, the building, and the surrounding nature.

=== Present ===
In 2020, Fotomuseum Antwerp organized a major retrospective, Present, which followed Vanfleteren's thirty years of photography, with personal reflections: from street photography in cities such as New York to the Rwandan genocide, from store facades to the "darkly beautiful" remains of the Atlantic Wall, from still lifes to portraits.

== Awards ==
- World Press Photo awards
  - 1996 Photo Contest: Sports, Stories, 3rd prize
  - 1997 Photo Contest: Daily Life, Stories, 1st prize
  - 1997 Photo Contest: People in the News, Stories, 2nd prize
  - 2001 Photo Contest: Children's Award, Singles, Individual awards
  - 2001 Photo Contest: Arts and Entertainment, Stories, 3rd prize
  - 2013 Photo Contest: Staged Portraits, Stories, 1st prize
- European Fuji Award, 1998
- Louis Paul Boon Prize 2009
- Henri Nannen Prize 2011
- Nationale Portretprijs (Note: Also named "Rabo Photographic Portrait Prize".) (Netherlands) 2012; for a portrait of Rem Koolhaas
- Culture Prize of the Province of West Flanders 2013
- Honorary doctorate at the Vrije Universiteit Brussel in August 2021, together with the photographer Dirk Braeckman

== Exhibitions ==
=== Solo and pair exhibitions ===
- Elvis&Presley. Accompanied by a book.
  - Centro internazionale di fotografia Scavi Scaligeri, Verona, 2001.
  - Open Eye Gallery, Liverpool, December 2001 – January 2002.
  - Photographie am Schiffsbauerdamm (FAS), Berlin, 2002.
- Belgicum. Accompanied by a book.
  - FotoMuseum Provincie Antwerpen. September 2007 – January 2008.
  - Flanders Center, Osaka. February–March 2008.
  - Le Botanique (Centre Culturel de la Fédération Wallonie-Bruxelles), Brussels. June–August 2009.
  - Galerie Hilaneh von Kories, Hamburg. November 2011 – March 2012.
  - ImageSingulières, Sète, France. May–June 2012.
  - Galerie Hilaneh von Kories, Hamburg. January–April 2015.
- Portret 1989–2009. Accompanied by a book.
  - Wintercircus Mahy, Ghent, September–December 2009.
  - Centre Céramique, Maastricht, April–June 2010. Accessed 5 August 2020.
  - C-Mine, Genk, Belgium, December 2010 – February 2011.
- Flandrien. (At some venues, with cycling-related poems by Hugo Claus, Herman Gorter, Gerrit Komrij, Tom Lanoye, Dimitri Verhulst and others, curated by Louis De Pelsmaeker.) Accompanied by a book.
  - Flandrien: Hard Men and Heroes. Host Gallery (Honduras Street Gallery), London. June–July 2007.
  - Flandrien. Vlaams Cultuurhuis de Brakke Grond, Amsterdam. April 2010.
  - WielerSportCultuur. Netherlands Photo Museum, Rotterdam. June–August 2010.
  - WielerSportCultuur. KU Leuven library. September–October 2010.
  - Flanders Center, Osaka. March 2013. (Note: Website (in Japanese) created for this exhibition.)
  - Flanders Center, Osaka. June 2013.
- Flakkelân. Fries Museum, Leeuwarden, Netherlands, June–August 2010.
- Photography #1. De Tijd Hervonden, Hasselt, Belgium, February–April 2011. Successively: portraits, from Belgicum, and from Elvis&Presley.
- En avant, marche, Huis van Alijn, Ghent, November 2012 – September 2013. Accompanied by a book.
- Façades & Vitrines. Accompanied by a book.
  - Broel Museum at Buda-fabriek, Kortrijk. March–June 2013. One of three shows constituting Aller Retour (the others being by Carl De Keyzer, from Moments before the Flood, and by Bieke Depoorter, from her series of people in their homes). (Note: "Stephan Vanfleteren – Façades & Vitrines"; eight-minute video, hosted by Vimeo: an interview of Vanfleteren by PhotoQ (in Dutch).) (Note: For a personal description of the exhibition, see Kelly Steenlandt, "Aller retour", kellysteenlandt.com, 12 April 2013.) (Note: Photographs of Façades & Vitrines – both the book and the show at the Broel Museum – are at "Façades & Vitrines", The Book Design Blog, 15 January 2014.)
  - Galerie Hilaneh von Kories, Hamburg. March–June 2014.
- Stil Leven: Stephan Vanfleteren & Armando, Museum Oud Amelisweerd (MOA), Bunnik, Netherlands, March–September 2016. An exhibition by Vanfleteren and Armando.
- MMXIV: Les Diables / De Duivels. About the "Red Devils", Belgium's soccer team. Accompanied by a book.
  - Botanique, Brussels. June–August 2014.
  - C-Mine, Genk, Belgium. June–August 2015.
- Atlantic Wall. Photographs of the (German, wartime) "Atlantic Wall". Atlantic Wall Museum, Raversyde, Belgium. June–October 2014. Accompanied by a book.
- Charleroi. Photographs of Charleroi. Musée de la photographie de Charleroi, Belgium. May–December 2015. Accompanied by a book.
- Engelen van de Zee = The angels of the sea. Portraits of pupils of the maritime school Koninklijk Werk IBIS, Bredene.
  - Navigo (Nationaal Visserijmuseum), Oostduinkerke, Belgium, July–November 2016.
  - Het Scheepvaartmuseum, Amsterdam, September 2020 – April 2021. (Previously scheduled June–August 2020.)
- Photographs of the Utrechtsch Studenten Corps (USC) and the student society PHRM. Utrecht University, May–July 2016. Accompanied by a book.
- The People of Mercy. Maritiem Park, Antwerp, October–November 2017.
- Surf Tribe. Accompanied by a book.
  - Scharpoord, Knokke-Heist, Belgium. March–May 2018. Accompanied by a book.
  - Kunsthal, Rotterdam, Netherlands. October 2018 – January 2019.
  - Kahmann Gallery, Amsterdam, Netherlands. January–March 2019.
  - Liberté! Bordeaux 2019, L'esprit des Lumières, Cour Mably and Musée d'Aquitaine, Bordeaux, France. July–September 2019.
- Terre / Mer. Gemeentemuseum Den Haag, The Hague, July–November 2018. Photographs of Walcheren, commissioned by the Gemeentemuseum Den Haag and presented as a supplement to an exhibition of paintings of Walcheren by Jan Toorop, Piet Mondriaan, Jacoba van Heemskerck and Ferdinand Hart Nibbrig.
- Onuitgesproken: Michel Van Dousselaere. Museum Dr. Guislain, Ghent. December 2019 – March 2020. Accompanied by a book.
- Present. FoMu Antwerp. October 2019 – September 2020. (Note: "Virtuele rondleiding", FoMu. A series of short videos (hosted by Vimeo) showing the exhibition. "Present at home | Compilation – all episodes | A virtual tour through the FoMU exhibition of Stephan Vanfleteren," Vimeo. Twelve-minute video, with Dutch narration and English subtitles.) Accompanied by a book.
- Corona walks. FoMu Antwerp. June–September 2020. Accompanied by a book.

=== Group exhibitions ===
- Buren, document Nederland, drie buitenlandse fotografen kijken naar Nederland. Rijksmuseum Amsterdam. November 2000 – February 2001. With Eva Leitolf and Mark Power. Accompanied by a book.
- In de marge: Belgische documentaire fotografie = In the Margin: Belgian Documentary Photography = En marge: Photographie documentaire belge. Museum Dr. Guislain, Ghent, Belgium, June–September 2011. Accompanied by a book.
- Call the world brother. Aberystwyth Arts Centre, May–July 2012. Panos Pictures exhibition, with work by GMB Akash, Chloe Dewe Mathews, Robin Hammond, Chris Keulen, Andrew McConnell, Espen Rasmussen, Martin Roemers, and Vanfleteren.
- Modern Times: Photography in the 20th Century, Rijksmuseum Amsterdam. November 2014 – January 2015. Curated by Mattie Boom and Hans Rooseboom.
- Facing Japan. With Marleen Daniëls, Nick Hannes, Michiel Hendryckx, Jimmy Kets, Maroesjka Lavigne, Tony Le Duc, Charlotte Lybeer, Sarah Van Marcke and Rob Walbers. Museum Dr. Guislain. June–September 2015. Accompanied by a book.
- Faces Now: European Portrait Photography since 1990 = Faces Now: Portraits photographiques européens depuis 1990. By 33 photographers. (Note: Including two pairs of photographers: Clegg & Guttmann, and Ari Versluis & Ellie Uyttenbroek; therefore billed as "31 photographes réputés".) Accompanied by a book.
  - Bozar, Brussels. February–May 2015.
  - Netherlands Photo Museum, Rotterdam. June–August 2015.
  - Thessaloniki Museum of Photography, September 2015 – February 2016.

== Collections ==
- MOU – Museum Oudenaarde and the Flemish Ardennes
- Rijksmuseum Amsterdam. 102 works (as of 15 August 2021).

== Books ==
=== By Vanfleteren alone ===
- Flandrien. A compact photobook showing cyclists and cycling. (Note: On the title Flandrien: In Flanders the term flandrien refers to cyclists who display a strong work ethic, great perseverance, are powerful and who perform best in adverse weather conditions. Until the 1960s, only leading cyclists originating from the province of West- and East-Flanders were considered as flandriens. After 1960, the media extended the use of this term to Belgian cyclists in general and even to international cyclists. — Stef Van Puyenbroeck, et al., "Can Cancellara really be a Flandrien? Ethno-cultural identity representation predicts regional exclusivity of a historically contested cycling term", Psychologica Belgica, 58 (1), 19 March 2018. doi:10.5334/pb.358.) Accompanied by an exhibition.
  - Ghent: Merz, 2005. ISBN 978-90-7697-902-1.
  - Ghent: Medium, 2006. ISBN 978-90-7697-922-9.
  - [S.l.]: Kannibaal, 2010. ISBN 978-90-8162-371-1. (Note: Publisher's description of Flandrien, as retrieved by the Wayback Machine on 8 September 2013.)
- Belgicum. With an essay, "B", by David Van Reybrouck in Dutch, French, and English. (Note: Belgicum is the nominative, accusative and vocative case form of Latin singular belgicus, meaning "Belgic".) Accompanied by an exhibition.
  - Tielt: Lannoo, 2007. ISBN 978-90-209-7121-7.
  - [Lichtervelde]: Hannibal, 2016. ISBN 978-94-9208-183-4. (Note: Publisher's description of Belgicum, as retrieved by the Wayback Machine on 6 November 2019.)
- Oosteroever: Editie #1. Ostend: TarTarT, 2007. ISBN 9081211617.
- Portret, 1989–2009. Tielt: Lannoo, 2009. ISBN 9789020984835. Accompanied by an exhibition.
- The Last Post. [Lichtervelde]: Hannibal, 2013. ISBN 9789491376306. Thirty-two postcards and a book.
- Façades & vitrines. [Lichtervelde]: Hannibal, 2013. Text in Dutch and French. ISBN 978-94-9137-644-3. (Note: Publisher's description of Façades & vitrines, as retrieved by the Wayback Machine on 14 April 2013.) Accompanied by an exhibition.
- MMXIV – Les Diables / De Rode Duivels. [Lichtervelde]: Cannibal, 2014. ISBN 978-9491376689. Photographs of the Belgium national football team. Accompanied by an exhibition.
- Atlantic Wall. [Veurne]: Hannibal, 2015. Accompanied by an exhibition.
  - Text in Dutch and English. ISBN 978-94-9137-679-5. (Note: Publisher's description of Atlantic Wall (Dutch/English), as retrieved by the Wayback Machine on 9 August 2018.)
  - Text in French and English. ISBN 978-94-9208-184-1. (Note: Publisher's description of Atlantic Wall (French/English), as retrieved by the Wayback Machine on 12 August 2018.)
- Charleroi: Il est clair que le gris est noir. [Veurne]: Hannibal, 2015. Text in Dutch and French. ISBN 978-94-9208-141-4. (Note: Publisher's description of Charleroi, as retrieved by the Wayback Machine on 9 November 2018.) Accompanied by an exhibition.
- Surf Tribe. [Veurne]: Hannibal, 2019. (Note: Surftribe.be, website for the book.) Accompanied by an exhibition.
  - Dutch-language edition. ISBN 978-94-9267-735-8.
  - English-language edition. ISBN 978-94-9267-736-5. (Note: Publisher's description of Surf Tribe, as retrieved by the Wayback Machine on 9 November 2018.)
- Present. [Veurne]: Hannibal, 2019. (Note: Publisher's description of Present (English- and Dutch-language editions).) Accompanied by an exhibition.
  - Dutch-language edition. ISBN 978-94-6388-714-4.
  - English-language edition. ISBN 978-94-6388-715-1.
- Dagboek van een Fotograaf: Coronawandelingen. Amsterdam: De Bezige Bij, 2020. ISBN 9789403199207. (Note: Publisher's description of Dagboek van een Fotograaf.) Accompanied by an exhibition.

=== In collaboration ===
- Giganten van Afrika: De hoge vlucht van Nigeria's Super Eagles. By Jan Antonissen, Vincent Loozen, and Vanfleteren. Leuven: Van Halewyck, 1998. ISBN 9056171577.
- Buren, document Nederland, drie buitenlandse fotografen kijken naar Nederland = Neighbours: The Netherlands as seen by three foreign photographers. Amsterdam: De Verbeelding, 2000. ISBN 90-74159-30-3. With Eva Leitolf and Mark Power; text by Tracy Metz. Accompanied by an exhibition.
- Hans Vandekerckhove: schilderijen ter vervolmaking van methoden van onbeweeglijkheid. Otegem: Deweer Art Gallery, 2001. Accompanying an exhibition, March–April 2001. (Note: The exhibition: "Hans Vandekerckhove: schilderijen ter vervolmaking van methoden van onbeweeglijkheid".) Photographs of Hans Vandekerckhove by Vanfleteren and Peter Claeys. OCLC 901161533.
- Elvis&Presley. With Robert Huber. Accompanied by an exhibition.
  - Hamburg: Kruse, 2000. ISBN 3934923062.
  - Veurne: Cannibal, 2016. ISBN 978-94-9208-155-1. (Note: Publisher's description of Elvis&Presley.)
- Tales from a Globalizing world. Edited by Daniel Schwartz; with Philip Jones Griffiths, Zijah Gafić, Akinbode Akinbiyi, Shehzad Noorani, Tim Hetherington, Bertien van Manen, Andreas Seibert, Thomas Kern, Cristina Nuñez. London: Thames & Hudson, 2003. ISBN 0-500-28432-6.
- Koers! Het rijke Vlaamse wielerleven in twaalf portretten. Text by Jeroen de Preter and Tony Landuyt; photographs by Vanfleteren. Amsterdam: Meulenhoff; Antwerp: Manteau, 2003. ISBN 9789059900059.
- Verfraaiing: 12 werken uit de provinciale kunstcollectie, 12 creaties, 24 kunstenaarsportretten. Edited by Wendy Leplae and Chris Minten; photographs by Vanfleteren. Bruges: Provincie West-Vlaanderen, 2005. OCLC 901117845.
- Kinderen van de weg. Text by Betty Mellaerts, photographs by Vanfleteren. Hasselt, Amsterdam: Clavis, 2006. ISBN 9789044805246.
- Het beste moet nog komen. Text by Friedl' Lesage; photographs by Vanfleteren. Leuven: Van Halewyck, 2006. ISBN 9789056177300.
- Observatorium. Johan Tahon; with contributions by Paul DePondt, Wim Van Mulders, Peter Verhelst; photography by Mirjam Devriendt and Vanfleteren. Ghent: Ludion, 2008. ISBN 9789055447534.
- "Tot ziens!" Vanfleteren contributes photographs to this book and DVD set. Leuven: Davidsfonds/Infodok, 2008. ISBN 9789059082748.
- Schrijvers gaan niet dood. Text by Margot Vanderstraeten, photographs by Vanfleteren. Amsterdam: Atlas, 2008. ISBN 9789045006659.
- De dingen der helaasheid: over de verfilming van 'De helaasheid der dingen' van Dimitri Verhulst. By Dimitri Verhulst and Felix van Groeningen; photographs by Vanfleteren. Tielt: Lannoo, 2009. ISBN 9789020987805.
- WielerSportCultuur. Text by Frans Babylon and others; photographs by Vanfleteren. [S.l.]: Vlaams Ministerie van Sport, [2009]. OCLC 495778638.
- Merckxissimo. Concept by Jan Maes, text by Karl Vannieuwkerke and others, photographs by Vanfleteren and others. [Lichtervelde]: Kannibaal, [2009]. ISBN 9789081389402. About the cyclist Eddy Merckx.
- Karl Vannieuwkerke. Renner willen worden. Lichtervelde: Kannibaal 2010. ISBN 9789081389419. A memoir by the sports reporter Karl Vannieuwkerke. Vanfleteren contributes photographs.
- Karl Dhont, Stefaan Lammens, and Vanfleteren. Stam N° 3: leven voor blauw-zwart. Lichtervelde: Kannibaal, 2011. ISBN 9789081623773. About the fans of Club Brugge. Vanfleteren contributes photographs.
- Rik Vanwalleghem and Anna Luyten. De erfenis van Briek. Lichtervelde: Kannibaal, 2011. ISBN 978-9081623735. About the cyclist Briek Schotte. Vanfleteren contributes photographs.
- Aller/Retour: De grenzen van Fort Europa. With Michael de Cock. Ghent: Ludion, 2010. ISBN 9789085421719.
- Futur Simple: De kinderen van Congo. With Koen Vidal. Ghent: Ludion, 2010. ISBN 978-9085422105.
- Bobbejaan. By Tom Schoepen, with photography by Bobbejaan Records, Herman Selleslags and Vanfleteren. [Lichtervelde]: Kannibaal, 2011. ISBN 978-90-8162-376-6. About the musician Bobbejaan Schoepen. (Note: Publisher's description of Bobbejaan, as retrieved by the Wayback Machine on 23 September 2020.)
- De Ronde: Een Zondag in April. Photographs by Vanfleteren. [Lichtervelde]: Hannibal, 2011. ISBN 978-90-8162-374-2. About the television series De Ronde.
- In de marge: Belgische documentaire fotografie = In the Margin: Belgian Documentary Photography = En marge: photographie documentaire belge. Ghent: Museum Dr. Guislain; Tielt: Lannoo, 2011. ISBN 978-90-209-9627-2. With numerous other photographers. Includes Vanfleteren's series of photographs of a man named Étienne, who was caring for doves at Dr Guislain Psychiatric Centre (Ghent). Accompanied by an exhibition.
- Frederic Backelandt, Wilfried de Jong, and Vanfleteren. Fausto Coppi. Lichtervelde: Kannibaal, 2012. ISBN 978-9491376207. About the cyclist Fausto Coppi.
- Merckx 525. By Frederik Backelandt, Ron Reuman, Jan Maes, and Vanfleteren. Boulder, CO: Velo Press, 2012. ISBN 9781934030899. About Eddy Merckx.
- Sergiology. By Sergio Herman, Tony Le Duc, and Vanfleteren. Antwerp: Minestrone Culinaire Uitgeverij, 2012. ISBN 9789490028374. (Note: Sergiology.com, website for the book.)
- En avant, marche! Over majorettes, harmonies, fanfares en andere blaasorkesten. By Jan Matthys, Hanne Delodder, Marijke Libert; with photographs by Vanfleteren. [Lichtervelde]: Hannibal, 2012. ISBN 9789491376245. Accompanied by an exhibition.
- The Great War 1914–18: In Flanders Fields Museum photographic collection. Veurne: Hannibal, 2013. Text in Dutch, French and English. ISBN 9789491376566. Photographs from the In Flanders Fields Museum, edited under the supervision of Piet Chielens and Vanfleteren.
- Helden op het water. By Leo van de Ruit and Vanfleteren. [Veurne]: Hannibal, 2014. ISBN 9789491376764.
- Facing Japan. [Veurne]: Hannibal, 2015. ISBN 978-94-9208-144-5. In Dutch. Accompanied by an exhibition.
- Book of portrait photography. Accompanied by an exhibition.
  - Frits Giertsberg, ed. Portraits photographiques européens depuis 1990. [Veurnes]: Hannibal, 2015. ISBN 978-94-9208-131-5.
  - Frits Giertsberg, ed. European Portrait Photography since 1990. Munich: Prestel, 2015. ISBN 9783791349275.
- The Butcher's Book. [Veurne]: Hannibal, 2015. ISBN 978-94-9208-152-0. Text (in Dutch) by Hendrik Dierendonck, René Sépul and Marijke Libert; photography by Thomas Sweertvaegher and Vanfleteren. (Note: Publisher's description of The Butcher's Book, as retrieved by the Wayback Machine on 25 March 2016.)
- Placet Hic Requiescere Musis, 1816–2016. [Veurne]: Hannibal, 2016. ISBN 978-94-9208-159-9. Text (in Dutch) by Michiel Hegener, photography by Vanfleteren. Published for the 200th anniversary of the Placet hic Requiescere Musis. (Note: Publisher's description of Placet Hic Requiescere Musis.) Accompanied by an exhibition.
- Onuitgesproken: Michel van Dousselaere. Texts by Elvis Peeters, Erik-Ward Geerlings, Irma Wijsman and Vanfleteren. [Veurne]: Hannibal, 2020. ISBN 978-94-6388-734-2. About the actor Michel van Dousselaere. (Note: Publisher's description of Onuitgesproken.) Accompanied by an exhibition.

=== About Vanfleteren ===
- Stephan Vanfleteren. Text by Eric Min, edited by Bart Holsters. Grote Fotografen. Amsterdam: De Volkskrant. 2011. OCLC 759106407. (Note: Other issues in the series are devoted to Rineke Dijkstra, Carl De Keyzer, Raymond Rutting, Rob Hornstra, Koos Breukel, Hans Heus, Joost van den Broek, Robert Capa, Guus Dubbelman, Hellen van Meene, Sebastião Salgado, Gerard Fieret, Ed van der Elsken, Helmut Newton, Robert Doisneau, Henri Cartier-Bresson, Peter Lindbergh, Man Ray, Anton Corbijn.)
