= Hossein Fatemi (disambiguation) =

Hossein Fatemi was an Iranian scholar, journalist and politician.

Hossein Fatemi may also refer to:

- Hossein Fatemi (photographer) (born 1980), Iranian photographer
- Hossein Fatemi (psychiatrist), American-Iranian psychiatrist and professor of psychiatry at the University of Minnesota
