= Panos Pictures =

British photo agency

- Industry: Photography
- Founded: 1986
- Founder: Panos London
- Headquarters: London
- Key people: Adrian Evans
- Products: Photojournalism
- Website: www.panos.co.uk

Panos Pictures is a photo agency based in London and founded in 1986. It specialises in stories about global social issues for international media and NGOs using photography and video. It also produces exhibitions and long-term documentary projects. As of September 2015, Adrian Evans is its director and has a controlling share in the company.

== Details ==
Panos Pictures began in 1986 as a small independent for-profit photo agency specialising in environmental issues. It was founded and partly owned by environmental charity Panos London (the Panos Institute's London office) out of its photo archive. Adrian Evans joined as director in 1990 and spent five years overseeing its expansion.

Panos London closed in 2013. The Panos Institute, a sister organisation of Panos Pictures, has been renamed Panos Network, a network of five member institutes.

Panos Pictures has at any time a group of twenty of its photographers, called Panos Profile, whom it represents more comprehensively than its wider group of photographers, which it calls Panos Network (this Panos Network should not be confused with the sister organisation described above).

== Photographers who have been affiliated with Panos ==
- Aytunc Akad (Istanbul, Turkey)
- GMB Akash (Dhaka, Bangladesh)
- Kael Alford (Dallas, USA)
- Christian Als (Copenhagen, Denmark)
- Alfredo D'Amato (Palermo, Italy)
- Samuel Aranda (Girona, Spain)
- Jan Banning (Utrecht, Netherlands)
- Piers Benatar (Nairobi, Kenya)
- Chris de Bode (Amsterdam, Netherlands)
- Stefan Boness (Berlin, Germany)
- Heidi Bradner (London, UK)
- Patrick Brown (Bangkok, Thailand)
- Petrut Calinescu (Bucharest, Romania)
- Alfredo Caliz (Madrid, Spain)
- Zackary Canepari (San Francisco, USA)
- Jocelyn Carlin (Auckland, New Zealand)
- Xavier Cervera (Barcelona, Spain)
- Dean Chapman (Newcastle, UK)
- Elena Chernyshova (Moscow, Russia)
- Francesco Cito (Milan, Italy)
- Matias Costa (Madrid, Spain)
- Frederic Courbet (Nairobi, Kenya)
- William Daniels (Paris, France)
- Sanjit Das (Delhi, India)
- Adam Dean (Beijing, China)
- Tim Dirven (Brussels, Belgium)
- Kieran Dodds (Glasgow, UK)
- Nic Dunlop (Bangkok, Thailand)
- Andrew Esiebo (Lagos, Nigeria)
- Julio Etchart (Singapore)
- Hossein Fatemi (Chicago, USA)
- Steve Forres (London, UK)
- Stuart Freedman (Delhi, India)
- Shiho Fukada (New York, USA)
- Karla Gachet (Quito, Ecuador)
- George Georgiou (London, UK)
- Georg Gerster (Zurich, Switzerland)
- Andrea Gjestvang (Berlin, Germany)
- Tanya Habjouqa (East Jerusalem, Palestinian Territories)
- Robin Hammond (Paris, France)
- Noriko Hayashi (Tokyo, Japan)
- Mark Henley (Geneva, Switzerland)
- Adam Hinton (London, UK)
- Jeremy Horner (Bangkok, Thailand)
- Crispin Hughes (London, UK)
- Rob Huibers (Utrecht, Netherlands)
- Jan Johannessen (Oslo, Norway)
- Justin Jin (Brussels, Belgium)
- Rhodri Jones (Bologna, Italy)
- Kemal Jufri (Jakarta, Indonesia)
- Alban Kakulya (Lausanne, Switzerland)
- Ivan Kashinsky (Quito, Ecuador)
- Chris Keulen (Maastricht, Netherlands)
- Kacper Kowalski (Gdynia, Poland)
- Suzanne Lee (Kuala Lumpur, Malaysia)
- Atul Loke (Mumbai, India)
- Georgios Makkas (Athens, Greece)
- Piotr Malecki (Warsaw, Poland)
- Guy Martin (Istanbul, Turkey)
- Eduardo Martino (Rio de Janeiro, Brazil)
- Jenny Matthews (London, UK)
- Sergey Maximishin (St Petersburg, Russia)
- Ramin Mazur (Chisinau, Republic of Moldova)
- Andrew McConnell (Beirut, Lebanon)
- Eric Miller (Cape Town, South Africa)
- Lianne Milton (Rio de Janeiro, Brazil)
- Fernando Moleres (Barcelona, Spain)
- James Morgan (London, UK)
- Fredrik Naumann (Oslo, Norway)
- Heldur Netocny (Stockholm, Sweden)
- Mads Nissen (Copenhagen, Denmark)
- James Oatway (Johannesburg, South Africa)
- Jeroen Oerlemans (Amsterdam, Netherlands)
- George Osodi (Lagos, Nigeria)
- Mikkel Ostergaard (Copenhagen, Denmark)
- Warrick Page (Amman, Jordan)
- Chryssa Panoussiadou (Istanbul, Turkey)
- Adam Patterson (Dublin, Ireland)
- Tom Pilston (Oxford, UK)
- Giacomo Pirozzi (Florence, Italy)
- Ivor Prickett (Istanbul, Turkey)
- Nyani Quarmyne (Accra, Ghana)
- Espen Rasmussen (Oslo, Norway)
- Eric Rechsteiner (Tokyo, Japan)
- Markel Redondo (Bayonne, France)
- Martin Roemers (Delft, Netherlands)
- David Rose (London, UK)
- Marcus Rose (London, UK)
- JB Russell (Paris, France)
- Marc Schlossman (London, UK)
- Ahikam Seri (Jerusalem, Israel)
- Qilai Shen (Shanghai, China)
- Marc Shoul (Johannesburg, South Africa)
- Jacob Silberberg (Boston, USA)
- Lana Slezic (Toronto, Canada)
- Paul Smith (Medellin, Colombia)
- Tim Smith (West Yorkshire, UK)
- Vlad Sokhin (Chiang Mai, Thailand)
- Brian Sokol (Kathmandu, Nepal)
- Carlos Spottorno (Madrid, Spain)
- Bjoern Steinz (Prague, Czech Republic)
- Chris Stowers (Taipei, Taiwan)
- Sean Sutton (Manchester, UK)
- Dermot Tatlow (Washington, D.C. USA)
- Ian Teh (Kuala Lumpur, Malaysia)
- Dieter Telemans (Brussels, Belgium)
- Andrew Testa (London, UK)
- Sven Torfinn (Nairobi, Kenya)
- Abbie Trayler-Smith (London, UK)
- Stephan Vanfleteren (Brussels, Belgium)
- Teun Voeten (Brussels, Belgium)
- Aubrey Wade (London, UK)
- Robert Wallis (London, UK)
- Petterik Wiggers (Addis Ababa, Ethiopia)
- Graeme Williams (Johannesburg, South Africa)
- Ian Willms (Toronto, Canada)
- Iva Zimova (Prague, Czech Republic)

== Publications ==
- Amnesty International: Celebrating Human Dignity and Freedom: Photos by Panos Pictures. New York: Universe, 2010. ISBN 978-0789321275. Amnesty International wall calendar.
- Amnesty International: 2013: Photos by Panos Pictures. New York: Universe, 2012. ISBN 978-0789325211. Amnesty International wall calendar.
- Amnesty International: 2015: Photos by Panos Pictures. New York: Universe, 2014. ISBN 978-0789328151. Amnesty International wall calendar.
- Agenda-Diary 2015: Photographs by Panos Pictures. ASIN B005KJJIYA. Amnesty International weekly planner.

== Exhibitions ==
- Coffee and Cafes, Society Café, Bath, 27 March 2012 – ?. Photographs by Panos Pictures photographers Adam Hinton, Alfredo D’Amato, Mark Henley, Ivor Prickett, Fredrik Naumann, George Georgiou, Chris Stowers, Stefan Boness, Alfredo Caliz, Stuart Freedman, Tim Dirven and Liba Taylor.
- Call the World Brother, Aberystwyth Arts Centre, 23 May – 14 July 2013. Photographs by Panos Pictures photographers GMB Akash, Chloe Dewe Mathews, Robin Hammond, Chris Keulen, Andrew McConnell, Espen Rasmussen, Martin Roemers and Stephan Vanfleteren. Coincided with The Eye International Photography Festival and represented 25 years of Panos Pictures.
- #FutureofCities, Somerset House, London, 24 April – 10 May 2015.

== See also ==
- Agence Vu
- Black Star (photo agency)
- Gamma (agency)
- Magnum Photos
- Sygma (agency)
- VII Photo Agency
