= Fatemi =

Fatemi may refer to:

- Hossein Fatemi, Iranian scholar, journalist, and politician
- Hossein Fatemi (photographer), Iranian photographer
- Hossein Fatemi (psychiatrist), American-Iranian psychiatrist and professor of psychiatry at the University of Minnesota
- Mohammad Amin Fatemi, a noted Afghan physician and politician
- Faraz Fatemi, Iranian footballer
- Mehrab Fatemi, Iranian Strongman and Powerlifter
