= Smita Bharti =

Indian social activist, playwright and director

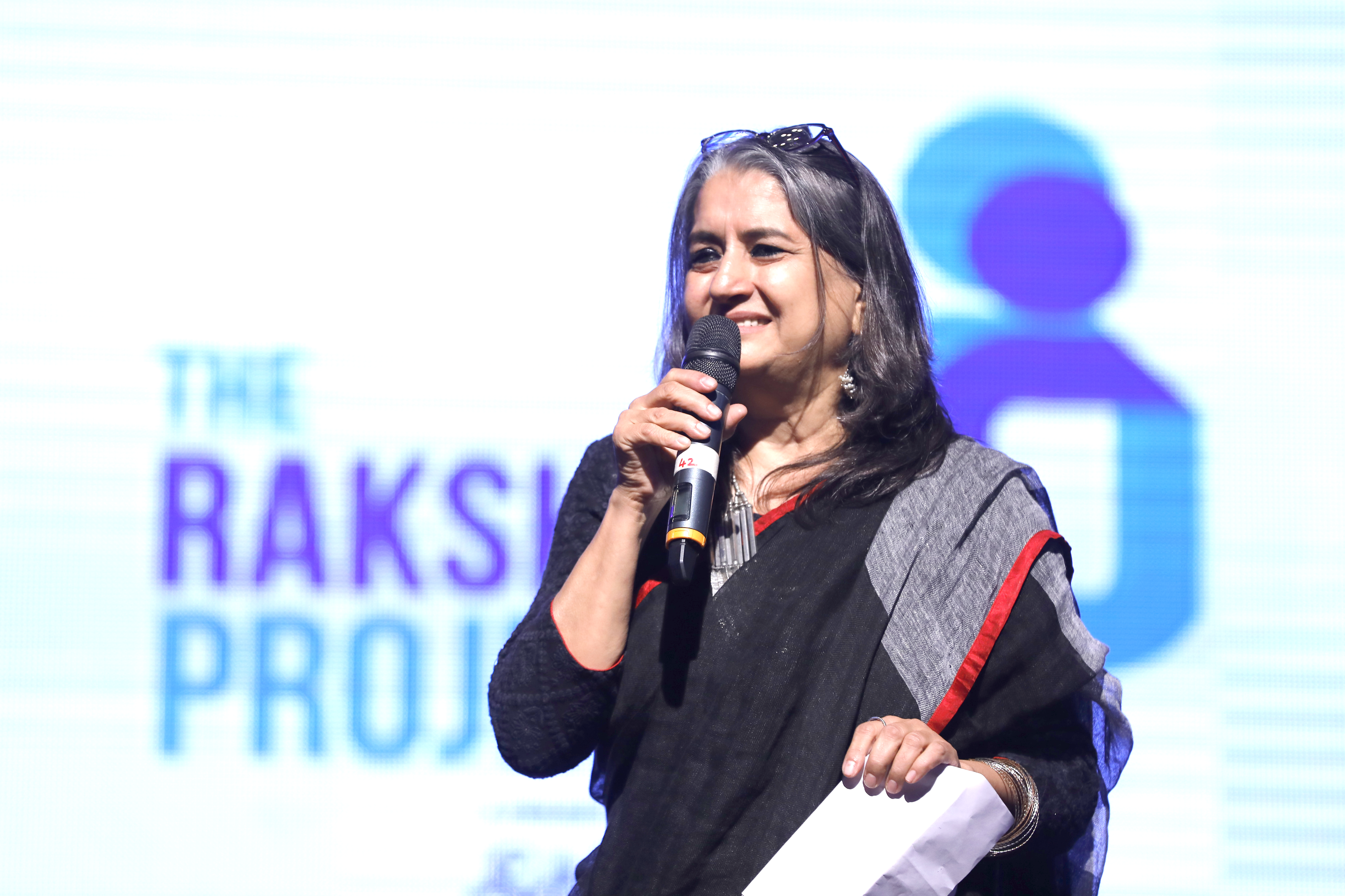
- Smita Bharti talking about The Rakshin Project at Samaagati 2019
- Born: 2 August 1964 (age 62); Bhilai, Chhattisgarh India
- Occupations: Social Activist, Playwright, Director
- Years active: 1995–present
- Organization: Sakshi

Smita Bharti is an Indian social activist, playwright and director. She has written and directed over 20 plays with communities spanning social, class and age strata. Through research, training, workshops, performances, campaigns and publications, she works extensively and intensively with women and adolescents in difficult and challenging circumstances, in prisons with victims under trial, with survivors in situations of domestic violence, sexual abuse and incest, physically and mentally challenged individuals. She also works with the policy and decision makers who have the potential of making systemic change in the country.

== Early life and education ==
Bharti was born in Bhilai, Chhattisgarh in 1964 to Nirmal and Agya Ram Kshetrapal. She did her schooling at Auckland School Shimla where she was introduced to the world of theatre at the age of 5, reading several original three-act comedy plays housed at the Gaiety Theatre, Shimla. A voracious reader and a loner, books were her companions that fuelled her imagination, gave her comfort, held her aching heart, provided frameworks to interpret relationships, examine experiences, and interrogate structures.

In 1982, Bharti moved to Delhi where she received her bachelor's degree in Literature and Psychology from University of Delhi in 1985. She received her Master of Arts degree in Literature from the Annamalai University, Tamil Nadu in 1987. Bharti's life took a turn when she realised that the domestic violence she had suffered after her marriage wasn't her identity, that she had to transcend the barriers and scars to go beyond the personal. In 1995, she embarked on a journey towards a better life as a single parent of two.

== Theatre ==
Since 2000, Bharti has engaged people in the art of storytelling and role playing that enable re-scripting of personal narratives to arrive at action points that lead to sustainable social & behaviour change and peace building. Bharti has written and directed over 20 plays, worked on films, video installations, interactive exhibitions and audio books She has been a programme consultant to Sanskriti Museums and The Asian Heritage Foundation.

In 2004, Bharti led a project in Tihar Jail in Delhi as part of a project with WISCOMP. Beyond Silences: Docu-Theatre in Jail & Outside entailed a series of theatre workshops in jail and outside, designed to explore human rights issues on both sides of the wall. Using skilful creative methods, participants were encouraged to become co-explorers, question internalised norms, engage in a process of self-expression, and make critical choices. A unique co-production between jail inmates and college students was mounted in the jail in December 2004. The project also gave way to a theatrical play Jailbirds which explored the journey of a woman near the end of her 14-year jail term for killing her abusive husband.

In 2005, Bharti founded the Hungry Heart Festival at the India Habitat Centre to explore contemporary lifestyles and personal relationships through theatre. Some of her plays are As the Sun Sets, Walk Once More, 45”35”55”, Single Mingle, Rubaru: Raj Kapoor in Russia, Rooh ka Ghar, Blind Date, Nun and the prostitute, Jailbrds, Miss Blossom Callahan Patialewalli. In 2013, she wrote and directed Jug Jug Jiyo which went on to win the UNFPA Laadli Media Award for Best Play.

== Social Change and Justice ==
In 1995, Bharti started working with Sakshi a pioneering rights-based NGO co-founded by Naina Kapur and Jasjit Purewal where she worked with women who had been through domestic violence and sexual abuse. She began working on altering systemic responses to inequality through creative interventions that focus on behavioural change. She officially took over the organisation as Executive Director in 2007. Since then, she has spearheaded several systemic interventions, campaigns, social artistry and communication for development projects.

Sakshi’s effort over two decades, finally materialised after the 2012 Delhi gang rape and murder, resulting in the Sexual Harassment of Women at Workplace (Prevention, Prohibition and Redressal) Act, 2013. Bharti along with founder, Kapur spearheaded many national level consultations to ensure that the legislation is placed under the equality umbrella and upkeeps the progressive aspects of Vishaka Guidelines, which was a result of Kapur's landmark Public Interest Litigation, Vishakha and others v State of Rajasthan.

Taare Jab Utare Zameen Par' Designed and led by Bharti in 2016 was a social arts project for behaviour change with street connected children from difficult circumstances. In association with Plan International and its 8 NGO partners. The creative workshop, involving Music, Dance, Theatre, Puppetry, Martial Arts and Substantive Training looked at awakening their sense of identity and equipping them with their rights as citizens of India.

In 2018, Sakshi received a directive from the Directorate of National Service Scheme, Ministry of Youth Affairs and Sports, Government of India, to deliver workshops to 40,000 Colleges Pan India to prevent, prohibit and redress Child Sexual Abuse. Bharti, then conceived and designed The Rakshin Project as programme to skill-build 4 million youth Pan-India as preventers of gender-based violence with a focus on Child Sexual Abuse.

Over the years, Bharti has designed campaigns on various social issues. Steer to Safety was a campaign for traffic safety in association with 200 schools, Delhi Traffic Police, PVR Nest, and 10 NGOs. NaNa was a campaign through theatre in schools and colleges to speak up against Child Sexual Abuse. Is it Hurting or Flirting? was aimed at raising awareness and speaking up against sexual harassment in the workplace enabling complainants to speak up without fear of shame, stigma and backlash.

In 2019, Bharti along with filmmaker, Natashja Rathore established SBOX a Communication for Development vertical by Sakshi. Empanelled with the National Film Development Corporation of India, SBOX has worked on national campaigns such as the Beti Bachao, Beti Padhao Yojana under the Ministry of Women & Child Development, #YesToPOSH. for prevention of workplace sexual harassment and #LetsTalk for mental health, for the National Commission for Women as well as Bhashasangam. and Kala Utsav. to promote diversity and inclusion for the Ministry of Human Resource Development, Government of India.

Owing to the spike in home-bound violence during the COVID-19 pandemic and an emergence of the Shadow Pandemic, as termed by the United Nations, Bharti, through SBOX launched a campaign Make Home a Safe Space that offered free capacity building workshops to equip bystanders to prevent gender-based and sexual violence in their families and communities. The campaign was supported by several celebrities and influencers including Sonakshi Sinha, Sonu Nigam, Manoj Bajpayee, Neena Gupta, Masaba Gupta & R. Madhavan.

Bharti continues to lead Sakshi with utmost commitment and has emerged as a role-model for several young girls and women across India. Under Bharti's leadership, Sakshi has been awarded the prestigious ASSOCHAM Award for Outstanding Contribution towards Systemic Change for Gender Equality.

== Plays ==
- Yellow Wallpaper (2000)
- Rooh Ka Ghar: The Most Important Question (2001)
- Suraksha (2001)
- Bhanwar (2001)
- Saatwan Darwaaza (2002)
- One is Not Enough (Series of 10 Short Plays) (2003)
- At Play (Multimedia Installation) British Council (2003)
- It's Not a Play (2004)
- Khel (2004)
- Jailbirds (2005)
- 45'35'55 (2006)
- Nun & The Prostitute (2007)
- Blind Date (2007)
- As the Sun Sets (2008)
- Rubaru: Raj Kapoor in Russia (2009)
- Walk Once More (2009)
- Nana(2011)
- Miss Blossom Callahan Patialewaali (2012)
- Uncoupled Couple (2013)
- Jug Jug Jiyo (2013)
- Single Mingle (2015)
- Amavas Se Amaltas (2016)
- Agaaz (2017)
- Gup Chup Gapp (2019)
- Ghat Ghat Mein Panchi Bolta Hai (2021)

== Memberships ==
In 2013, Bharti was appointed a member of the Central Advisory Committee of the Government of India on combating of trafficking of women and children for commercial sexual exploitation. Other than that, she is also a Rotary Global Peace Fellow, Fellow of the KK Birla Foundation and Special Fellow of WISCOMP.

== Awards ==
In 2013, Bharti won the UNFPA Laadli Media Award for her play Jug Jug Jiyo. Following which in 2016, she received the Karmaveer Chakra Award for Social Change & Justice and the Woman of the Elements Chakra. In 2021, Bharti won the 40 Over 40 award by SheThePeople and the Global Women Inspiration Award.
