= Sheed Award =

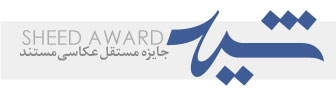
- Founded: 2010, Iran
- Founder: Roshan Norouzi
- Purpose: Social Documentary photography
- Origins: Iran
- Website: www.sheedaward.ir

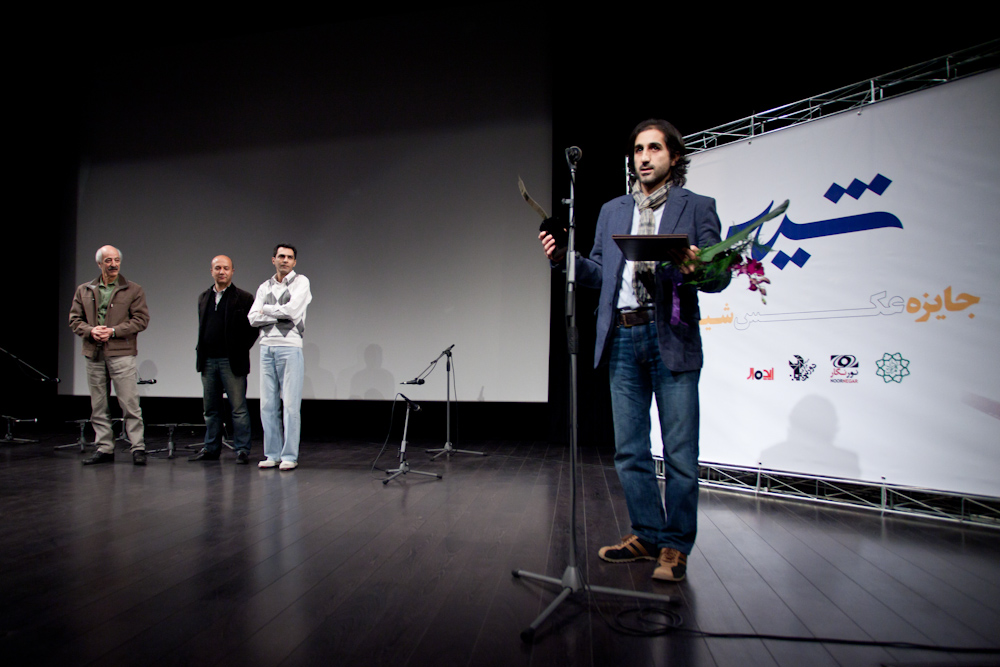
Behrouz Mehri, the winner of Sheed Award 2010. Photo: Ali Kaveh

Sheed Award is an independent, non-profit and non-governmental photography award that goes to a social documentary photographer annually. Founded in 2010, the award is known for encouraging and promoting social documentary among Iranian photographers.

== 2010 ==
The jury of Sheed award 2010, including Ed Kashi, Kamran Jebreyili, Kaveh Kazemi, Jahangir Razmi and Peyman Hooshmandzadeh, nominated seven men among more than 230 photographers to receive the award.

The nominated photographers were as follows: Majid Saeedi, Hossein Fatemi (photographer), Abotaleb Nadri, Behrouz Mehri, Hamed Khorshidi, Ali Hamed Haghdoost and Mohammad Reza Soltani and finally Behrouz Mehri from Agence France-Presse (AFP) got the award.

== 2011 ==
The jury of Sheed award 2011, including Shahidul Alam, Manoocher Deghati, Kaveh Kazemi, Mohsen Rastani and Hossein Fatemi (photographer), nominated seven people among more than 460 photographers to receive the award.

The nominated photographers were as follows: Azin Haghighi, Abolfazl Nesanii, Babak Bordbar, Tahmineh Monzavi, Hamed Badami, Sina Shiri and Mohammad Reza Soltani and finally Tahmineh Monzavi got the award.
