= Monzavi =

Monzavi is a surname. Notable people with the surname include:

- Hossein Monzavi (1946–2004), Iranian poet, essayist and translator
- Tahmineh Monzavi, Iranian photographer
