= Modern Times: Photography in the 20th Century =

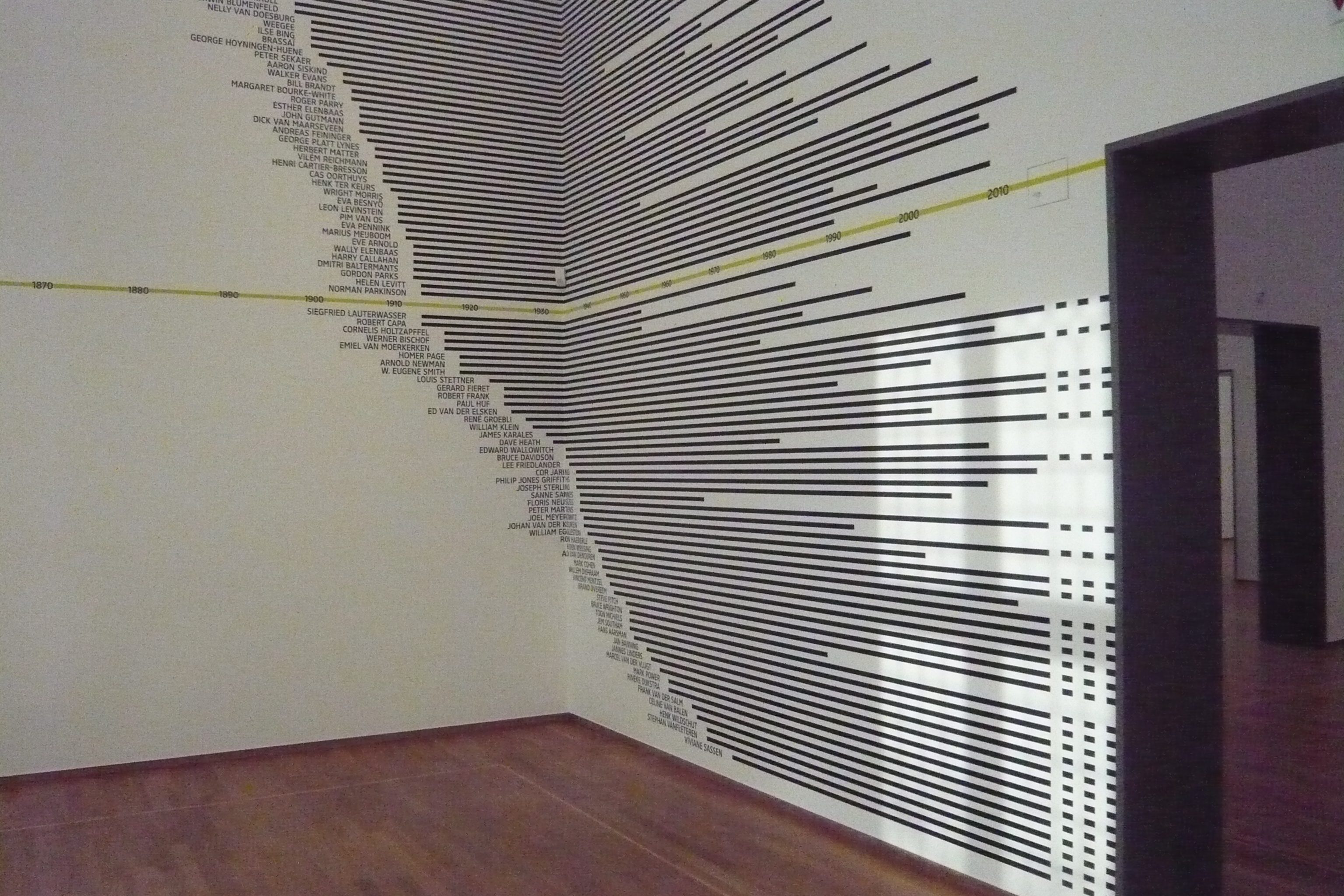
A timeline of all the photographers with works in the exhibition

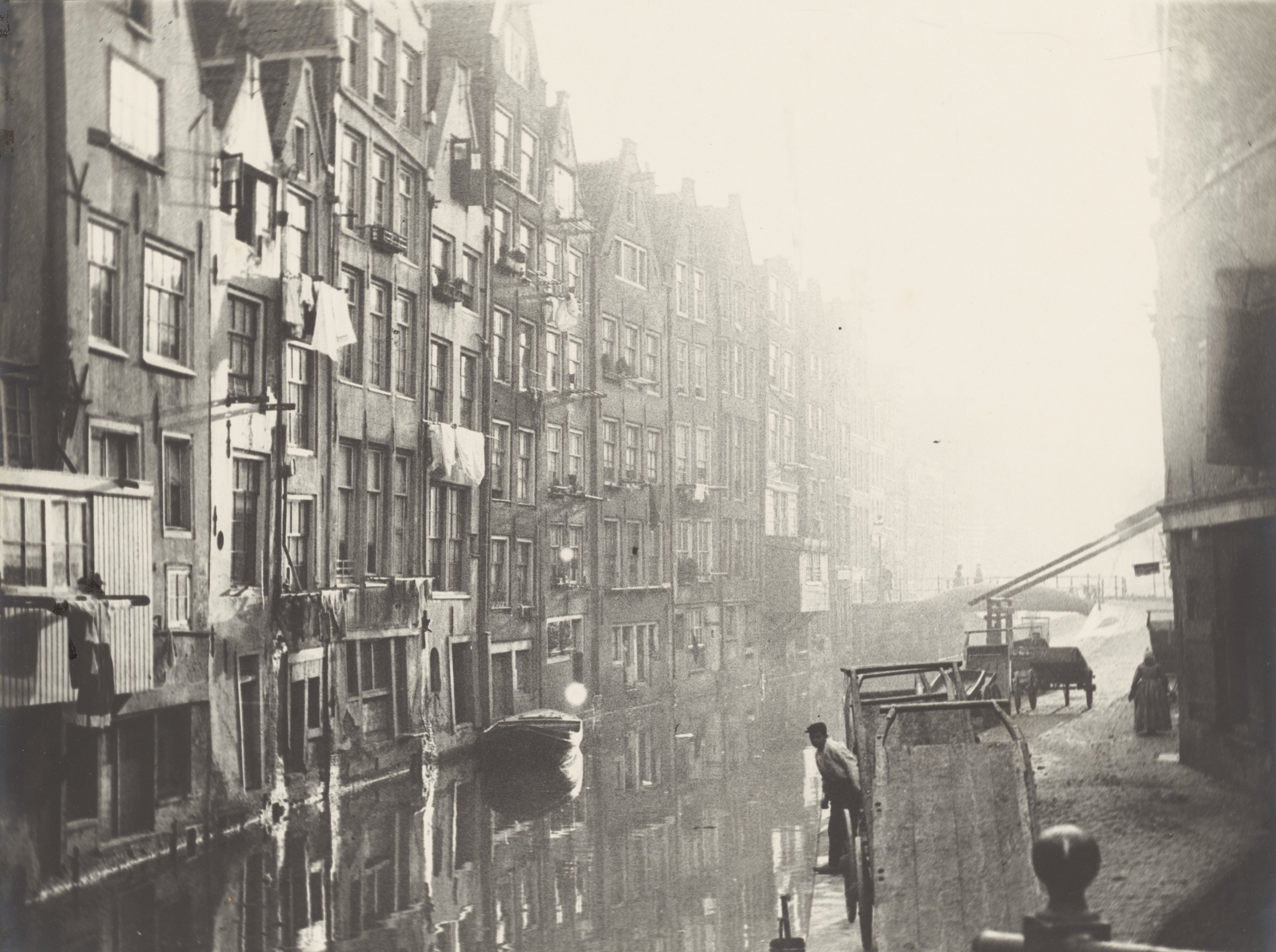
George Hendrik Breitner is an example of a cross-over artist who used photography as a basis for his paintings. His photographs of Amsterdam such as this view of "Oudezijds Kolk" can be seen as an artist's sketchbook. This photograph is one of three in the collection that first made their way into the museum Highlights guide in 1995.

Modern Times: Photography in the 20th Century was the first exhibition focussed on artists of the 20th century to be held by the Rijksmuseum in Amsterdam. The show, whose title is also Modern Times in Dutch and which ran from November 2014 to January 2015, was also the first exhibition to be held in the re-opened Philips Wing, a part of the museum that was remodeled to host temporary exhibitions. It was the museum's second photography exhibition after its successful A new art: Photography in the 19th century, held in 1996.

== Background ==
The Rijksmuseum published a jubilee book in 1985 celebrating 100 years of its history. This contained numerous old photographs of construction and early museum displays that could not be attributed to individual photographers, but uncovered several gems in the collection that needed curation. The museum highlights guide produced in the same year did not yet include any of the museum's 130,000 photographs of the 19th century. Photography was apparently still considered a secondary art, and, as such, not deserving mention in the guidebook. It wasn't until 1994, when the museum appointed the current (as of 2014) curators Mattie Boom and Hans Rooseboom for its growing photography collection, that a shift in appreciation began. The highlights guide published in 1995 included three photographs: one by each of Gustave Le Gray, Eduard Isaac Asser, and George Hendrik Breitner. The next step was to hold a photography exhibition, which became A new art, a collaboration with the Van Gogh Museum in 1996.

== The 20th century in photographs ==
The museum's collection of over 20,000 20th-century photographs includes images of government-sponsored works such as bridges and sluice gates, and images of inspection visits by paid agents to foreign lands. Many early photographers could not afford to make prints without government sponsorship of some kind. Besides works acquired from defunct government agencies, works have been donated by photographers' families and other purchases have been sponsored by friends of the museum. The exhibition is meant as an overview of the museum's 20th-century works, most of which have been acquired since 1994.

The oldest photos in the exhibition are by the oldest artist in the show: Eadward Muybridge's motion studies of a horse (Sallie Gardner at a Gallop). The first photograph in the show is a portrait of Susan Sontag by Peter Hujar. Her collection of essays On Photography was quoted as one of the sources of inspiration for the show ("To collect photography is to collect the world"). The last works in the show are color portrait photos taken in Suriname by the youngest artist in the show, the Dutch photographer Viviane Sassen.

The list of artists represented in the show is presented on the gallery wall as a timeline. In order of appearance (sorted by birth date), they are as follows:

- Eadweard Muybridge (9 April 1830 – 8 May 1904)
- Arnaud Pistoor (4 September 1837 – 17 December 1905)
- Maurice Guibert (1856–1913)
- Eugène Atget (12 February 1857 – 4 August 1927)
- George Hendrik Breitner (12 September 1857 – 5 June 1923)
- Jacob Evert Wesenhagen (1862–1924)
- Bertha Jaques (24 October 1863 – 30 March 1941)
- Richard Tepe (28 August 1864 – 16 May 1952)
- Alfred Stieglitz (1 January 1864 – 13 July 1946)
- Jan Hendrik Pistoor (12 October 1865 – 20 March 1923)
- Karl Blossfeldt (13 June 1865 – 9 December 1932)
- Charles Jones (1866 – 15 November 1959)
- Théodore van Lelyveld (18 February 1867 – 7 October 1954)
- Adolph de Meyer (1 September 1868 – 6 January 1946)
- Arnold Genthe (8 January 1869 – 9 August 1942)
- Pierre Pullis (1869–1942)
- Jan Adriani (1874–1948)
- Lewis Hine (26 September 1874 – 3 November 1940)
- E. O. Hoppé (14 April 1878 – 9 December 1972)
- Edward Steichen (27 March 1879 – 25 March 1973)
- Hendrik Teding van Berkhout (26 August 1879 – 15 May 1969)
- Christiaan Otto Roelofs
- Theo van Doesburg (30 August 1883 – 7 April 1931 and 7 March 1931)
- Piet Zwart (28 May 1885 – 24 September 1977)
- Karl Struss (30 November 1886 – 15 December 1981)
- Edward Weston (24 March 1886 – 1 January 1958)
- Maximovitch
- Hannes Meyer (18 November 1889 – 19 July 1954)
- Paul Strand (16 October 1890 – 31 March 1976)
- Luke Swank (1890–1944)
- Man Ray (27 August 1890 – 18 November 1976)
- Jacques Henri Lartigue (13 June 1894 – 12 September 1986)
- André Kertész (2 July 1894 and 7 February 1894 – 28 September 1985 and 29 September 1985)
- László Moholy-Nagy (20 July 1895 – 24 November 1946 and 21 November 1946)
- Franz Spreng (1895–1982)
- Dorothea Lange (26 May 1895 and 25 May 1895 – 11 October 1965)
- John Albok (1894–1982)
- Josef Breitenbach (3 April 1896 – 7 October 1984)
- Lotte Jacobi (17 August 1896 – 6 May 1990)
- Albert Renger-Patzsch (22 June 1897 – 27 September 1966)
- Germaine Krull (29 November 1897 and 20 November 1897 – 31 July 1985)
- Erwin Blumenfeld (26 January 1897 – 4 July 1969)
- Nelly van Doesburg (27 July 1899 – 1 October 1975)
- Weegee (12 June 1899 – 26 December 1968)
- Ilse Bing (23 March 1899 – 10 March 1998)
- Brassaï (9 September 1899 – 8 July 1984 and 7 July 1984)
- George Hoyningen-Huene (4 September 1900 – 12 September 1968)
- Peter Sekaer (1901–1950)
- Aaron Siskind (4 December 1903 – 8 February 1991)
- Walker Evans (3 November 1903 – 10 April 1975)
- Bill Brandt (2 May 1904 and 3 May 1904 – 20 December 1983)
- Margaret Bourke-White (14 June 1904 – 27 August 1971)
- Roger Parry (13 November 1905 – 4 May 1977)
- Esther Elenbaas (1905 – 12 September 1998)
- John Gutmann (28 May 1905 – 12 June 1998)
- Dick van Maarseveen (24 February 1905 – 17 August 1990)
- Andreas Feininger (27 December 1906 – 18 February 1999)
- George Platt Lynes (15 April 1907 – 6 December 1955)
- Herbert Matter (25 April 1907 – 8 May 1984)
- Vilém Reichmann (25 April 1908 – 15 June 1991)
- Henri Cartier-Bresson (22 August 1908 – 3 August 2004 and 2 August 2004)
- Cas Oorthuys (1 November 1908 – 22 July 1975)
- Henk ter Keurs
- Wright Morris (6 January 1910 – 25 April 1998)
- Eva Besnyö (29 April 1910 – 12 December 2003)
- Leon Levinstein (1910–1988)
- Pim van Os (9 February 1910 – 9 June 1954)
- Eva Pennink (11 October 1911 – 5 February 2008)
- Marius Meijboom (11 October 1911 – 11 September 1998)
- Eve Arnold (21 April 1912 – 4 January 2012)
- Wally Elenbaas (21 April 1912 – 21 May 2008)
- Harry Callahan (photographer) (22 October 1912 – 15 March 1999)
- Dmitri Baltermants (13 May 1912 – 11 June 1990)
- Gordon Parks (30 November 1912 – 7 March 2006)
- Helen Levitt (31 August 1913 – 29 March 2009)
- Norman Parkinson (21 April 1913 – 15 February 1990)
- Siegfried Lauterwasser (16 April 1913 – 7 September 2000)
- Robert Capa (22 October 1913 – 25 May 1954)
- Cornelis Holtzapffel (10 November 1916 – 23 September 1984)
- Werner Bischof (26 April 1916 – 16 May 1954)
- Emiel van Moerkerken (15 August 1916 – 6 March 1995)
- Homer Page (1918–1985)
- Arnold Newman (3 March 1918 – 6 June 2006)
- W. Eugene Smith (30 December 1918 – 15 October 1978)
- Louis Stettner (born 7 November 1922)
- Gerard Fieret (1924 – 22 January 2009)
- Robert Frank (born 9 November 1924)
- Paul Huf (14 March 1924 – 9 January 2002)
- Ed van der Elsken (10 March 1925 – 28 December 1990)
- René Groebli (born 9 October 1927)
- William Klein (photographer) (born 19 April 1928)
- James Karales (1930–2002)
- Dave Heath (27 June 1931 – June 27, 2016)
- Edward Wallowitch (5 May 1932 – 25 March 1981)
- Bruce Davidson (photographer) (born 5 September 1933)
- Lee Friedlander (born 14 July 1934)
- Cor Jaring (18 December 1936 – 17 November 2013)
- Philip Jones Griffiths (18 February 1936 – 19 March 2008)
- Joseph Sterling (1936 – November 2010)
- Sanne Sannes (19 March 1937 – 23 March 1967)
- Floris Michael Neusüss (born 3 March 1937)
- Peter Martens (1 March 1937 – 16 April 1992)
- Joel Meyerowitz (born 6 March 1938)
- Johan van der Keuken (4 April 1938 – 7 January 2001)
- William Eggleston (born 27 July 1939)
- Ronald L. Haeberle (born 1941)
- Koen Wessing (26 January 1942 – 3 February 2011)
- Ad van Denderen (born 7 October 1943)
- Mark Cohen (photographer) (born 1943)
- Willem Diepraam (born 13 April 1944)
- Vincent Mentzel (born 28 September 1945)
- Brand Overeem (born 6 September 1946)
- Steve Fitch (born 1942)
- Bruce Wrighton (1950 – 1988)
- Toon Michiels (born 1950)
- Jem Southam (born 1950)
- Hans Aarsman (born 1951)
- Jan Banning (born 4 May 1954)
- Jannes Linders (born 23 May 1955)
- Marcel van der Vlugt (born 1957)
- Mark Power (born 1959)
- Rineke Dijkstra (born 2 June 1959)
- Frank van der Salm (born 5 November 1964)
- Céline van Balen (born 1965)
- Henk Wildschut (born 1967)
- Stephan Vanfleteren (born 1969)
- Viviane Sassen (born 5 July 1972)
