= IOM X =

Human trafficking awareness campaign

The IOM X campaign is a multimedia initiative produced by the International Organization for Migration. The campaign aims to raise awareness and increase the prevention of human trafficking and modern slavery.

The campaign began in 2014, based out of Bangkok, working in partnership with IOM offices in Indonesia, Singapore, Malaysia, Thailand, Laos, Cambodia, Vietnam, Myanmar, and Bangladesh, to develop outreach activities that protect vulnerable people from exploitation. The campaign does this through applying a Communication for Development framework, which involves creating and tailoring media content around robust first-hand research to inspire positive behaviour change by target audiences.

While originally developed to prevent human trafficking and exploitation in ASEAN and Bangladesh, materials developed for the campaign have been translated into 18 languages and used in 40 countries around the world.

== Campaign launches ==
=== Indonesia ===
In 2014, IOM X launched "Open Doors" in Indonesia. The 22-minute video aims to raise awareness of the exploitation of domestic workers in Southeast Asia. Millions of domestic workers are at risk of exploitation behind closed doors at the hands of their employers.

=== Thailand ===
In April 2018, IOM X launched "Do You Know Who Made It?". The project aimed to engage young Thai consumers in issues surrounding human trafficking and exploitation in the manufacturing industry. IOM X engaged five of Thailand's most popular YouTube creators to create original video content. The campaign was developed in response to rising spending power in Asia which, while indicating a rise in living standards, has also driven up demand for cheap labour in factories making products that range from garments in Bangladesh to shoes in Cambodia and Vietnam.

=== Myanmar ===
In July 2018 IOM X launched "Make Migration Work" in Myanmar. The eight-part series aimed to educate people thinking of migrating overseas for work about the correct process they should follow in order to stay safe.

=== Bangladesh ===
In October 2017, IOM X premiered a video series to help aspirant Bangladeshi migrants obtain the right documentation before the leave home for work. IOM X research found that many Bangladeshis were at risk of deception after going abroad for employment due to not having the right visas and work permits from their broker.

== Productions ==
=== Open Doors ===
Open doors: Singapore (January 2017) A video drama following the story of Lisa, a Filipina domestic worker in Singapore, and the abuse she suffers at the hand of her abusive employer.

=== Unexpected Victim ===
Unexpected Victim (January 2018) This short film was part of a broader campaign to help combat human trafficking for sexual exploitation. The film was created by Australian producer Dejan Rasik.

=== Prisana ===
Prisana (September 2015) A short film based in Thailand, Prisana aimed at bringing the issue of modern slavery in the fishing industry to a young audience. The film was directed by Thai director and actor Ananda Everingham.
