= Panos Network =

Network of independent non-governmental institutes

The Panos Network (originally called Panos Institute) is a network of independent non-governmental institutes working "to ensure that information is effectively used to foster public debate, pluralism and democracy" (see Communication for Development).

There are currently six member institutes: Panos Caribbean, Panos Europe, Panos West Africa, Panos Eastern Africa, Panos Southern Africa and Panos South Asia. The member institutes participate in a global network, through which they work on common themes. Jon Tinker also founded Panos Institutes in London, Paris, Washington, Budapest and Canada.

Globally and regionally, Panos Network works with media and other information actors to enable developing countries to shape and communicate their own development agendas through informed public debate. They particularly focus on amplifying the voices of poor and marginalised people.

The name Panos may have some connection with the ancient Greek word phanos (φανός), which means torch. Influences may also be found from the Nepali word panas, which is a lamp lit when people gather round to discuss important issues.

== Origins ==
The first institute, based in London, was founded in 1986 by journalist Jon Tinker. Tinker had been working with the International Institute for Environment and Development (IIED), where he ran the Earthscan programme, focused on providing unbiased, scientific data to journalists covering environmental issues. Tinker identified the need to develop resources helpful in providing information and data on a range of issues that directly affect the most marginalized voices in the developing world, to help those voices be heard, and help bridge the communications' divide. Between 1991 and 2004, Jon Tinker also founded Panos Institutes in Paris, Washington D.C., Budapest and Vancouver, Canada.

The organisation's first major project was for Swedish International Development Cooperation Agency (Sida), producing studies on the sustainability of Nordic aid programmes, written by journalists based in the recipient countries.

Panos subsequently followed that method, having reports written by people from the developing world. Jon Tinker described this as, "Providing authentic Southern voices on Southern issues".

Since its inception, Panos has run a number of programmes relating to issues affecting developing countries. These include an environment programme, a media development programme, an AIDS/HIV programme and an oral testimony programme. It was one of the first non-governmental organisations to highlight HIV/AIDS as a development issue, producing a dossier in 1986 entitled AIDS and the Third World.

Panos Pictures, a photo agency, was founded and partly owned by Panos London. Panos London ceased its activities in 2013.

== Panos Institute Southern Africa ==
The Panos Institute Southern Africa (PSAf) is a regional communication for development non-governmental organization (NGO), with offices in Zambia, Mozambique and South Africa. PSAf promotes informed and inclusive participation of marginalised people in public and policy debates and decision-making processes that affect their lives.

As a regional NGO, the vision of PSAf is to "empower the poor and marginalized to drive their development agenda, by ensuring that information is effectively used to foster development, by empowering communities to shape their own agenda". The focus is on amplifying the voices of the poor and marginalized, to ensure that their voices have influence in the development arena by stimulating informed debate, mainly through the media and ICTs.

PSAf's work focuses on the following:

- Media Development and ICTs
- Heath and Development
- Governance and Development
- Environment and Natural Resources Management
- Cross-cutting issues of human rights, gender and vulnerable groups are mainstreamed in all of PSAf's programme areas.
