= C4D =

C4D may refer to:

- Complement component 4d.
- Animation Software Cinema 4D.
- Communication for Development
