= George Osodi =

Nigerian photographer

George Osodi (born 1974) is a Nigerian photographer from Ogwashi Ukwu, Delta State.

== Background and career ==
He studied business administration at the Yaba College of Technology in Lagos between 1996 and 1999. He was a photojournalist at The Comet newspaper from 1999 to 2002. He moved on to the Associated Press from 2002 to 2008. He got a Professional National Diploma in documentary making from the London Academy of Media, Film and TV in 2009.

His works have appeared in Bloomberg, Time, The Guardian, The New York Times, Telegraph newspapers, USA Today, CNN, and BBC Focus on Africa magazine. He is a member of Panos Pictures UK. His works have been exhibited at Museumslandschaft Hessen Kassel in Germany; the Neue Galerie in New York City, US, and the Newark Museum of Art.

Osodi spent several years documenting the impact of oil extraction in the Niger Delta.

== Awards ==
Osodi won first prize at the Fuji African Photojournalist of the Year competition in 2004 in the Features and Portfolio categories.
