= Aubrey Wade =

British photographer and photojournalist

- Born: 1977 (age 48–49)
- Occupation: Photographer
- Partner: Sarah Böttcher
- Website: www.aubreywade.com

Aubrey Wade (born 1977) is a British photographer and photojournalist / documentary photographer best known for his work in Niger and Sierra Leone. He is affiliated with the Panos Pictures photo agency. Wade carries out long-term documentary projects, assignments for publications, and projects for NGOs. He lives in London and Berlin.

== Career ==
Wade is an "Anglo-Dutchman", born to British parents in the Netherlands. He studied social anthropology at Sussex University and thereafter returned to college to study photojournalism at the University of the Arts London. His work focuses mainly on peace building, marginalised communities and human rights.

He is interested in storytelling by photography and is committed to long-term projects. He uses documentary photography to explore complex nets of social issues, such as the refugee crisis in Europe. This approach helps the audience to connect with his subjects and their experiences. His work is based on field-based research and collaborative processes. Wade has worked across Africa, the United States, Latin America, Europe, and South Asia.

Wade spent seven years exploring the lives of former fighters and marginalized youths in Sierra Leone's capital, Freetown, following the end of the war.

His most notable project is the ongoing No Stranger Place, documenting people in Austria, Germany and Sweden that voluntary housed refugees of the 2015 migrant crisis with them when state facilities were over-run. The series of portraits "places all the members of the host family alongside their adopted one [ . . . ] In some of the images it's difficult to make a distinction between host family and asylum seeker, therefore challenging the perception of refugees as 'outsiders'." The project was begun by Wade and his partner, the writer Sarah Böttcher, and they later partnered with UNHCR (the UN Refugee Agency), whose aims it mirrored, and other organisations were also brought in.

The "three-part 20-minute docu-drama", Talking Borders (2010), was co-written and produced by Wade. This fictional adaptation of a long-term field research by UK-based Conciliation Resources looks at the tension in the Mano River border region of West Africa. It was used in an outreach programme by the organisation, screening the film over the course of a year in the region.

He is affiliated with Panos Pictures, a photo agency based in London.

Wade's work has appeared regularly in weekend supplements to London newspapers The Telegraph, The Guardian, The Observer, The Sunday Times and The Independent. He has also been published in magazines Foto8, mare, D la Repubblica delle Donne, Le Point, Smithsonian and The Fader.
