= Jeroen Oerlemans =

Dutch photographer and war correspondent

- Born: 15 May 1970; Vught, Netherlands
- Died: 2 October 2016 (aged 46); Sirte, Libya
- Cause of death: Killed in action
- Occupation: photographer

Jeroen Oerlemans (15 May 1970 – 2 October 2016) was a Dutch photographer and war correspondent who reported mainly from the Near East and Afghanistan. His photographs were published in Newsweek, Time, The Guardian, International Herald Tribune, The Sunday Times and Courrier International. He was killed by an Islamic State sniper in the Libyan city of Sirte. He had previously been kidnapped whilst working in Syria alongside British journalist John Cantlie. The Jeroen Oerlemans Foundation is dedicated to his life's work, and finances accumulated from the purchase of certain pieces via the Foundation's website are dedicated to an educational fund for his three children.

== Life and work ==
Oerlemans was born in Vught in the North Brabant province of the Netherlands. He studied political science at the Amsterdam University and thereafter photojournalism at London College of Communication.

As a freelance photographer he covered several areas of conflict: Afghanistan, Haiti, Pakistan and nearly all countries of the Near East (Iraq, Iran, Lebanon, Sudan, Libya, Syria, Israel and the Palestinian Territories). In his latter years he was mostly active in Afghanistan, Libya and Syria. His photographs were published in Newsweek, Time, The Guardian, International Herald Tribune, The Sunday Times, Courrier International and elsewhere. He was represented by Panos Pictures' Panos Network, and by Hollandse Hoogte. When not on assignment Oerlemans lived in Amsterdam with his wife and children.

In July 2012, Oerlemans and the British photographer John Cantlie were kidnapped in northern Syria and detained for one week. They were freed by fighters of the Free Syrian Army. In September and the beginning of October 2016, he was on assignment in Libya, reporting for the Belgian weekly Knack. In the town of Sirte heavy fighting was going on between pro-government Libyan forces and the ISIL in Libya. Oerlemans had been scheduled to return home Monday, but was shot dead by snipers attached to the Libyan arm of Islamic State. He was taken to a hospital but doctors could do nothing for him. According to journalist Joanie de Rijke, Knack employee, Oerlemans was wearing a bulletproof vest and he had a helmet on, ″but the bullet hit him on the side, just at the opening of his vest. [...] The only consolation is that he was immediately dead, he did not suffer in any case.″

The Foreign Ministry of the Netherlands confirmed Oerlemans' death on Sunday, 2 October 2016. According to the Committee to Protect Journalists, the photographer was the third journalist to be killed in Libya this year. Bert Koenders, the Dutch Foreign Minister, paid tribute to him, saying "Oerlemans was a journalist who went through where others stopped, driven to bring the news in pictures, especially in the trouble spots of the world. A great photographer is gone."

Oerlemans is survived by his wife and three small children.

== Awards ==
- 2007: Honorable Mention prize singles, Spot News category, World Press Photo, Amsterdam
- 2007: Honorable mention, International News category, The Best of Photojournalism 2007, National Press Photographers Association, St. Petersburg, FL
- 2008: Zilveren Camera (Silver Camera), Netherlands – for his reportage on soldiers in Afghanistan
- 2010: Zilveren Camera (Silver Camera), Netherlands – for a series on illegal immigrants in Greece
- 2011: Winner, foreign news category, Zilveren Camera (Silver Camera) 2010, Netherlands – for documentation of every day life in Libya

== See also ==
- List of kidnappings
- List of solved missing person cases (post-2000)
