= Bruce Wrighton =

American photographer

Bruce Wrighton (born July 6, 1950 – October 3, 1988) was an American photographer who made work in and around Binghamton, New York. Since 2010, two monographs have been published by the Berlin-based publishing house Only Photography – Roland Angst. His work is held in the collection of the J. Paul Getty Museum, Los Angeles.

== Life and work ==
Wrighton was born in Binghamton, New York (source?). He worked as a photographer from 1986 to 1988 with an 8×10 view camera in and near to his hometown. Three series of photographs were made: one-time portraits, showing portraits of the inhabitants and the workers of Binghamton with their furrowed faces and worn-out clothing. In the second series Dinosaurs and Dreamboats, he portrayed the classic American streetcrosses of the 1950s in front of the urban architecture of this time in Binghamton. The third collection of photographs of St. George and the Dragon shows the motifs found in Binghamton and its surroundings, such as churches, pubs or apartments.

Wrighton died in 1988, aged 38.

== Publications ==
- Bruce Wrighton, At Home. Only Photography – Roland Angst. Berlin, 2010. ISBN 978-3-9816885-6-6.
- At Home Reloaded. Only Photography. Berlin, 2015. ISBN 978-3-9816885-6-6.

== Exhibitions ==
=== Solo exhibitions ===
- Bruce Wrighton. At Home, Galerie Robert Morat, Hamburg, Germany, 2011/12
- Bruce Wrighton. Downtown Men, Laurence Miller Gallery, New York City, 2014

=== Group exhibitions ===
- Modern Times: Photography in the 20th Century, Rijksmuseum, Amsterdam, 2014/15

== Collections ==
Wrighton's work is held in the following permanent collection:

- J. Paul Getty Museum, Los Angeles, CA: 8 prints (as of 14 September 2022)
