= Rhodri Jones (photographer) =

Welsh photographer

Rhodri Jones is a Welsh documentary photographer based in Bologna, Italy. He has exhibited widely and has published several volumes of photography. His work has been carried by the Panos Pictures photographic agency since 1992.

== Biography ==
Jones was born in Tregarth, Gwynedd, North Wales. His mother is from Luxembourg, his father is Welsh, so he grew up influenced by three languages; English, Welsh and German.

Since 1989 he has travelled widely, producing images from locations such as China, Albania and Wales. He has produced several volumes of personal work as well as commissioned work. He was described by fellow Welsh born photojournalist, Philip Jones Griffiths as "a Welsh poet with a camera"

== Publications ==
- Albania. An Oxfam Country Profile. Oxfam, 2000. ISBN 0855984325. Text by Neil Olsen. (Note: The book may be found here at Google Books.)
- Made in China. Modena: Logos Art, 2002. ISBN 9788879401746. Texts by Philip Jones Griffiths and Hong Ying.
- Return/Yn ôl. Bridgend, Wales: Seren, 2006. ISBN 1854114190. Foreword by Gwyneth Lewis. (Note: Page about the book, Seren.)
- Hinterland. Italy: L’artiere edizionitalia, 2010. ISBN 9788887569407. With a transcript of a conversation between Jones and Gianni Celati. (Note: Page about the book, L'Artiere.)
- Scambi ferroviari: l'azzurro del servizio ferroviario nel paesaggio bolognese. Bologna: L’artiere edizionitalia, 2011. ISBN 978-88-87569-46-9.
- So Be It. Italy: L’artiere, 2015. ISBN 9788887569612. With poems by Martin Camaj, introductions by Leonard Fox and Monica Dematté and a text by Jones.

== Exhibitions ==
- Made in China
  - 2002, Turner House Gallery, National Museum Wales, Cardiff, Wales.
  - 2003, Noorderlicht Photofestival, Groningen, Netherlands;
  - 2003 Spitz Gallery London.
  - 2003 Rome International Photo Festival.
  - 2003 Pingyao Photography Festival.
  - 2007 "Visioni di Cina", Centro Culturale Trevi, Bolzano, Italy.
- Return / Yn Ôl
  - 2006, National Library of Wales, Aberystwyth, Wales; Cynon Valley Museum and Gallery, Aberdare, Wales; Oriel Ynys Môn, Anglesey, Wales. Reduced versions of this show toured throughout Wales (2006–09).
- Go: Internal Migration in China
  - 2008, Side Gallery, Newcastle upon Tyne, England. During the show large posters, sponsored by the Look East festival, were shown on advertising billboards around the city.
  - 2008, Cynon Valley Museum and Gallery, Aberdare, Wales.
- Land of the Living Past
  - 2008, Lighthouse Media Centre, Wolverhampton, England.
  - 2009, Aberystwyth Arts Centre, Wales, UK.
  - 2010, Galleria 41ZERO30, Bomporto, Italy.
  - 2015, Mo Art space, Xinmi, Henan Province, China.
- Hinterland
  - 2010 Urban Centre, Sala Borsa, Bologna.
  - 2012, Museum of Farming Culture, Bentivoglio, Bologna, Italy.
  - 2012, Photomonth Festival, Italian Institute of Culture, Kraków, Poland.
  - 2012, Galleria Pubblica, Castel Maggiore, Italy.
