= World Congress on Communication for Development =

Conference in Rome, 2006

The first World Congress on Communication for Development (WCCD) was held in Rome, Italy from October 25 to 27, 2006.

== Main objective ==
The First World Congress on Communication for Development was hosted by the Italian Ministry of Foreign Affairs and organized by The World Bank, Food and Agriculture Organization, and The Communication Initiative. It intended to clearly demonstrate to policy and decision-makers the effectiveness of "Communication for Development" in helping meet today's most pressing development challenges and to advocate among them for the systematic inclusion of communication in development policy and practice.

Communication for Development is a process of dialogue and information sharing intended to improve the efficiency and sustainability of development projects. It is used to manage social and political risks and to establish local ownership of interventions.

== Participants ==
The WCCD, the first event of its kind, brought together more than 500 policymakers, development practitioners, NGO and CSO representatives, and academics/researchers active in the field. Thousands more from around the world were able to participate via webcasting and broadcasting.

== Organization and structure ==
FAO and the World Bank spearheaded this event, and involved more than 75 key institutions, including multilateral and bilateral partners, media institutions, academic and research institutions, and NGOs to help organize the Congress. The three party governance structure consisted of a steering committee (to provide overall advice and guidance to the planning), a Scientific Committee (to conduct the paper review and the Mainstreaming study) and an Advisory Body.

== Invitees profile ==
Nobel Prize Keynote Speakers, Highest Level of Representation from the UN and The World Bank, Italian Authorities, High Profile Public Figures, Ministries and Authorities from Developing Countries, Prime International University Representatives and Academicians.

== Themes and structure ==
The Congress was structured around four broad thematic areas: Health, Governance, Sustainable Development, and Communication Labs. During the Policymakers Forum leading policy and decision-makers discussed and debated the opportunities and constraints they envisaged vis-à-vis the proposed recommendations for mainstreaming communication in development policies and programs.

A Mainstreaming and Policy Recommendations Study commissioned by the Scientific Committee served as the basis of discussions at the Policymakers' Forum, integrated the outcomes of the Forum and was then published, together with the proceedings of sessions and papers.

== Media partners ==
Media Partners included Inter Press Service-IPS, RAI (Italy), BBC (UK) and CNBC (Germany). Additional media outlets were Al-Jazeera (Qatar), Reuters, CNN Español, and major Latin-American media; Rome-based correspondents of the international press, together with major Italian newspapers covered the event. The BBC broadcast from the Congress site its flagship program, World Debate, while CNBC broadcast the show, Global Players.

== Expectations ==
This event generated an enormous amount of interest around the world with more than 600 papers submitted through the call for papers, more than 1,700 registered through the Congress website, more than 600,000 hits on the site, and more than 2,000 people participated in pre-Congress e-discussions on Congress-related topics and themes.

One of the most extensive efforts previous to the Congress was the latinamerican seminar "Sin comunicación no hay desarrollo" (Without Communication No Development), held in August 2006 in the city of Lima (Perú) with participants from Argentina, Bolivia, Brasil, Colombia, Costa Rica, Ecuador, El Salvador, Guatemala, Perú, Uruguay, Venezuela, Germany and Italy. It reunited the following Peruvian (PE) and international institutions (I - International / LA - Latinamerican): Asociación de Comunicadores Sociales Calandria (PE), CESIP (PE), CNR (Perú), Colectivo Radial Feminista (PE), DEMUS (PE), Equipo Uno (PE), Voces Nuestras, PUCP (PE), Red Científica Peruana (PE), ILLA (PE), IEC (PE), MINSA (PE), CONAM (PE), CONCORTV (PE), IDL (PE), IUCM, Mesa de Comunicadores de Agencias de Cooperación, FELAFACS (LA), OCLAC (LA), OPS (LA), ANDI (LA), ALER (LA), AMARC (LA), Observatorio de Imprensa (LA), World Bank (I), AVINA (I), Broederlijk Delen (I), CAMECO (I), Communication for Social Change Consortium (I), FAO (I), Iniciativa de la Comunicación (I), ONU (I), OXFAM (I), UNICEF (I), USAID (I), WACC (I).
