= Tahmineh Monzavi =

Iranian photographer

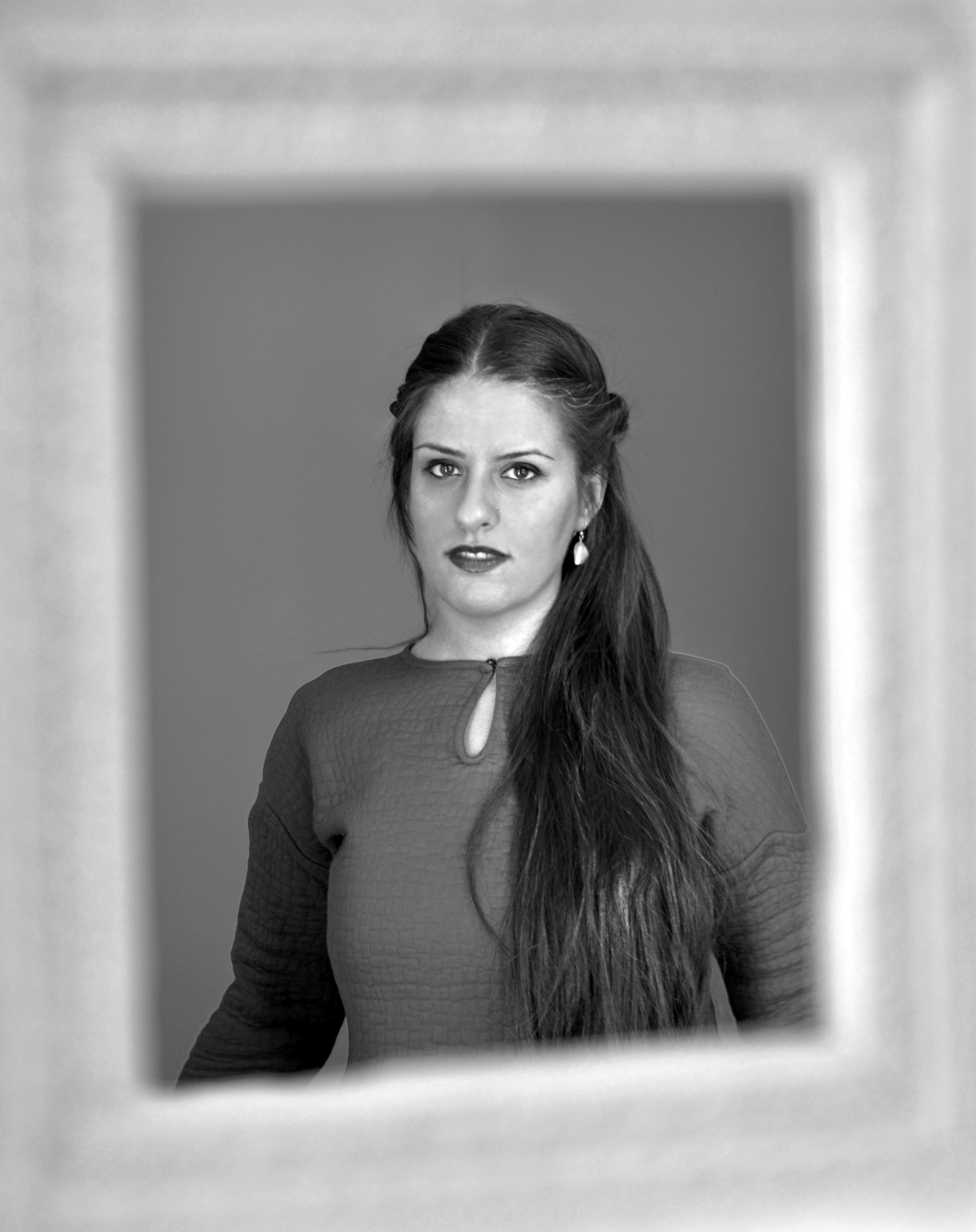
Tahmineh Monzavi in Tehran, Iran .

Tahmineh Monzavi (Persian: تهمینه منزوی) is an Iranian photographer. Her works have been exhibited in museums in several countries, and published by international art magazines and books. She received the Sheed Award in 2011.

== Biography ==
Monzavi received a bachelor's degree in photography from Azad Art & Architecture University of Tehran. In 2005, she began her professional career as a documentary photographer, with a focus on social issues. In 2009, she made a long documentary film about a group of addicted women who live in a shelter in south of Tehran. She follows the younger generation of Iranian society to document the social conflicts among them.

In 2011 she received the prestigious Sheed Award, an independent, non-profit, private photography award. This award is given to a social documentary photographer each year, and is the only Iranian photography competition to have internationally qualified members.

Her works have also been published in several international art magazines and books such as Internazionale, the British Journal of Photography, Le Figaro, L'oeil de la photographie, Alternatives History, La photographie Iranienne, and the exhibition Iran unedited history 1960-2014 published by Muse D'Art Moderne de la ville de Paris.

Her photographs have also been exhibited in several museums around the world, such as the Modern Art Museum of the City of Paris, and the Literature museum of Georgia. In the series called "The brides of Mokhber alDowleh," Monzavi told the story of works of art done by a group of men. This series has been shown in Silkroad art Gallery in Tehran, as well as in Paris, Rome, Vienna, Boston and South Korea. She has also done a project on Transsexualism, which addresses how a minority within traditional Iranian society yearns for and attempts to find wider social acceptance and recognition. Monzavi's vision was changed after a month of being imprisoned; she began looking at Iranian society differently. After a year of inactivity, she began to work on a project called "All about me; nicknamed Queen maker" in which she covers deep feelings of womanhood and womanly dreams.

Tahmineh Monzavi is also known for the length of her projects. Since the beginning of her career, she has worked on her subject matters over a long period of time. She believes the time gives her the opportunity to observe the details of a topic, and time to evaluate what happens around the subject matter. She is currently working on a long interval project of photo stories about the younger generation and women of Iran, as well as in various cities in Afghanistan.

== Solo and group exhibitions ==
- Solo Exhibition "All about me, Nicknamed Crown Giver" at The festival “Cuore di Persia” (Heart of Persia, June 28-July 10)in Bologna- Italy
- Solo Exhibition "All about me, Nicknamed Crown Giver" at The Public House of Art in Amsterdam- Netherlands . May & June 2016
- Farkhunda Series in Third Documentary Photography Days in Istanbul/Turkey . May 2016
- Chouftouhonna Festival at the cultural center Mad'Art, in Tunis, Tunisia. May 2016
- Art Paris Art fair: "All about me, Nicknamed Crown Giver" series . France -Paris .April 2016
- participating in CATAWIKI Auction in Amsterdam-Neatherland (Afghanistan series) in February 2016.
- Paris photo 2015: The Group show of contemporary Iranian photographers, with some present at the fair – Alireza Fani, Gohar Dashty, Bahman Jalali, Tahmineh Monzavi along with: Gordon Parks, Irving Penn, Sebastiao Salgado, Francesca Woodman, Mario Giacomelli and many others.
- All about Me, Nicknamed Queen Maker 1 & 2 are two videos by Tahmineh Monzavi that played next to works of such masters such as Francisco Goya, Honoré Daumier, Jean Dubuffet, Hermann Nitsch, James Nachtwey in To Create Is to Resist. The pieces presented are from the collections of the Art Rental and heritage funds of the Municipal Library of Lyon. October- January 2016
- Group Exhibition "All about me, Nicknamed Crown Giver" & "Afghanistan series" in Unseen Art Fair, Amsterdam, Netherlands. September 2015
- Photo london Art Fair, May 2015
- Solo Exhibition "All about me, Nicknamed Crown Giver" in Silkroad Art Gallery, Tehran, May–June 2015
- Group exhibition in Museum (Gijón) in Spain April - June 2015
- Solo Exhibition "Review of Tahmineh Monzavis's Artworks" in Robert Klein Gallery, Boston, February 2015
- Group Exhibition "All about me, Nicknamed Queen Maker series" in Francis Boeske Projects Gallery, Amsterdam, January 2015
- Group Exhibition "Unedited History. Iran 1960-2014" in MAXXI Museum, Rome, December 2014
- Group Exhibition "Mokhber al-dowleh's Brides series" my private world. Works from the Collection SAMMLUNG VERBUND

Vito Acconci, Cecil Beaton, Tom Burr, Gilbert & George, Symrin Gill, Nan Goldin, Peter Hujar, Louise Lawler, Urs Lüthi, Tahmineh Monzavi, Adam Rzepecki, Jeff Wall, Gillian Wearing, James Welling in Sammlung Verbund Gallery, Vienna, November 2014 - March 2015

- Group Exhibition "All about me, Nicknamed Queen Maker series" in Hinterland Gallery, Vienna, November 2014
- Group Exhibition "Mokhber al-dowleh's Brides series" in Paris Photo, Paris, November 2014
- 10th Guangju Biennale, South Korea, September 2014
- Solo Exhibition "Mokhber al-Dowleh's Brides series" in Silkroad Art Gallery, Tehran, May–June 2014
- Group Exhibition "Unedited History. Iran 1960-2014" in Modern Art Museum of Paris, Paris, May–August 2014
- Group Exhibition "Mokhber al-dowleh's Brides series" in Milles Gallery, Sydney, April 2014
- " Grape garden", 77 minutes documentary film, 2009–2013
- Group Exhibition in Side by Side Gallery, Germany, December 2013
- Collected a Group Exhibition "A view of documentary photography in Iran 1987-2013" in Silkroad art Gallery, Tehran, October 2013
- Group Exhibition "Dance of the veil" in Side by Side Gallery, Germany, October 2013
- Video Art "OXYS in black and white" showed in theater hall with art perform dancers in Athens, Milan and Syros, October 2013
- Group Exhibition " Grape Garden", Tbilisi Nights of Photography in literature Museum, Georgia, July 2012
- Won the first prize in "SHEED AWARD" (independent annual documentary award), Sheed is the only award which hold with Iranian and international jury, Tehran, November 2011
- Group Exhibition in SOAS University "High Fashion" Curated by Malu Halasa, December 2011
- Group Exhibition in National Portrait Gallery curated by Malu Halasa, London, December 2011
- Won the first prize from "The Artist's home" for "the addiction and city life" competition, Tehran, January 2011
- Group Exhibition, "A selection of young talented Iranian photographers" in Silkroad Gallery, Tehran, July 2011
- Group Exhibition "Tehran documented" selection of documentary photographs of last 40 years in Aran Gallery, Tehran, July 2010
- Group Exhibition "Women Defining Women in Contemporary Art of the Middle East and Beyond" Los Angeles County Museum of Art, Los Angeles, California, April 23 - September 24, 2023.
