= GMB Akash =

Bangladeshi photographer (born 1977)

- জি এম বি আকাশ
- Born: GMB Akash; 1977; Dhaka, Bangladesh
- Education: Mymensingh Zilla School
- Occupation: Photojournalist
- Years active: 1996-present
- Agent: Panos Pictures
- Known for: Documentary photography
- Notable credit(s): World Press Photo Joop Swart Master Class, The Netherlands.
- Website: www.gmb-akash.com

GMB Akash (Bengali: জি এম বি আকাশ) is a Bangladeshi documentary photographer.

== Life and work ==
GMB Akash is a Bangladeshi photographer who concentrates on people living on the edge of society around the world. His work has been featured in over 100 major publications including Vogue, Time, Sunday Times, Newsweek, Geo, Stern, Der Spiegel, The Fader, Brand Ein, The Guardian, Marie Claire. etc. The photographs of GMB Akash have been exhibited all over the world. He has received more than 100 international photography awards.

Akash works as a photographer for Panos Pictures, UK, and founded the First Light Institute of Photography in Narayanganj, Bangladesh in August, 2013.

His work has been featured in The Guardian, the London Sunday Telegraph, The Fader,

== Solo exhibitions ==
- Solo exhibition / book launch: First Light at the Bengal Gallery of Fine Arts. Dhaka, Bangladesh, 2006
- Survivors at Alliance Française de Dhaka, 2009;
- Lugano Photo Festival, Lugano, Switzerland, 2013
- Soulscapes at the Bengal Gallery of Fine Arts, Dhaka, Bangladesh, 2010;
- My Mapless world, Art-Buvette APCd Gallery, Fribourg, Switzerland, 2013

== Awards ==
- 2002, third place, Press Foundation of Asia, Bangladesh Chapter, photo contest
- 2002, World Press Photo Joop Swart Masterclass, the Netherlands
- 2004, Young Reporters Award, The Scope Photo Festival in Paris
- 2005, "Best of Show" award from the Center for Fine Art Photography, Colorado, US
- 2007, UNICEF Photos of the Year, 2nd place.
- 2009, Travel Photographer of the Year winner
- 2010, CIWEM Environmental Photographer of the Year, Quality of Life winner
- 2014, one of ten finalists in Lugano Photo Days contest, Switzerland
