= Steve Fitch =

American photographer

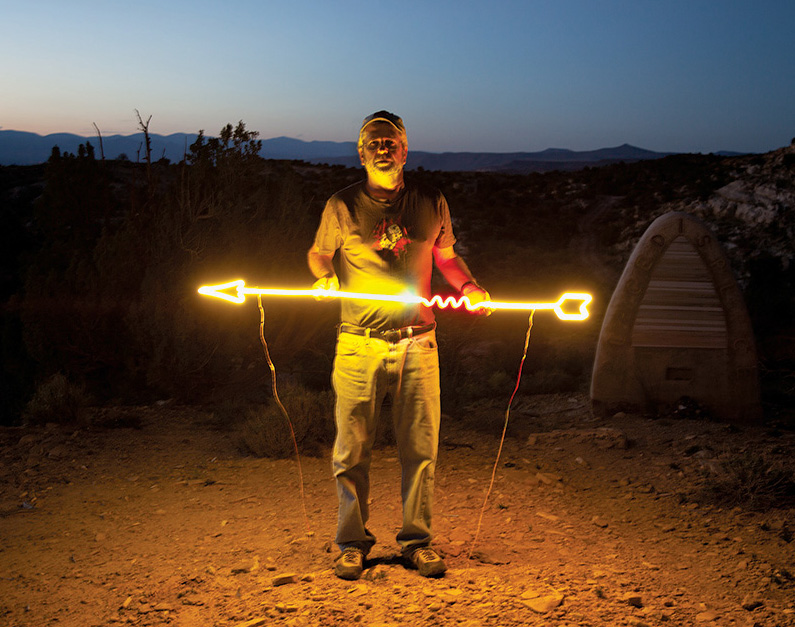
- Born: August 16, 1949 (age 77); Tucson, Arizona, United States
- Occupations: Photographer, visual artist, academic and author
- Awards: National Endowment for the Arts Fellowship in Photography

Academic background
- Education: BA; MFA
- Alma mater: University of New Mexico

Academic work
- Institutions: Santa Fe University of Art and Design

Steve Fitch is an American photographer, visual artist, academic and author. He was a Professor of Photography at the Santa Fe University of Art and Design.

Fitch's books include Diesels and Dinosaurs (1976), Marks in Place: Contemporary Responses to Rock Art (1988), Gone: Photographs of Abandonment on the High Plains (2003), Llano Estacado: Island in the Sky (2011), Motel Signs (2011), American Motel Signs 1980–2008 (2016), American Motel Signs 1980–2018 volume II, and Vanishing Vernacular: Western Landmarks (2018).

== Education ==
Fitch received his bachelor's degree in Anthropology from the University of California at Berkeley in 1971. He worked towards a masters in photography from the San Francisco Art Institute in 1977 and completed a master's degree in Fine Art Photography from the University of New Mexico in 1978.

== Career ==
Fitch taught at the University of Colorado in Boulder as a Visiting Assistant Professor in the Department of Fine Arts from 1979 until 1985. He was a Visiting Assistant Professor at the University of San Antonio in 1985 and a Lecturer in the Visual Arts Program at Princeton University from 1986 to 1990. At the Santa Fe University of Art and Design, he was a Professor of Photography in the art department from 1990 until 2013.

His work has been in several exhibits and is a part of the permanent collections at the Smithsonian American Art Museum, San Francisco Museum of Modern Art, The J. Paul Getty Museum, the Whitney Museum of American Art, the Museum of Modern Art, the Art Institute of Chicago; the Rijksmuseum, and the Multimedia Art Museum, Moscow. In 1990 he began photographing the haunted interiors of abandoned buildings on the high Great Plains.

Fitch worked on a photography project capturing the vernacular roadside of the American highway. He received two National Endowment of the Arts Fellowships, in 1973 and 1975 to help in the completion of the project. In 1981, he began work on another project for which he captured prehistoric Native American pictograph and petroglyph sites in the American West and a project that was partially funded by a National Endowment for the Arts Survey Grant. When he returned to New Mexico in 1990, he photographed the ongoing abandonment of the high Great Plains and also received the Eliot Porter Fellowship from the New Mexico Council for Photography in 1999 to aid in the completion of this project.

=== Work ===
Fitch's first project of black and white photographs was published as Diesels and Dinosaurs (1976), in which he photographed neon-lit motels and signs, truckstops and tourist spots along the highway, drive-in movie theaters mostly in the West of America, and billboards and plywood signs. In a later project, he focused on the prehistoric Native American pictograph and petroglyph sites in the Southwest and then–using an 8"x10" view camera–the abandoned homes and schools on the high Great Plains west of the 100th Meridian.

Fitch's Vanishing Vernacular series is a selection of his work, in color, which mainly focuses on features of the western roadside landscape. Christian House, a freelance arts and books writer for the Guardian and the Daily Telegraph wrote that "The American West has changed immeasurably over the past half a century. In Steve Fitch's wonderful photographic survey Vanishing Vernacular: Western Landmarks we find a fading world of the hotels, diners, radio masts and cinemas dotted along the highways. In a similar vein to the city vistas of Eugène Atget and Berenice Abbot and – in particular – the studies of cooling towers by Bernd and Hiller Becher, Fitch produces a moving paean to the landmarks of yesteryear." According to Aida Amer at Atlas Obscura, "Steve Fitch, who refers to himself as a visual folklorist, has documented the changing landscape of the American West since the mid-1970s. His new photo book, Vanishing Vernacular: Western Landmarks, is a striking visual commentary on how these once ubiquitous signs—alongside thousand-year-old petroglyphs, small-town murals, and drive-in theaters—are becoming part of the collective memory of the West."

In a series American Motel Signs, Fitch took photos of advertisements and colorful signage across the United States. American Motel Signs II is the sequel to the 2016 book. In a project called Marks and Measures, he worked with four other photographers taking pictures of prehistoric Native American pictograph and petroglyph sites which resulted in the book Marks in Place: Contemporary Responses to Rock Art (1988) published by the University of New Mexico Press. His photography of the ongoing abandonment of the high Great Plains resulted in the book of photographs entitled Gone: Photographs of Abandonment on the High Plains (2003), after which a traveling exhibition was organized by the University of New Mexico Art Museum. The Smithsonian American Art Museum in Washington purchased a selection of forty photographs from the series. His work in Llano Estacado: Island in the Sky, Texas Tech University Press, 2011 consisted of 10 photographs in color and 1 essay.

Hal Fischer in Artforum magazine in 1980 stated that "Fitch is a romantic, but his handling of subject resides somewhere between Pop rendition and a painterly, amorphous abstraction. Commonplace artifacts are seen as iconic forms, resilient symbols of mass culture. At his best, Fitch offers a Kerouacian vision—a solitary Western America deliriously glimpsed from a speeding car in the middle of the night. His synthetic depictions are expressionistic but measured, the West simultaneously understood as reality and myth."

== Personal life ==
Steve Fitch lives in rural Santa Fe County, New Mexico in a passive solar, adobe house that he built with his wife, Lynn Grimes, an artist and educator.

== Selected exhibitions ==
- "The New West, An Old Story: Photographs by Joan Myers and Steve Fitch", Turchin Center for the Visual Arts, Appalachian State University, Boone, North Carolina, 2022
- "Steve Fitch Photographs", Galerie Wouter van Leeuwen, Amsterdam, the Netherlands, 2021
- "Steve Fitch: Vanishing Vernacular", Kopeikin Gallery, Los Angeles, California, 2018
- "Steve Fitch: Western Landmarks and American Motel Signs", Galerie Wouter van Leeuwen, Amsterdam, Netherlands, 2017
- "Modern Times: Photography in the 20th Century", Rijksmuseum, Amsterdam, Netherlands, 2014 to 2015
- Landscapes in Passing: Steve Fitch, Robert Flick, Elaine Mayes, Smithsonian American Art Museum, Washington, DC, 2013 to 2014
- "American Landscapes: Contemporary Photographs of the West", Joslyn Art Museums, Omaha, Nebraska, 2011–12
- "Inaugural Photography Exhibition in the new Modern Wing", Chicago Art Institute, 2009
- "Steve Fitch: Recipient of the 1999 Eliot Porter Fellowship", Museum of Fine Arts, Santa Fe, NM, 2000
- "STEVE FITCH: Diesels and Dinosaurs and Beyond", Paul Kopeikin Gallery, Los Angeles, CA, 1997
- "Marks and Measures: Linda Connor, Rick Dingus, Steve Fitch, Charles Roitz", Spencer Art Museum, University of Kansas, Lawrence, KS, 1985

== Awards and honors ==
- 1973 – National Endowment for the Arts Fellowship in Photography
- 1975 – National Endowment for the Arts Fellowship in Photography
- 1981 – Eliot Porter Fellowship, New Mexico Council for Photography, 1999 National Endowment for the Arts Fellowship: "Marks and Measures" survey grant
- 1981 – National Endowment for the Arts Fellowship: "Marks and Measures" survey grant

== Bibliography ==
=== Books ===
- American Motel Signs, volume 2 (2020) ISBN 9781908889768
- Vanishing Vernacular (2018) ISBN 9781938086601
- American Motel Signs (2016) ISBN 9781908889379
- Modern Times Photography in the 20th Century (2014)
- Route 66: Iconography of the American Highway (2014)
- Llano Estacado: Island in the Sky (2011)
- Gone: Photographs of Abandonment on the High Plains (2003) ISBN 9780826329608
- Marks in Place: Contemporary Responses to Rock Art (1988) ISBN 9780826309761
- Diesels and Dinosaurs (1976) Library of Congress Catalog Card #76-20064
