= Chloe Dewe Mathews =

British documentary photographer (born 1982)

Chloe Joan Dewe Mathews (born 1982) is an English documentary photographer based in St Leonards-on-Sea. She is "best known for ambitious documentary projects that can take years of preparation." Dewe Mathews has said "I am exploring ways in which to project the past on to the present".

Her series Shot at Dawn records sites where British, French and Belgian soldiers were executed for cowardice or desertion during the first world war. It was published as a book in 2014 and exhibited at Tate Modern and at the Irish Museum of Modern Art. In Search of Frankenstein was exhibited at the British Library in 2018.

Dewe Mathews' work is held in the collections of the British Council, Herbert Art Gallery and Museum and Sheffield Galleries and Museums Trust.

== Life and work ==
Dewe Mathews was born in 1982 and grew up near Hammersmith Bridge along the riverside. She studied fine art at the Ruskin School of Drawing and Fine Art, Oxford.

For her series Caspian, she walked around the Caspian Sea, through Azerbaijan, Iran, Kazakhstan, Russia, and Turkmenistan.

Her series Shot at Dawn records many of the sites across France and Belgium where around 1000 British, French and Belgian soldiers were executed for cowardice or desertion during the first world war. She photographed each site at dawn, the time that most of the men were executed; close to the date on which they occurred; and from around the same vantage that they were shot. It was commissioned by the Ruskin School of Art at the University of Oxford as part of a commemorative art series, published as a book in 2014 and exhibited in various places.

Dewe Mathews completed an artist's residency at the Verbier 3-D Foundation, Bagnes, Switzerland in 2016 on the topic of the so-called Year Without a Summer, a period of severe climate deterioration. This provided the backdrop for Mary Shelley when writing Frankenstein (1818) whilst staying in the same area. Dewe Mathews' series made there, In Search of Frankenstein, is concerned with contemporary environmental and social issues via the themes of Shelley's novel.

She spent five years making Thames Log, a series about the variety of peoples' relationship with the River Thames.

== Publications ==
=== Publications by Dewe Mathews ===
- Shot at Dawn. Madrid: Ivorypress, 2014. ISBN 9788494146275. With texts by Geoff Dyer, Hew Strachan, Helen McCarthy and Paul Bonaventura.
- Sunday Service. Tate Modern and You. London: Tate, 2014. With texts by Synthia Griffin and Phil Stokes.
- In Search of Frankenstein – Mary Shelley's Nightmare. Baden, Switzerland: Kodoji, 2018. ISBN 9783037470916. Dewe Mathews' photographs with reproductions of The Geneva Notebook, the first half of Mary Shelley's original manuscript for Frankenstein.
- Caspian: The Elements. New York City: Aperture; Cambridge, MA: Peabody Museum Press, 2018. ISBN 978-1-59711-444-8. With essays by Morad Montazami, Sean O'Hagan and Arnold van Bruggen.
- Thames Log. London: Loose Joints; Bristol: Martin Parr Foundation, 2021. ISBN 978-1-912719-19-8. With a text by Marina Warner.

=== Publications with contributions by Dewe Mathews ===
- Conflict: Time: Photography. London: Tate, 2014. ISBN 978-1-84976-320-2. Edited by Simon Baker and Shoair Mavlian. Exhibition Catalogue.

== Exhibitions ==
=== Solo exhibitions ===
- Sunday Service, Tate Modern, London, 2014.
- Shot at Dawn, Stills, Edinburgh, 2014; Irish Museum of Modern Art, Dublin, 2015–2016; Ivorypress, Madrid, 2016.
- Congregation, Bosse & Baum, London, 2015.
- In Search of Frankenstein, British Library, London, 2018.
- Caspian: The Elements, Peabody Museum Harvard, Boston, 2019
- Tjames Log, Martin Parr Foundation, Bristol, 2021

=== Significant group exhibitions ===
- Conflict, Time, Photography, Tate Modern, London, 2014–2015. Included Shot at Dawn.

== Awards ==
- 2011: British Journal of Photography International Photography Award
- 2014: Robert Gardner Fellow in Photography at the Peabody Museum of Archaeology and Ethnology, Harvard University
- 2016: Vic Odden Award, Royal Photographic Society, Bath, UK

== Collections ==
Dewe Mathews' work is held in the following permanent public collections:

- British Council Collection: 4 prints from Shot at Dawn (as of 25 April 2018)
- Herbert Art Gallery and Museum (acquired with assistance from Art Fund): 2 prints from Shot at Dawn (as of 25 April 2018)
- Graves Art Gallery, Sheffield Galleries and Museums Trust (acquired with assistance from the Contemporary Art Society): 3 prints from Shot at Dawn (as of 25 April 2018)
