= Hossein Fatemi (psychiatrist) =

Iranian-American psychiatrist

S. Hossein Fatemi
- Known for: Research on schizophrenia and mood disorders, effects of reelin
- Scientific career
- Fields: Psychiatry, Neuroscience
- Workplaces: University of Minnesota

S. Hossein Fatemi is an American-Iranian psychiatrist and neuroscientist, professor of psychiatry at the University of Minnesota.

== Education ==
Fatemi completed a B.S. in biology at Baylor University. He completed a M.S. and a Ph.D. in Human Anatomy and Cell Biology at the University of Nebraska Medical Center in 1976, and 1979 respectively. Subsequently, he did postdoctoral fellowships at the University of Texas School of Medicine at Houston, Department of Pharmacology; the University of Texas, Cyclic Nucleotide Labs; McGill University and the National Institutes of Health (NIH). He received his M.D. from Case Western Reserve University in 1991. He completed medical school training and graduated with honors in psychiatry. Subsequently, he joined the psychiatry department at Case Western Reserve University and completed a residency at University Hospitals of Cleveland (1992–1996).

== Career ==
Prior to his medical education, Fatemi was an assistant professor of anatomy at McGill University and subsequently, faculty at the Institutes of Pathology, at Case Western Reserve University. Following completion of his residency program, Fatemi was appointed associate professor of psychiatry, cell biology and neuroanatomy at University of Minnesota Medical School, in July 1996. Subsequently, he was promoted to full professor of psychiatry and of neuroscience in 2006. He is currently the Bernstein Endowed Chair in Adult Psychiatry at the University of Minnesota.

== Scientific research ==
Fatemi's research over his career has led to several discoveries, including identification of the mechanism of glycophospholipid anchoring of THY-1 protein, neurodevelopmental mechanisms of brain structure and function in major psychiatric disorders, development of a viral model of brain disorder in schizophrenia and autism, and finally involvement of Reelin abnormalities in psychiatric disorders.

== Bibliography ==
Fatemi has published several books:

- Neuropsychiatric Disorders and Infection (2005),
- The Medical Basis of Psychiatry, Third Edition (2008),
- Reelin Glycoprotein: Structure, Biology and Roles in Health and Disease (2008) (as editor)
- The Molecular Basis of Autism (2015),
- The Medical Basis of Psychiatry, Fourth Edition (2016).
