= Martin Roemers =

Dutch photographer and artist

Martin Roemers (born August 21, 1962, in Oldehove, Netherlands) is a Dutch photographer and artist. Roemers studied at the AKI Academy of Visual Arts in Enschede, the Netherlands. He graduated in 1991.

== Trabant ==
His first long-term project was Trabant. The Final Days of Production (1990–1992). Roemers, still being a student, photographed the production process of the Trabant car and made portraits of the Trabant workers. The book and exhibition of this project followed years later in 2007.

== Warfare project ==
Roemers opted for the black-and-white portrait in his photo projects on the long-term effects of warfare. This resulted in three books and exhibitions:

- Kabul (2002): Portraits of ISAF soldiers in Kabul, Afghanistan photographed with an antique Afghan box camera.
- The Never-Ending War (2004–2005): World War Two veterans from Russia, Germany, USA, UK, Poland, Belgium and the Netherlands. The series received a World Press Photo award in 2006.
- The Eyes of War (2007–2012): Blind victims of World War Two. For this project, he made portraits of dozens of people who had lost their eyesight as children, young adults or soldiers in the violence of WW2.

== Relics of the Cold War ==
In his book Relics of the Cold War (1998–2009) Roemers traced Cold War relics in former Eastern and Western Europe and then photographed them in situ. This generated a collection of images of tunnels, rusting tanks and abandoned nuclear missile launch pads.

== Metropolis ==
In Metropolis (2007–2015) Roemers photographed 22 megacities worldwide. Roemers presents these (analog) cityscapes from an elevated perspective and uses a long exposure time in which traffic and people merge into a blurred rush of energy.

Metropolis features Beijing, Buenos Aires, Cairo, Dhaka, Guangzhou, Istanbul, Jakarta, Karachi, Kolkata, Lagos, London, Los Angeles, Manila, Mexico City, Moscow, Mumbai, New York, Paris, Rio de Janeiro, São Paulo, Shanghai and Tokyo.

== Exhibits and recognition ==
Roemers’ work has been exhibited throughout Europe, America, Asia and Australia. It is represented in Amsterdam's Rijksmuseum(60 prints) and The Museum of Fine Arts in Houston.

Roemers received two World Press Photo Awards, including a first prize for Metropolis, along with a number of other prizes.

== Books (Monographs) ==
- Martin Roemers, De laatste lichting – The Last Batch, Het Apollohuis (Eindhoven, 1996). Introductions by Rolf Sachsse, Herman Amersfoort, ISBN 9789071638329
- Martin Roemers, Tussen vijandige Buren, Mets & Schilt Publishers (Amsterdam, 2000) Introduction by Henri Beunders, ISBN 90-5330-289-1
- Martin Roemers, Kabul, Legermuseum (Delft, 2003), Introduction by Frits Baarda, ISBN 90-6116-017-0
- Martin Roemers, The Never-Ending War – De eindeloze oorlog, QV Publishers (Nijmegen, 2005). Introduction by H.J.A. Hofland, Interviews by Martin Roemers, ISBN 90-80974-013
- Martin Roemers, Trabant; The Final Days of Production – Trabant; Die letzten Tage der Produktion, Wasmuth Verlag (Berlin, 2007), Introductions by Winnfried Sonntag, Achim Dresler, Kerstin Schwenn, ISBN 978-3-8030-3324-6
- Martin Roemers, Relics of the Cold War, Hatje Cantz (Ostfildern, 2009), Introductions by Nadine Barth, H.J.A. Hofland, Martin Roemers, ISBN 978-3-7757-2534-7
- Martin Roemers, The Eyes of War, Hatje Cantz (Ostfildern, 2012), Introductions by Cees Nooteboom, Martin Roemers, Interviews by Martin Roemers, ISBN 978-3-7757-3400-4
- Martin Roemers, Metropolis, Hatje Cantz (Ostfildern, 2015) Introductions by Ricky Burdett, Azu Nwagbogu, Els Barents, ISBN 978-3-7757-4006-7

== Books with contributions by Roemers ==
- Document Nederland, Rijksmuseum (Amsterdam, 2005), ISBN 90 40090602
- Traces & Omens, Noorderlicht (Groningen, 2005), ISBN 90 76703 26 4
- Warzone, Noorderlicht (Groningen, 2010), ISBN 978 90 76703 44 2
- Metropolis – City Life in the Urban Age, Noorderlicht (Groningen, 2011), ISBN 978 90 76703 46 6
- Visions of Earth, National Geographic (Washington, 2011), ISBN 978 1 4262 0935 2
- Growth, Prix Pictet, teNeues (Kempen, 2011), ISBN 978 3 8327 9454 5
- Modern Times, Rijksmuseum (Amsterdam 2014), ISBN 978 94 6208 179 6
- Mexico Megalopolis, Lannoo (Tielt, 2016), ISBN 978 9401434782

== Permanent Collections ==
- – Rijksmuseum, Amsterdam, the Netherlands
- – Huis Marseille – Museum for Photography, Amsterdam, the Netherlands
- – Kunsthal, Rotterdam, The Netherlands
- – Ministry of Foreign Affairs, Art Collection, The Hague, The Netherlands
- – Nationaal Militair Museum, Soesterberg, The Netherlands
- – Haus der Geschichte der Bundesrepublik Deutschland, Bonn, Germany
- – German Historical Museum (DHM), Berlin, Germany
- – Industriemuseum Sachsen, Chemnitz, Germany
- – Stadtmuseum Berlin, Berlin, Germany
- – Ford Foundation, New York City
- – The Museum of Fine Arts Houston, Houston, USA

== Solo exhibitions ==
- 2001 Noorderlicht Photogallery, Groningen, The Netherlands, Tussen vijandige buren
- 2003 Legermuseum, Delft, The Netherlands, Kabul
- 2007 Kunsthal Rotterdam, Rotterdam, The Netherlands, The Never-Ending War
- 2009 Kunsthal Rotterdam, Rotterdam, The Netherlands, A tribute to the Trabant
- 2009 – 2010 Willy Brandt Haus, Berlin, Germany, Relics of the Cold War
- 2009 – 2010 Deutsches Museum, Munich, Germany, Trabant: The Final Days of Production
- 2010 Krasnoyarsk Museum Center, Krasnoyarsk, Siberia, Russia, Relics of the Cold War
- 2012 Kunsthal, Rotterdam, The Netherlands, The Eyes of War
- 2012 Anastasia Photo, New York City, Metropolis (Work in Progress)
- 2014 Anastasia Photo, New York City, Relics of the Cold War
- 2014 – 2015 German Historical Museum (DHM), Berlin, The Eyes of War
- 2015 Arsenal, Nizhny Novgorod, Russia, The Eyes of War
- 2015 – 2016 Huis Marseille – Museum for Photography, Amsterdam, the Netherlands, Metropolis
- 2016 East Wing, Dubai, Metropolis
- 2016 German Historical Museum (DHM), Berlin, Relics of the Cold War
- 2016 Torch Gallery, Amsterdam, Metropolis
- 2016 Dr. Bhau Daji Lad Mumbai City Museum, Mumbai, India, Metropolis

== Group exhibitions ==
- 2002 The Netherlands Photo Institute, Rotterdam, The Netherlands, Brandhaarden – Warzone
- 2004 State Museum of the Political History of Russia, St. Petersburg, Russia, Warzone – Dutch Photographers and International Conflicts
- 2005 Noorderlicht Photofestival, Groningen, The Netherlands, Traces & Omens
- 2006 Customs House, Sydney, Australia, Dutch Decade: Photography from The Netherlands
- 2007 – 2008 Willy-Brandt-Haus, Berlin, Germany, Arbeit und Alltag 1951–1992: Fotografien von Roger Melis, Martin Roemers und Walter Vogel
- 2009 – 2010 Ephraim-Palais, Stadtmuseum Berlin, Berlin, Germany, Fallmauerfall | 61 – 89 – 09 Grenzueberschreitung und Grenzerfahrung im Spiegel der Kunst
- 2010 Duke University, Center for Documentary Studies, Durham USA, Daylight/CDS Photo Awards
- 2010 Photofestival Bredaphoto, Breda, The Netherlands, Tilt
- 2010 Noorderlicht Photofestival, Leeuwarden, The Netherlands, Warzone
- 2011 Museum of Estonian Architecture, Tallinn, Estonia, Metropolis – City Life in the Urban Age
- 2011 The Empty Quarter, Dubai, Metropolis 2.0
- 2011 Noorderlicht Photofestival, Groningen, The Netherlands, Metropolis
- 2011 Sony World Photography Festival 2011, London, San Francisco, Shanghai, São Paulo
- 2011 Gemeente Museum Den Haag, The Hague, The Netherlands, Summer Exhibition
- 2011 Photofestival Naarden, Naarden, The Netherlands, Let's face it
- 2012 Photoville, Brooklyn, New York
- 2013 Paris Photo, Paris
- 2013 Photoville, New York City
- 2013 Somerset House, Syngenta Photography Award 2013, London
- 2013 ART Rotterdam, Rotterdam, The Netherlands
- 2015 Acte2 Galerie, Paris, Urban Dreams
- 2016 Biennial of Photography, Knokke-Heist, Belgium, Mexico Megalopolis

== Awards ==
2006 World Press Photo, 2nd prize Portraits Stories The Never-Ending War

- 2009 European Prize of Architectural Photography, Commendation Metropolis
- 2010 Photo District News, USA, Notable Photo Books of 2010 Relics of the Cold War
- 2010 Daylight/ CDS Photo Awards, USA, Project Prize: Honorable Mention Relics of the Cold War
- 2010 Daylight/ CDS Photo Awards, USA, Work-in-Process Prize: Juror Pick Metropolis
- 2011 World Press Photo, 1st prize Daily Life Stories Metropolis
- 2011 Sony World Photography Awards, Nomination The Eyes of War
- 2013 Deutscher Fotobuchpreis, Nomination The Eyes of War

== Bibliography ==
- Eyemazing (NL), Martin Roemers, The Never-Ending War – Tyler Whisnand, No. 8, 2005
- Foto8 (UK), Relics – Jon Levy, March 2006
- Der Spiegel (DE), Bunkermentalitaet, No. 51, 2009
- The Wall Street Journal (US), The Little Car That Could (Sort Of): a Trabant Tribute – J.S. Marcus, April 24, 2009
- Photo District News (US), Notable Photo Books of 2010, Nov. 2010
- Newsweek (US), Hello, Seven Billion – Martin Roemers, November 7, 2011
- The Guardian Weekend (UK), Kolkata by Martin Roemers – Phil Daoust, May 21, 2011
- The Wall Street Journal (US), The Beauty and Brutality of Images That Reach Far Beyond the Headlines – Joell Weickgenant, May 13, 2011
- The New Yorker (US), Goings on About Town – Martin Roemers, April 2, 2012
- The New York Photo Review (US), Urban Speed – Ed Barnas, April 18, 2012
- The New York Times (US), Sunday Review. Living in The New Metropolis – Martin Roemers, May 6, 2012
- The New York Times (US), The Bustle and the Blur – Liz Robbins, July 28, 2013
- The Wall Street Journal (US), Collector's Eye: Anthony Terrana. A Periodontist's Photographic Passion – Ellen Gamerman, March 30, 2013
- Frankfurter Allgemeine Zeitung (DE), Blinde Blicke – Andreas Kilb, October 6, 2014
- Geo (DE), Der Rhytmus in Metropolis – Juergen Schaeffer, Sept. 2014
- Collector Daily (US), Martin Roemers, Relics of the Cold War @Anastasia Photo – Loring Knoblauch July 30, 2014
- European Photography (DE), Urbanics – The Contemporary City – Andreas Mueller Pohle, #98, 2015
- Cees Nooteboom – Wat het oog je vertelt. Essay: Het onzichtbare gezien: over het werk van
- Frankfurter Allgemeine Zeitung (DE), Wahnbilder einer versunkenen Epoche – Andreas Kilb, March 14, 2016
- Geo (FR), Marées urbaines – Jean Christoph Servant, Feb. 2016
- NRC Handelsblad (NL), Metropolis: chaos megasteden voelbaar – Tracy Metz, January 19, 2016
- The New Review, The Independent on Sunday (UK), Roadshow – Rachael Pells, January 10, 2016
- Photonews (DE), Der Fotograf Martin Roemers – Gunda Schwantje, Jan. 2016
- Martin Roemers, De Bezige Bij (Amsterdam, 2016), ISBN 9789023498131
