= Hossein Fatemi (photographer) =

Iranian photographer (born 1980)

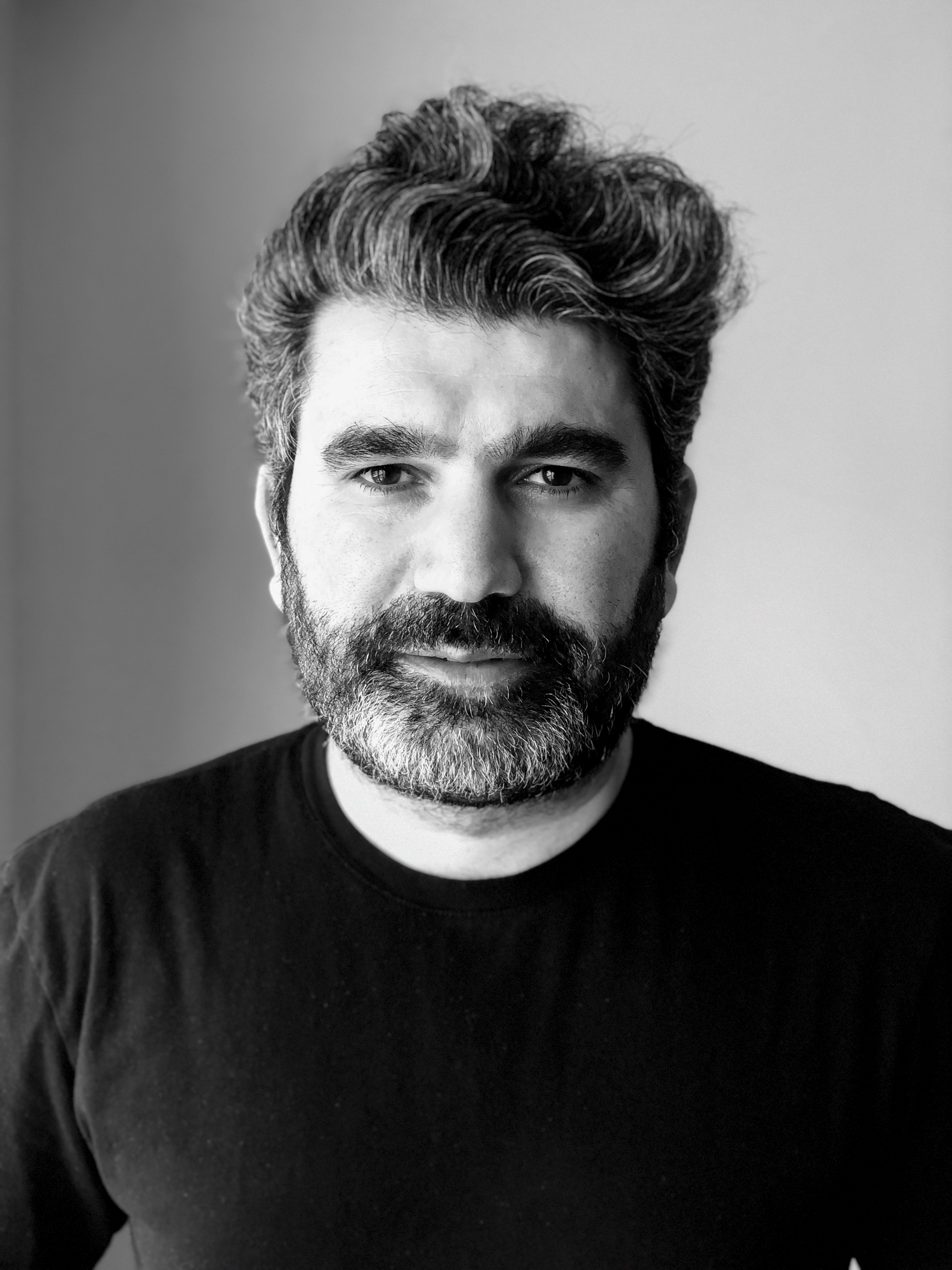
- Hossein Fatemi in 2021 (photo by Kia Adl)
- Born: 1980 (age 45–46); Iran, Ardabil
- Occupation: Photojournalist
- Years active: 1997-present
- Agent: Panos Pictures
- Notable work: Afghanistan: A Troubled Legacy (2012); Veiled Truths (2014); Shaq Loves People at Expo Chicago (2014); Midwest Photographers Project (2016)
- Website: www.hosseinfatemi.me

Hossein Fatemi (born 1980, Ardabil, Iran) is an Iranian photojournalist. He received the 2nd place World Press Photo Award in 2017, and the Picture of the Year International (POYi) in 2016 and 2014 in two categories. He is a member of Panos Pictures since 2010.

== Early life ==
Hossein began his journey as a photojournalist covering politics and social events in his native Iran at the age of 17. Between 2006 and 2008 he covered the wars in Lebanon and Georgia respectively and in 2009 he moved to Afghanistan where he documented the American ground operation and the lives of ordinary Afghans in the aftermath of years of constant war.

Hossein's work has been exhibited widely and his travels have taken him around the world including: Pakistan, Armenia, Turkey, Iraq, Russia, India, Somalia, Kenya and Bangladesh. He has won a World Press Photo Award for his long-term work on Iran, numerous awards at the China International Press Photo Contest (CHIPP), the Pictures of the Year International (POYi) and the DAYS Japan International Photojournalism Awards.

He currently lives in New York covering human rights, social, environmental and political issues. His photographs have been published in numerous national and international journals including Newsweek, New York Times, Time, The Guardian, and Washington Post. The documentary Exposed is in production by Hassan Khademi covering his life story as an Iranian photojournalist.

== Woman Life Freedom ==
During the 2022-2023 protests sparked by the tragic death of Mahsa "Jina" Amini, a 22-year-old Kurdish woman arrested by the Islamic Republic's morality police, Hossein provided crucial support to Iranian photographers documenting the unrest. With the support of Iranians of all ages, genders, and ethnicities, the protests spread from Amini's hometown of Saqqez throughout the country. It responded by disrupting internet access, intimidating journalists, and violently suppressing the uprisings. As hospitals are controlled by the regime, anyone injured during the protests risks arrest and further abuse when seeking medical treatment.

As part of a project titled "Woman, Life, Freedom," Hossein's team captured images and video of the nurse as well as local photojournalists assigned to cover her story during this volatile time. This project was recognized in the 2023 Asia Photo Contest, Open Format World Press Photographers. As a result of security concerns, the photographers who captured these poignant images chose to remain anonymous. Hossein is only identified as the Story Executive Producer of the team.

== Awards ==
- World Press Photo, 2023 Photo Contest, ASIA, Open Format
- World Press Photo, 2nd Place Long Term Project, 2017
- China International Photojournalism Contest, Silver Medal, 2017
- Picture of the Year International (POYi), World Understanding Award, 2016
- FotoEvidence, Book Awards, 2015
- Picture of the Year International (POYi), Portrait Series, 3rd Place, 2014
- Picture of the Year International (POYi), Award of Excellence, 2014
- LensCulture, Portrait Awards, 2nd Prize, 2014
- Days Japan International Photojournalism Awards, 2013
- Art of Photography Show, USA, Grant Recipient, 2013
- UNICEF Photo of the Year, Award, Honorable Mention, 2012
- Awakening World Awards, Grand Prize, Iran, 2012
- China International Photojournalism Contest, Gold Medal, 2011
- China International Photojournalism Contest 2007
- China International Photojournalism Contest 2009

== Exhibitions ==
- 2020: Standoff at Standing Rock: BursaPhotoFest, Istanbul
- 2017: Beyond the Ban: Contemporary Iranian Art, group exhibition, Susal Eley Gallery, New York
- 2016: Veiled Truths Series Exhibition, Elizabeth Houston Gallery, New York
- 2016: An Iranian Journey, Museum of Contemporary Photography, Chicago
- 2014: Under the Surface: A photographic portrait of the Middle East, Th!nkArt, Chicago
- 2016 :Afghanistan: A Troubled Legacy, LUMIX Photo Festival in Hannover, Germany
- 2014 : An Iranian Journey, LUMIX Photo Festival in Hannover, Germany
- 2014: Veiled Truths Series, part of group exhibition, EXPO Chicago, Chicago
- 2013: Afghanistan: A Troubled Legacy: Chobi Mela VI, Dhaka

== Experience ==
- Middle East Images Agency - 2018–Present
- Panos Pictures – 2010–Present
- Associated Press (AP) – 2010 - 2011
- United Press International (UPI) – 2009 - 2010
- Fars News Agency – 2003- 2008

== Publications ==
- Fatemi, Hossein. "The Iranians Who Can't (or Won't) Go Home Again". Foreign Policy.
- Fatemi, Hossein (23 September 2016). "Photo Series: Americans and Their Firearms". Spiegel Online Germany.
- Fatemi, Hossein (28 March 2014). "Opinion | Veiled Truths". New York Times.
- Fatemi, Hossein (3 April 2014). "Jeunesses iraniennes, jeunesses interdites". Slate.fr.
- Fatemi, Hossein (16 May 2018). "What you need to know before traveling to Armenia". Explore Parts Unknown.
- Fatemi, Hossein (28 December 2013). "In The Mud For Love • PRIVATE - photographers and writers". PRIVATE - photographers and writers.
