= Communication for Development =

Communication model

Communication for Development (C4D) is all the different types of communication that need to take place in societies if sustainable democratic development is to occur.

The approach to Communication for Development (C4D) has evolved over the years. Initially developed after World War II as a tool for diffusion of ideas, communication initiatives primarily involved a one-way transmission of information from the sender to the receiver. This includes large-scale media campaigns, social marketing, dissemination of printed materials, and 'education-entertainment'. Since then, C4D has broadened to incorporate interpersonal communication: face-to-face communication that can either be one-on-one or in small groups. This came alongside the general push for more participatory approaches to development and greater representation of voices from the South. The belief is that while mass media allows for the learning of new ideas, interpersonal networks encourage the shift from knowledge to continued practice.

Communication for development has thus come to be seen as a way to amplify voice, facilitate meaningful participation, and foster social change. The 2006 World Congress on Communication for Development defined C4D as 'a social process based on dialogue using a broad range of tools and methods. It is also about seeking change at different levels including listening, building trust, sharing knowledge and skills, building policies, debating and learning for sustained and meaningful change'. Such two-way, horizontal approaches to communication include public hearings, debates, deliberations and stakeholder consultations, participatory radio and video, community-based theatre and story-telling, and web forums.

It encompasses access to and exchange of information, dialogue, creation of knowledge and open access to knowledge, development communication, strategic communication, participatory communication, expressive culture, media, information and communications infrastructure and technologies.

The growing interest in this sector led to the first World Congress on Communication for Development organized by the FAO ComDev Team, The World Bank and The Communication initiative in Rome, Italy, in October 2006.

Communication for Development is built around four axes:

The four axis of Communication for Development

1. Com4Prom: Communication for Promotion promotes development aid in donor countries to justify how and why development aid resources are spent.
2. Com4Imple: Communication for Implementation facilitates the implementation of development aid on developing countries by explaining development programmes to local populations.
3. Com4Power: Communication for Empowerment gives power to local population to report on the implementation of the development aid they receive from donor countries.
4. Com4Coord: Communication for Coordination allows donor entities to coordinate their activities on a global scale through a series of coordination tools and rules.

== Com4Prom: Promoting development aid in donor countries ==
How to attract audiences to learn about development aid using positive news and success stories

Promotion of cooperation for development in donor countries aims to explain why and how aid programmes funds are spent in developing and emerging countries. The communication targets two audiences: the public at large concerned by general aspects of development and field actors concerned by technical aspects.

Communication strategists in charge of promoting general aspects of development aid among donor countries' citizens consider that Com 4 Prom requires "serious" formats to reach the audience to be produced by journalists and documentaries makers. News mainly focus on things that "go wrong", shaping information as catastrophic. On the other hand, documentaries, even if very interesting and shot with the highest standards, are too frequently tagged as "boring" by broadcasters and consequently pushed in the late hours of week days or early week-end TV grid's slots. Therefore, news create a negative image of development aid, made of tensions and disasters meanwhile documentaries are only seen by few already convinced TV viewers who know what the subject is about. The more people watch information on development aid, the more they feel that nothing changes over the years: the situation is catastrophic, no progress is made. Citizens are driven to despair and turn inactive. This lack of interest and participation facilitates the reduction of development public funding and brings less citizens' support to NGOs.

To reduce the missing link between donors and reality in the field, Com4Prom focuses on Positive Communication, showing successes and concrete results and using trendy and participatory formats that turn audiences into participatory citizens and active consumers. Participatory citizens support cooperation projects in developing countries and volunteer on NGOs' activities. They push governments to implement the 0.7% budget target for development and ask them to support, implement and respect international conventions through multilateral organisations. Active consumers care about their ethical and ecological print, supporting fair trade. They push corporate companies to implement and extend their corporate social responsibility programs.
