= List of Dutch women photographers =

This is a list of women photographers who were born in the Netherlands or whose works are closely associated with that country.

== A ==
- Emmy Andriesse (1914–1953), noted for her clandestine photography of the Netherlands under Nazi rule
- Maria Austria (1915–1975), theatre and documentary photographer

== B ==
- Katharina Behrend (1888–1973), German-born Dutch amateur photographer, wide variety of genres including a nude self-portrait
- Eva Besnyö (1910–2002), Dutch-Hungarian photographer active in the Dutch "New Photography" movement
- Ania Bien (born 1946)
- Lucie Blachet (1828–1907), early female photographer
- Sacha de Boer (born 1967), portrait-, travel-, and documentary photographer
- Melanie Bonajo (born 1978) (active since 2007), contemporary artist, photographer
- Marrie Bot (born 1946), pilgrimages, mentally handicapped, multicultural funeral and mourning rituals

== C ==
- Violette Cornelius (1919–1997), photographer, resistance fighter

== D ==
- Rineke Dijkstra (born 1959), portraits of adolescents
- Desiree Dolron (born 1963), documentary, still life, portrait and architectural photographer

== E ==
- Angèle Etoundi Essamba (born 1962), Cameroonian-born photographer based in Amsterdam

== G ==
- HJIM van Gasteren (born 1964), multimedia artist, photographer
- Margi Geerlinks (born 1970), photographer
- Sophia Goudstikker (1865–1924), Dutch-German feminist and photographer

== H ==
- Jacqueline Hassink (1966–2018), visual artist, noted for her Table of Power projects related to the world economy; also lectures on photography
- Maria Hille (1827–1893), first professional female photographer in the Netherlands

== K ==
- Ata Kandó (1913–2017), noted for her Dream in the Wood fantasy photos, Hungarian refugee photos and Amazonian indigenous images
- Emma Kirchner (1830–1909) German born photographer who lived and worked in the Netherlands, first, and for over 30 years, the only professional woman photographer working in Delft and the surrounding area.

== L ==
- Ine Lamers (born 1954), photographer, video installation artist
- Inez van Lamsweerde (born 1963), fashion photographer
- Dana Lixenberg (born 1964), portrait photographer

== M ==
- Awoiska van der Molen (born 1972)
- Bertien van Manen (1935–2024), documentary photographer
- Hellen van Meene (born 1972), portrait photographer
- Maria Antonia Merkelbach (1904–1985), professional photographer in Amsterdam
- Awoiska van der Molen (born 1972), black and white landscape photographer

== P ==
- Carla van de Puttelaar (born 1967), fine art photographer
- Charlotte Pothuis (1867–1945), co-owner of Dames Sluijter & Boom in Amsterdam

== S ==
- Viviane Sassen (born 1972), fine art and fashion photographer
- Renée Scheltema (born 1951), documentary filmmaker, photographer
- Marleen Sleeuwits (born 1980), photographer and installation artist
- Margriet Smulders (born 1955), flower photographer
- Ellen Spijkstra (born 1957), nature photographer
- Annemarie Spilker (born 1980), self-portraits, landscapes

== T ==
- Alexine Tinne (1835–1869), first female photographer in the Netherlands, produced large images in The Hague

== W ==
- Marijke van Warmerdam (born 1959), photographer, installation artist
- Ans Westra (1936–2023), see New Zealand
- Annemie Wolff (1906–1994), German-Dutch photographer, photographed Jewish children and adults in 1943

== Z ==
- Flore Zoé (born 1975), fine art and fashion photographer

== See also ==
- List of women photographers
