= Veronika Fialka-Moser =

- Born: 16 July 1955; Vienna, Austria
- Died: 2 April 2014 (aged 58)
- Education: Medical University of Vienna
- Occupations: Physician, professor
- Employer: Medical University of Vienna
- Known for: First woman appointed Clinical Professor at the Medical University of Vienna
- Notable work: Research on complex regional pain syndrome, cancer rehabilitation, lymphedema, and sex differences in medicine
- Awards: Veronika Fialka Moser Diversity Prize

Veronika Fialka-Moser (16 July 1955 – 2 April 2014) was an Austrian physician and professor of Physical Medicine and Rehabilitation at the Medical University of Vienna. She was the first woman to be appointed a Clinical Professor at the Medical University of Vienna.

== Early life and education ==
Fialka-Moser was born in Vienna. She studied medicine at the Medical University of Vienna, where she specialised in physical and sports medicine. She graduated in 1979 and completed specialist training in rheumatology and sports medicine.

== Research and career ==
Fialka-Moser studied complex regional pain syndrome, cancer rehabilitation, lymphedema and sex differences in medicine.

In 1999 Fialka-Moser was made President of the European Union of Medical Specialists (UEMS) Section of Physical Medicine and Rehabilitation. In 2001 she helped to establish the Clinical Affairs Committee of the European Union of Medical Specialists to focus on Physical Medicine and Rehabilitation (PRM). The committee developed an accreditation process for PRM, which is adapted to reflect the environment in which the accreditation is taking place.

She was a member of the Senate at the Medical University of Vienna. In honour of her commitment to diversity in medicine, the Medical University of Vienna established the Veronika Fialka Moser Diversity Prize.

== Select publications ==
- Tatjana Paternostro-Sluga; Martina Grim-Stieger; Martin Posch; Othmar Schuhfried; Gerda Vacariu; Christian Mittermaier; Christian Bittner; Veronika Fialka-Moser (2008). "Reliability and validity of the Medical Research Council (MRC) scale and a modified scale for testing muscle strength in patients with radial palsy". Journal of Rehabilitation Medicine. 40 (8): 665–671. doi:10.2340/16501977-0235. PMID 19020701. Wikidata Q53047614.
- Wolfgang Gruther; Thomas Benesch; Carina Zorn; et al. (2008). "Muscle wasting in intensive care patients: ultrasound observation of the M. quadriceps femoris muscle layer". Journal of Rehabilitation Medicine. 40 (3): 185–189. doi:10.2340/16501977-0139. PMID 18292919. Wikidata Q51713982.
- Chaudhry HJ (1999). "Ultrasound therapy for calcific tendinitis of the shoulder". The New England Journal of Medicine. 341 (16): 1237. doi:10.1056/nejm199910143411614. PMID 10523158. Wikidata Q73087129.

== Personal life ==
Fialka-Moser died in 2014.
