= Edward C. Franklin =

American physician

Edward Claus Franklin (April 14, 1928 – February 20, 1982) was a pioneering American immunologist and physician. He made major gains in the study of the aging process with contributions that led to the discovery of a group of abnormal protein aggregates known as amyloids, and played a key role in the fight against arthritis, Alzheimer's disease, Parkinson's disease, Huntington's disease, diabetes, and cardiac arrhythmia. Franklin was a professor of medicine at the New York University School of Medicine, a member of the National Academy of Sciences, president of the American Society for Clinical Investigation, and director of Irvington House Institute. The New York Times called Franklin "an international authority on the human immune system".

Franklin discovered heavy chain disease, one type of which is named after him (Franklin's disease). The Edward C. Franklin Award, which is given for achievements in immunology, has been established in his name.

== Life and career ==
Franklin was born in Berlin, Germany in 1928 and immigrated to the US in 1939 as an escapee from Nazism. After fleeing Nazi Germany, Franklin and his family spent a fifteen-month sojourn in Cuba until they were finally able to immigrate to New York City in 1940. He graduated from Townsend Harris High School in Queens, New York at the age of fifteen and went on to receive his undergraduate degree from Harvard University in 1946 where he graduated magna cum laude as a biochemistry major at the age of eighteen while also working full time. Franklin then received his medical degree from the N.Y.U. School of Medicine in 1950. After medical school, Franklin interned at New York's Beth Israel Hospital and did his residency in internal medicine at Montefiore Hospital and Bronx Veterans Administration Hospital. During this time, Franklin took two years off to serve military duty.

In May 1956, Franklin married Dorothea Zucker-Franklin, a hematologist and clinical researcher, and they had a daughter, Deborah Julie Franklin, who later went on to become director of cancer rehabilitation at Thomas Jefferson University in Philadelphia, Pennsylvania, . In 1955, Franklin started as research associate at the Rockefeller Institute and from 1958 to 1974 served as an assistant and full-time professor of medicine at N.Y.U. In 1974, He was elected president of the American Society for Clinical Investigation and was elected to the National Academy of Sciences in 1979. On February 20, 1982, Franklin died of a brain tumor at the age of 54. Franklin was said to enjoy activities such as skiing, chamber music, literature, art and even owned a farm in the Berkshires that he routinely visited with his family. Franklin was described by a colleague as "a quiet and private man lacking the more overt exuberance of his wife."

== Contributions and research ==
Franklin was most well known for discovering heavy chain disease, which is characterized by the excess production of paraproteins in the immunoglobulins of our white blood cells causing short, truncated heavy chains, abnormal antigen binding sites, and leading to various auto-immune disorders. Franklin uncovered that serum and urine from a patient with heavy chain disease retained incomplete or abnormal heavy chains and showed a virtual disappearance of the normal globulin function. Franklin's particular study examined abnormalities in gamma globulins of patients with heavy chain disease, which would later cause this particular form of the disease to become known as Franklin's disease. Besides abnormalities to the heavy chains themselves, Franklin would later discover that some heavy chains contained abnormalities in their disulfide linkages leading to the abnormal bonding between the heavy and light chain regions of immunoglobulins. New clinical tools such as the ultracentrifuge and free electrophoresis made it possible for Franklin to separate and study various proteins involved with heavy chain disease. Later in his career, Franklin would also incorporate techniques such as cellulose-based ion exchange chromatography, molecular sieve chromatography, and zone electrophoresis to further analyze and study these paraproteins. Franklin's efforts would lead to innovations in discovering a group of protein aggregates called amyloids, which have been associated with diseases such as Alzheimer's, Parkinson's, Huntington's, Diabetes, Cardiac arrhythmia and more than 50 other human diseases. Franklin also made significant contributions to our understanding of essential mixed cryoglobulinemia, a medical condition in which the blood contains large amounts of pathological cold sensitive antibodies called cryoglobulins.
