= Rokin Plaza =

Dutch retail complex

Coordinates: 52.37216°N 4.89268°E

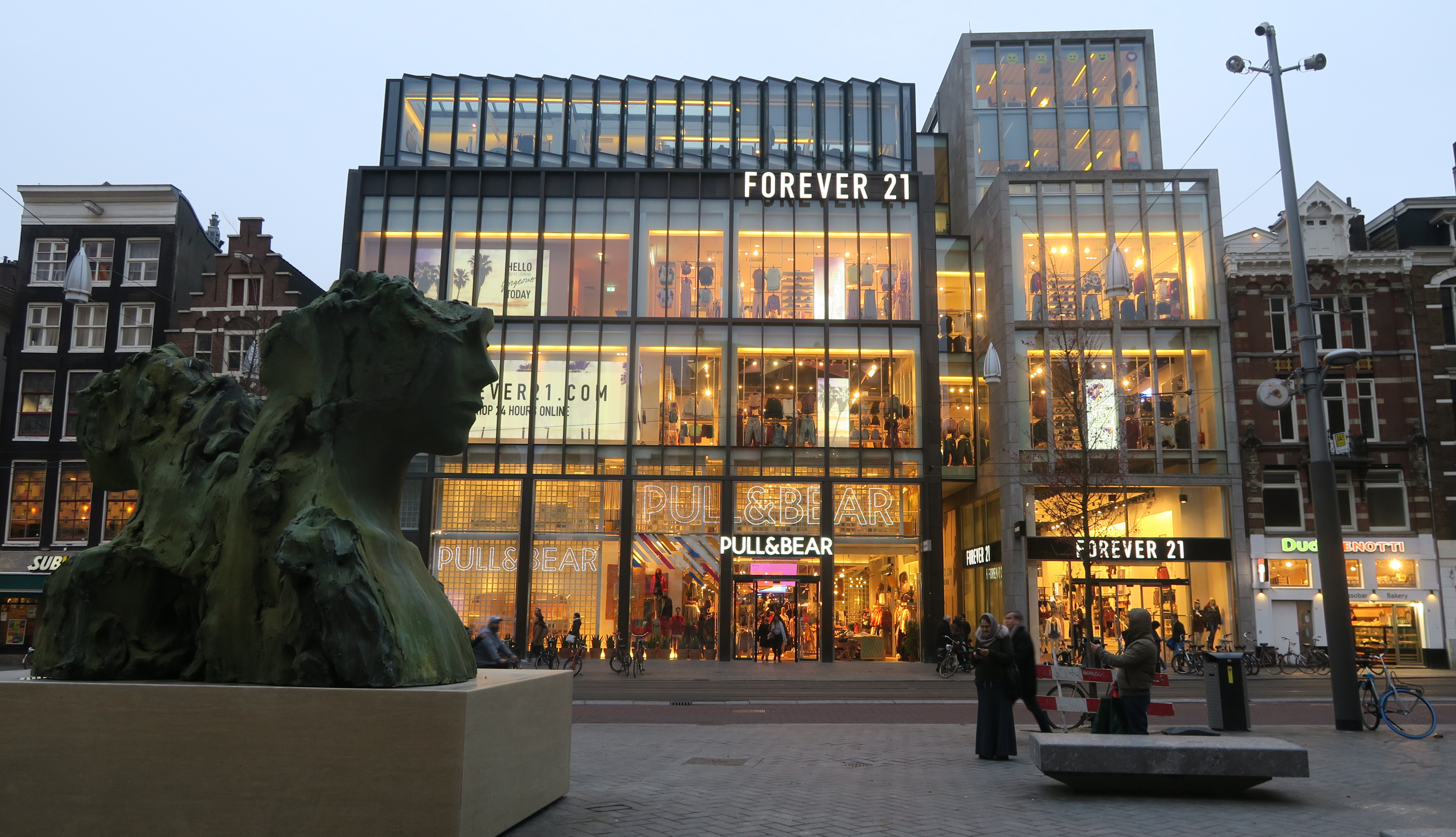
Rokin Plaza with the current facade in 2017.

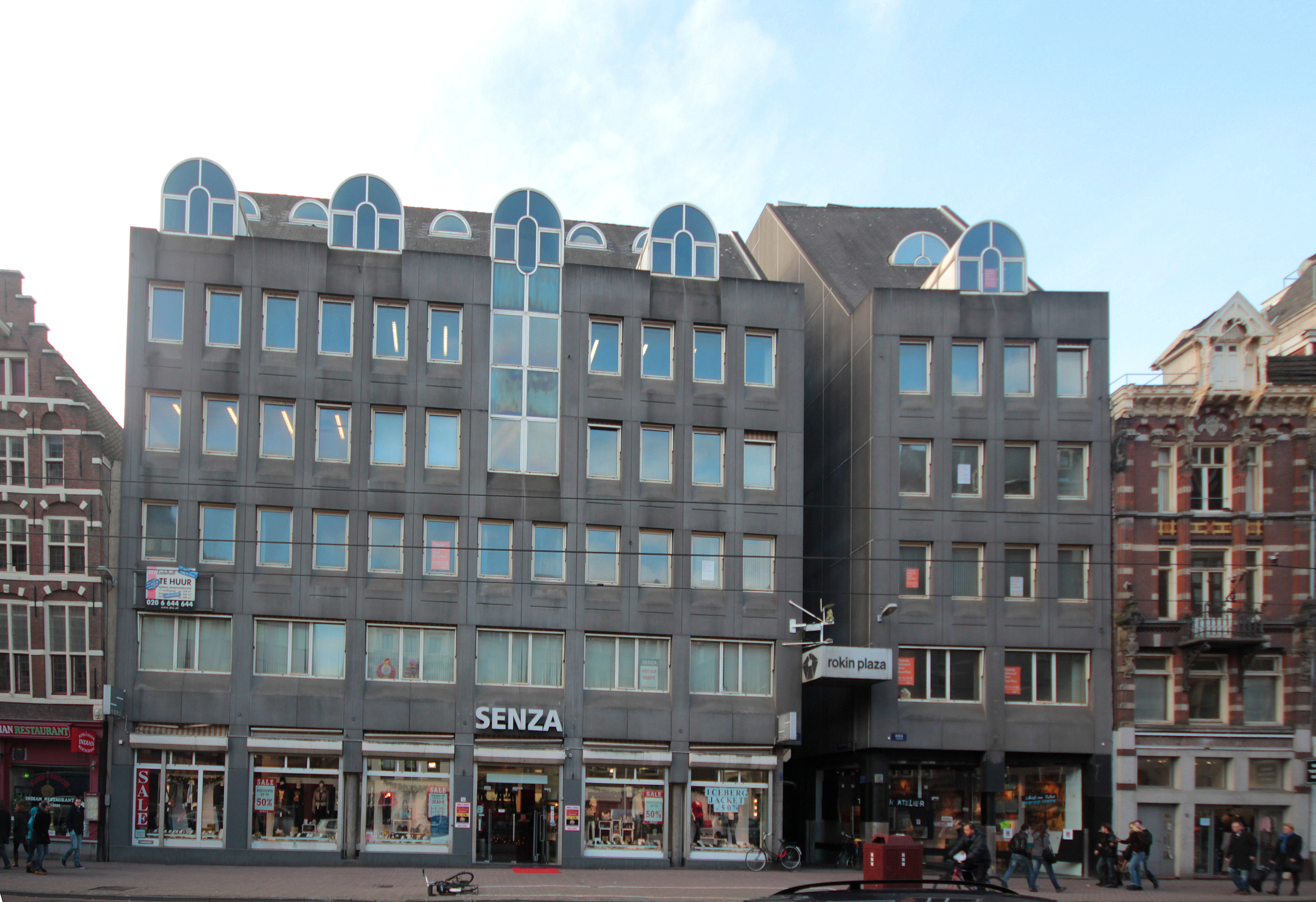
Rokin Plaza in 2012. The facade has since then been completely transformed.

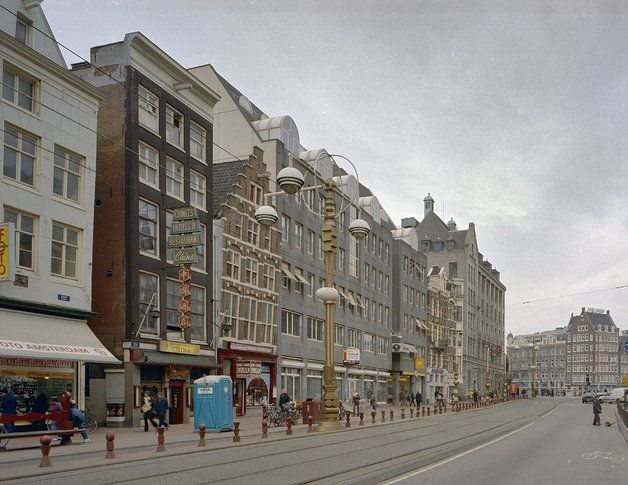
The Rokin in 2003 with Rokin Plaza in the middle.

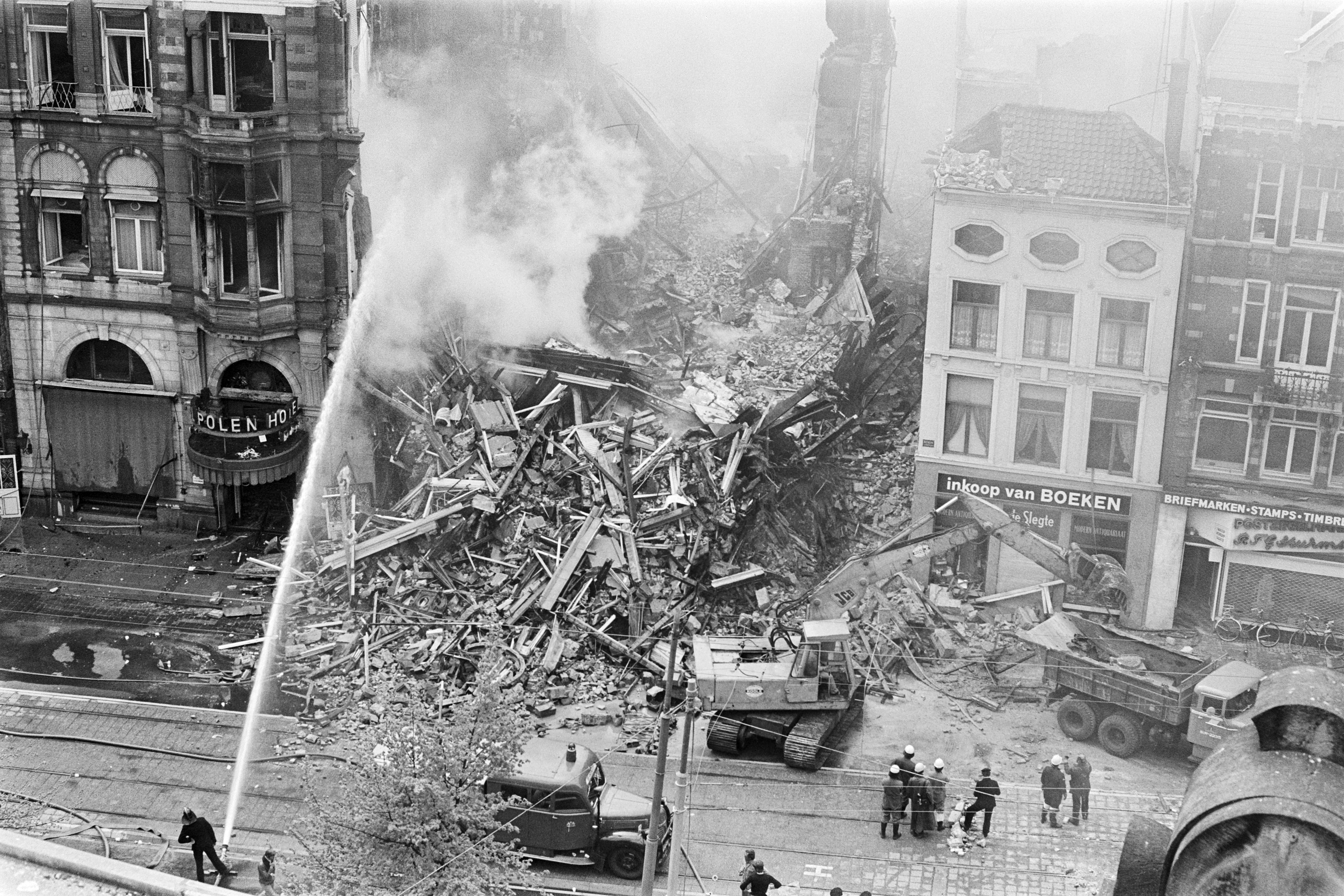
Aftermath of the fire at Hotel Polen on 9 May 1977.

The Rokin Plaza is a large retail complex south of the Dam in Amsterdam which used to be an office building. The name refers to the Rokin canal on which the building sits.

== Location and interior ==
The complex lies behind the Madame Tussauds building. Through the building lies the Papenbroeksteeg which connects the Kalverstraat with the Rokin and also gives access to the offices and the interior court. The building houses many offices.

Hotel Polen which burned down in 1977 (causing 33 deaths) stood at the location presently occupied by the Rokin Plaza.

As of 2010 Rokin Plaza was one of the largest office buildings in the centre of Amsterdam with an office space of 5,086 square metres (54,750 sq ft) and a retail area of 1,308 square metres (14,080 sq ft).

In that year the Rokin Plaza was sold to Emmes Group. In August 2012 it was announced that the American fashion chain Forever 21 would open a branch in the building in late 2013. This date wasn't met. After the facade was completely changed Forever 21 opened a branch in the building on 19 April 2014. In another part of the building the Spanish fashion chain Pull & Bear opened a branch. Since 2018 the Japanese fashion chain Uniqlo is located there.
