= Ed van der Elsken =

Dutch photographer

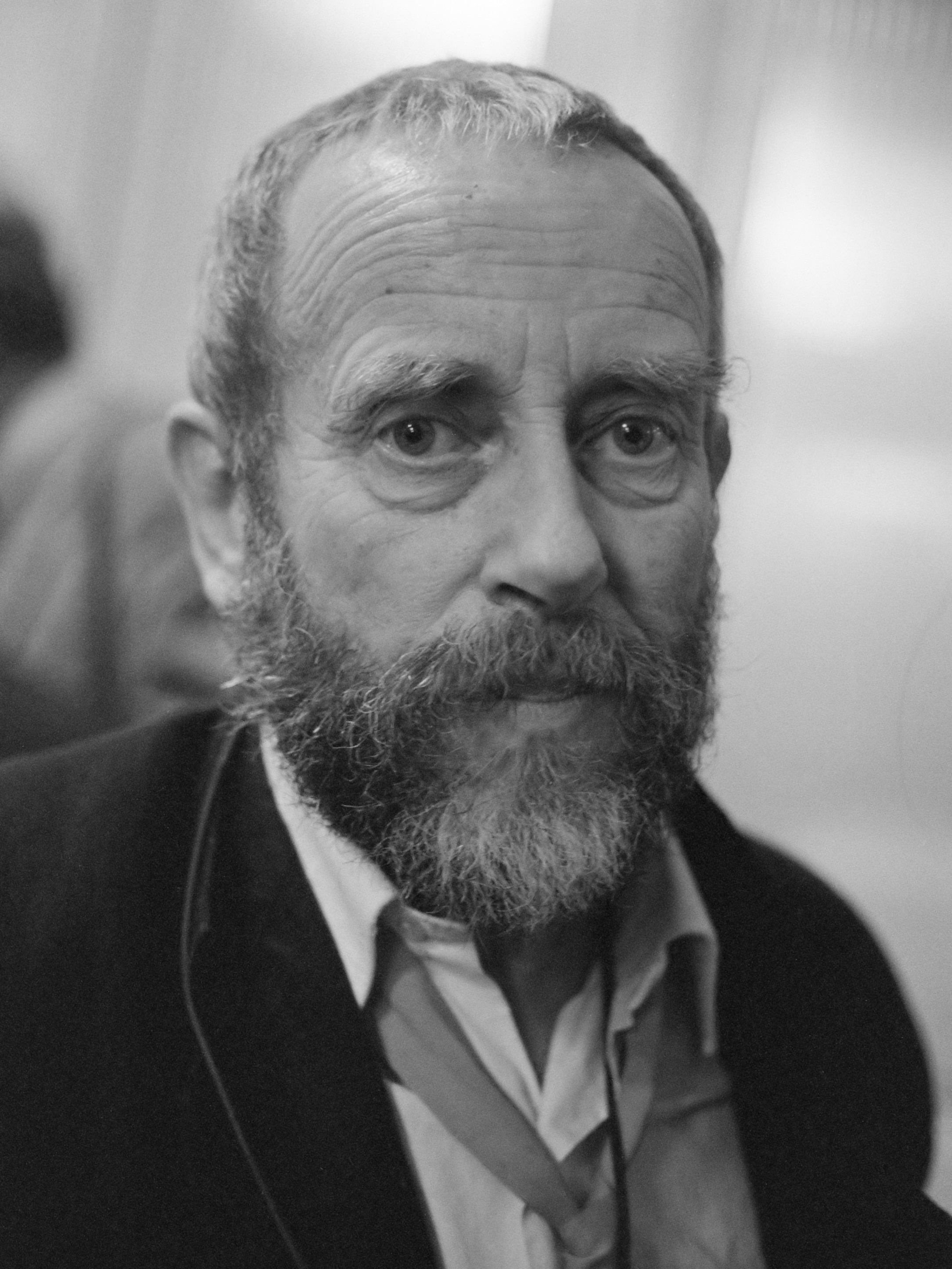
- Ed van der Elsken (1988)
- Born: 10 March 1925; Amsterdam, Netherlands
- Died: 28 December 1990 (aged 65); Edam, Netherlands
- Known for: Photography, film
- Spouse(s): Ata Kandó, Gerda van der Veen, Anneke Hillhorst

Eduard van der Elsken (10 March 1925 – 28 December 1990) was a Dutch photographer and filmmaker.

His imagery provides quotidian, intimate and autobiographic perspectives on the European zeitgeist spanning the period of the Second World War into the 1970s in the realms of love, sex, art, music (particularly jazz), and alternative culture. He described his camera as 'infatuated', and said: "I'm not a journalist, an objective reporter, I'm a man with likes and dislikes". His style is subjective and emphasises the seer over the seen; a photographic equivalent of first-person speech.

== Early life ==
Ed van der Elsken was born on 10 March 1925 in Amsterdam, Netherlands. In 1937, wanting to become a sculptor, he learned stone-cutting at Amsterdam's Van Tetterode Steenhouwerij. After completing preliminary studies at the Instituut voor Kunstnijverheidsonderwijs, the predecessor of the Rietveld Academy (dir. Mart Stam), he enrolled (in 1944) in the professional sculpture program, which he abandoned to escape Nazi forced labour. That year, after the Battle of Arnhem he was stationed in a mine-disposal unit where he was first shown Picture Post by British soldiers. Later, in 1947, he discovered American sensationalist photographer Weegee's Naked City. These encounters inspired his interest in photography and that year he took work in photo sales and attempted a correspondence course with the Fotovakschool in Den Haag, failing the final examination. He subsequently gained membership of the GKf (Note: The GKf is a photographers association that was founded in 1945 by Cas Oorthuys, Emmy Andriesse, Eva Besnyö and Carel Blazer. Other prominent photographers soon joined, all of whom played an important role in the resistance movement during the war. What united these photographers was not only their artistic vision, but a mutual social engagement) (photographer's section of the Dutch federation of practitioners of the applied arts).

== Paris ==
At the suggestion of Dutch photographer Emmy Andriesse (1914–1953) he moved in 1950 to Paris. He was employed in the darkrooms of the Magnum photography agency, printing for Henri Cartier-Bresson (who was impressed with his street photography), Robert Capa and Ernst Haas. There he met (and in 1954 married) fellow photographer Ata Kandó (Note: Ata Kando (born Budapest, 1913), the daughter of Hungarian parents, writer Margit G. Beke and Professor Imre Görög. She calls herself 'Ata' from her first name Etelka, and Kando is the name of her first husband, the painter Gyula Kando, with whom she left for Paris in 1932. Her commercial photographic career began as an assistant at Magnum immediately after the War. Later she photographed for Paris fashion houses and continued to do so after accompanying Van der Elsken to the Netherlands.) (b. 1913 Budapest, Hungary), twelve years his senior, living with her three children among the 'ruffians' and bohemians of Paris from 1950 to 1954.

Ata was a principled documentarian whose pictures taken in the forests of the Amazon among the Piraoa and Yekuana tribes are her best known, (Note: see her illustrations in Soundmaking, magic and personality by Jacqueline van Ommeren. (English translation of Bevrijd de dommen van hun domheid). Amsterdam: Rodopi, 1979. ISBN 90-6203-792-5) but her more poetic leanings, exemplified in her Droom in het Woud (Dream in the Wood, photographed 1954 in Switzerland and Austria, published 1957) must also have been an influence on Van der Elsken and his decision to move from newspaper reportage to aim to become a magazine photojournalist. Consequently, much of his work documented his own energetic and eccentric life experience subjectively, presaging the work of Larry Clark, Nan Goldin or Wolfgang Tillmans. Thus his adopted family and their lives became the subjects of his photographs along with the people he met, during this Paris period, including Edward Steichen (Note: Steichen appears in a photo Van der Elsken photo took in a Paris cafe in 1953 in Ed van der Elsken: Parijs Foto's—1950–1954. Edited with text by Anthon Beeke. Amsterdam, Bert Bakker, 1981.) (Note: "After leaving Sweden, Steichen journeyed to Amsterdam. Following the success of the Stockholm meeting, similar gatherings were held in The Hague and in Amsterdam. Eva Besnyo (1910-2003), a Dutch photographer of Hungarian birth attended the meeting in Amsterdam. She remembers a large assembly at the studio of photographer Paul Huf (1924-2002). The meeting used the 'Stockholm protocol'; that is, photographers brought images, Steichen explained his plans for an exhibition on mankind and looked at photographs. Besides Besnyo, photographers present included Cas Oorthuys, Emmy Andriesse, Carl Blazer, Maria Austria, Ed van der Elsken, Henk Jonker and several others. Besnyo claims that most photographers did not dare bring too many of their photographs. However, photographer Ed van der Elsken (1925- 1990), whom she identified as the best of them all, brought practically his entire oeuvre. Steichen spent a large part of the evening looking at Van der Elsken's images, encouraging and advising the young photographer in his work. Elsken went on to enjoy a successful career; publishing several books of his work. Six Dutch photographers were included in The Family of Man exhibition, all of whom had attended the meeting at Paul Huf's studio." from Kristen Gresh (2005) The European roots of The Family of Man, History of Photography, 29:4, 331-343, DOI: 10.1080/03087298.2005.10442815) who used eighteen of the photographer's Saint-Germain-des-Prés images in a survey show (1953) Postwar European Photography and another in "The Family of Man". The latter photograph featured in the 'adult play' section of the show, and is a chiaroscuro, tight frame cropping fragments of the faces of two women and a man who eyes others at an opening or event over his cigarette, and a male hand (possibly v. d. Elsken's) thrusting a wine glass into the foreground. It is likely his introduction to Steichen (who appears in the photographer's Parijs! : 1950-1954) was via Robert Frank who scouted European exhibitors for the MoMA show.

Another encounter was with Vali Myers (1930–2003) who became the haunting kohl-eyed heroine of his roman à clef photo-novel Een liefdesgeschiedenis in Saint-Germain-des-Prés (1956; its English-language version was titled Love on the left bank).

== Love on the Left Bank ==
"Een liefdesgeschiedenis in Saint-Germain-des-Prés" ('Love on the left bank') published in 1956, and designed by Dutch graphic designer, sculptor and typographer Jurriaan Schrofer (1926–1990), is recognised as a particular contribution to the photobook; the beeldroman (photonovel), an essentially self-reflexive European genre.

Van der Elsken initially put together a dummy of his text and images himself, but could not attract the interest of a publishing house. However, he succeeded with the renowned British magazine Picture Post, which devoted a four-part series in 1954 to the imagery entitled Why did Roberto leave Paris?. The editors felt it necessary to inform the reader that these were pictures not from a movie, but a "real-life story about people who do exist".

The love interest in this unsophisticated tale is the Mexican boy Manuel (Picture Post used his real name, Robert). Manuel tells how in Paris he fell in love with the beautiful Ann (Vali Myers), who hangs out in bars in Saint Germain des Prés and dances wildly in the jazz cellars. However, it is unrequited love; for Ann, always surrounded by men, shows no interest in Manuel. After learning of her lesbian relationship with her girlfriend Geri, Manuel returns disappointed back to Mexico. At home, he receives a letter from Ann telling him that she and Geri have a venereal disease and that they suspect he also has it (Picture Post censored mention of venereal disease, substituting a 'sanitised' ending, against Van der Elsken's wishes, in which Roberto goes back to Mexico because he missed his mother's cooking!). She comforts him with the thought that he really belongs to the "gang". Partly autobiographical and partly fictional (Van der Elsken was attracted to the extravagant Vali Myers) a number of elements - such as Manuel's imprisonment - are drawn from accounts of the other bohemians.

The book was accepted for publication thanks to the innovative layout of designer Jurriaan Schrofer, who later also designed Van der Elsken's Bagara (1958). (Note: He also designed Ata Kandó's and Violette Cornelius' untitled book of photographs of Hungarian refugees at the Austrian-Hungarian border fleeing the Russian invasion of Hungary in 1956, produced for the benefit of Hungarian children.) Like his contemporary Van der Elsken he was a member of the Schrofer GKf, the Association of Practitioners of Applied Arts. Inspired by the medium of film Schrofer and Van der Elsken conceived a layout applying all sorts of cinematic elements, such as the flashback; the negative outcome of the love story is shown in the photo and the text on the first page, and what follows is a long flashback in which Manuel tells in first person, in the text and captions, of his experiences in Saint Germain des Prés. At the end of the book the first picture with the three protagonists reappears, with Dramatic irony. Combinations of close-ups, medium shots with wide or long are used in the layout as Schrofer combines large, medium-sized and small images and also square and 3:2 format pictures (Van der Elsken photographed with Nikon and Leica 35mm and a Rolleicord 6×6). Close-ups of the faces of Ann and Manuel were blown up to the breadth of a spread, while small photos are aligned in film strips like contact prints on a page. Photographs of the same act, like a boy and girl embracing each other in a bar, are repeated and interspersed. At the end of the book uninterrupted, mostly full-bleed, pictures are assembled into a dream sequence. Manuel, imprisoned for robbery, thinks only of Ann. In his first dream she poses, lost in thought, against a weathered wall, on which are the white graffiti 'rêve' (cropped from grève: 'Strike!'). On the following pages she appears to Manuel as pin-up and mysterious femme fatale, a narcissist who can love only her own reflection. Then there are five pages of self-portraits by Ann/Myers; surrealistic charcoal drawings of her emaciated, opium-addicted body and compulsive self-destruction. Manuel's nightmare reaches a dramatic climax in the photo where Ann, her pale eyes closed, self-poisoned, floats in a steamy mirror, followed by a black blank page.

The book was the first of some twenty Van der Elsken publications. It quickly sold out in Europe and the UK, and its filmic qualities led to Van der Elsken's subsequent experiments with, and parallel career in, cinema.

Amongst its pages can be found the faces not only of artists but also of nascent Lettrist International members and Situationists at the cafe Chez Moineau. Twenty years later, the heroine, Vali Myers, re-appeared in his film Death in the Port Jackson Hotel (1971, 36 min. 16mm colour).

== Amsterdam and international travel ==
Upon moving back to Amsterdam in 1955, he recorded members of the Dutch avant garde COBRA, including Karel Appel whom he later filmed (Karel Appel, componist, 1961, 16 min., 16mm, black & white, and De Appeliep, 1965, 14 min., black & white,). He separated from and divorced Ata Kando.

He then traveled extensively, to Bagara 1957 (now in Central African Republic), and to Tokyo and Hong Kong in 1959 to 1960, with Gerda van der Veen (1935–2006) also a photographer, whom he married (25 September 1957). He filmed for Welkom In Het Leven, Lieve Kleine the homebirth of their second child, Daan, in the old-fashioned, working-class Nieuwmarkt in Amsterdam. This is an early example of cinema production with a small shoulder-mounted camera synced with sound. He continued in motion imagery his subjective stance in which the camera operator interacts live from behind the camera with subject, obviating the need for the intrusion of an interviewer or presenter, and recording the immediate experience. His style was immediately influential on the television of Hans Keller, Roelof Kiers and others.

== Later life ==
From 1971 he lived with his third wife, photographer Anneke Hilhorst (1949 - ), in the country near Edam, where their son, John, was born. During this period he continued to travel and worked prodigiously between film and photography, producing a further 14 books and broadcasting more than 20 films with the collaboration and assistance of Hillhorst.

His last film was Bye (1990) an autobiographical work to his terminal prostate cancer.

He died on 28 December 1990 in Edam in the Netherlands.

== Books ==
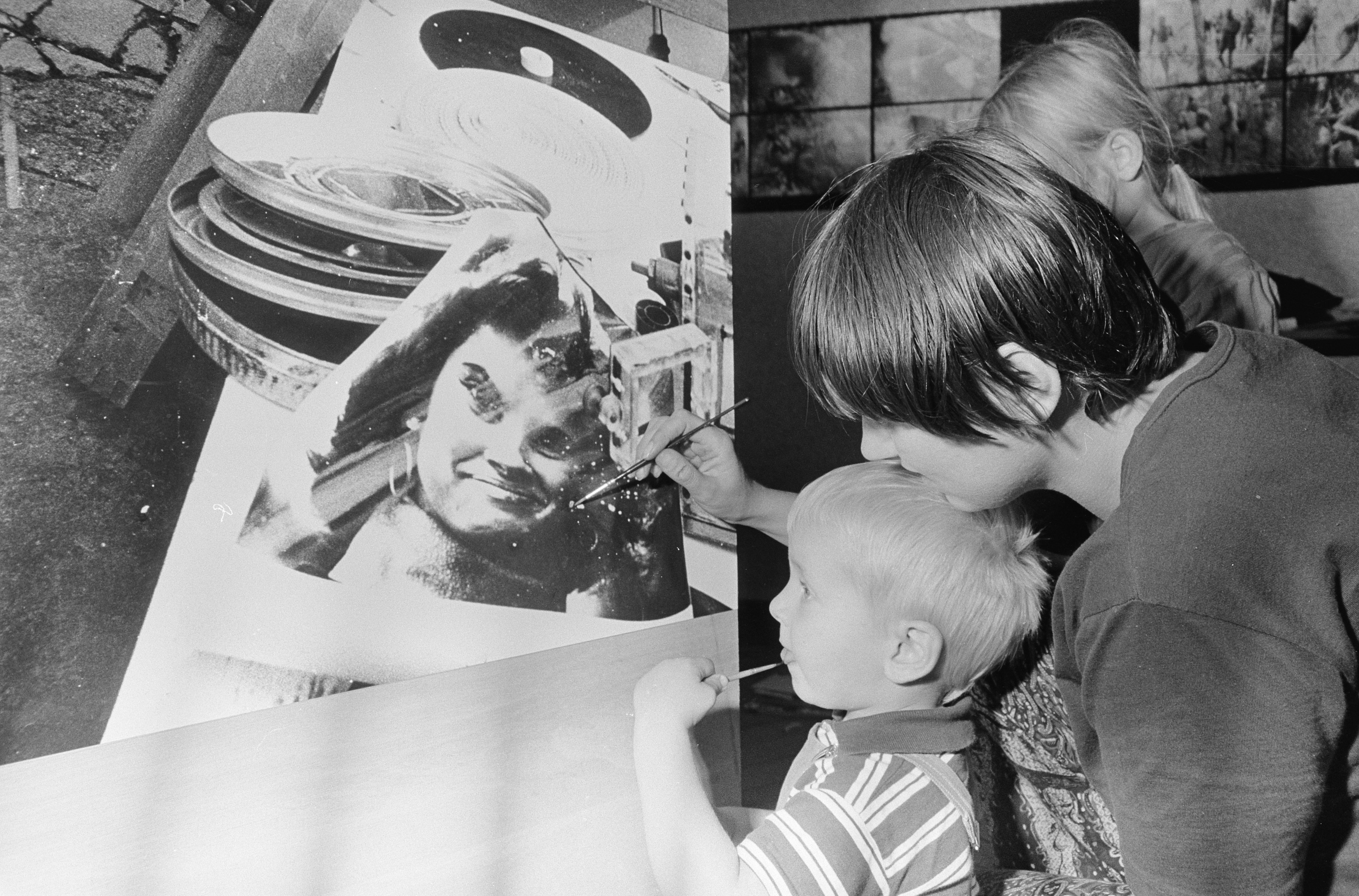
Van der Elsken's wife Gerda van der Veen before an exhibition by Van der Elsken in the Stedelijk Museum Amsterdam, 1966

- Een liefdesgeschiedenis in Saint Germain des Prés (1956)
- Bagara (1958)
- Jazz (1959)
- Dans Theater (1960)
- de Jong & van Dam NV 1912-1962 (1962)
- Sweet life (1966)
- Wereldreis in foto's vier delen (1967–1968)
- Eye Love you (1977)
- Zomaar een sloot ergens bij Edam (1977)
- Hallo! (1978)
- Amsterdam! Oude foto's 1947-1970 (1979)
- Avonturen op het land (1980)
- Parijs! Foto's 1950-1954 (1981)
- Are you famous? (1985)
- San-jeruman-de-pure no koi (1986)
- Jong Nederland 'Adorabele rotzakken' (1987)
- Japan 1959-1960 (1987)
- De ontdekking van Japan (1988)
- Natlab (1989)
- Once upon a time (1991)
- Hong Kong (1997)
- Hit & Run. Ed van der Elsken fotografeert het Philips NatLab (2014)

== Films ==
- 1955: Documentary on the Centre Européen de Recherche Nucléaire in Geneva, VPRO (with Jan Vrijman)
- late 1950s: Traffic Safety Film, VPRO (with Jan Vrijman)
- late 1950s: Film about Van Gelders Paper Factory (badly underexposed). VPRO (with Jan Vrijman)
- 1958: Safari Film commissioned by safari leader Menri Quintard (lost)
- 1959-60: Travelogues, AVRO (lost)
- 1960: Rond De Wereld Met Ed van der Elsken (Around the world with Ed van der Elsken) Year produced: ca. 1960, Camera: Ed van der Elsken, Gerda van der Elsken-van der Veen, Sound: sound track missing. Technical assistant: Gerda van der Elsken-van der Veen 16mm. black-white 38’ 18″
- 1960 Handen (Hands), Broadcast: February 6. 1960, in Mensen kijken, VPRO, 16mm, black-white, Sound: perfotape, 4’ 43″
- 1960 Homemovies 16mm, black-white, silent 4’ 00″
- 1961 Van Varen (About sailing) Commissioned by: Koninklijke Nederlandse Reders Vereniging (Royal Dutch Shipowners' Association) Technical assistant: Gerda van der Elsken-van der Veen, 16mm, black-white, Sound: optical, 19’ 55″
- 1961 De Appel-Iep (Appel elm) Camera: Ed van der Elsken, Koen Wessing, Technical assistants: Johan van der Keuken. Gerda van der Elsken-van der Veen, Koen Wessing, 16mm, black-white, Sound: optical, 29’ 16″
- 1961 Bewogen beweging (Moving motion) Broadcast: shown in the Stedelijk Museum, Amsterdam 16mm, black-white, Sound: silent, 4’ 06″
- 1961 Karel Appel, componist (Karel Appel, composer) Broadcast: shown in the Stedelijk Museum. Amsterdam, Technical assistant: Frits Weiland, 16mm, black-white, Sound: optical, 16’ 25″
- 1962 Dylaby, Broadcast: shown in the Stedelijk Museum, Amsterdam, 16mm, black-white, Sound: optical 10’ 00″
- 1963: Welkom in het leven, lieve kleine (Welcome to life, dear little one) Broadcast: January 15, 1964 and January 24, 1982, VPRO, Technical assistant: Gerda van der Elsken-van der Veen, 16mm. black-white, Sound: perfotape, partially post-synchronised, 36’ 00″
- 1963 Lieverdjes (little darlings) 16mm, black-white, Sound: silent, 10’ 58″
- 1963: Grenzen Van Het Leven (Margins of life). 16mm, black-white, Sound: silent. 28’ 16″
- 1963: Spinoza, 16mm, black-white. Sound: silent. 40’ 38″
- 1965: Waterlooplein, 16mm, black-white. Sound: perfotape. 12’ 11″
- 1965: Afbraakwaterlooplein 1 (Waterlooplein demolition 1). 35mm, black-white. Sound: silent. 5’ 45″
- 1965: Afbraakwaterlooplein 2 (Waterlooplein demolition 2). 16mm and 35mm, black-white. Sound: silent. 2’ 36″
- 1965: Afbraakwaterloopleincrazyscope. 16mm and 35mm, black-white. Sound: silent. 13’ 59″
- 1965: Afbraakenopbouw (Demolition and construction).35mm. black-white. Sound: silent. 5’ 45″
- 1965: Fietsen (Cycling) 16mm. black-white. Sound: silent. 10’ 35″
- 1965: Trots Israel (Proud Israel). Commissioned by: Willem Sandberg. 16mm, black-white. Sound: optical. 16’ 33″
- 1965: Oberhausenxie Westdeutsche Kurzfilmtage. Broadcast: in Film '65, KRO. 16mm, black-white. Sound: silent. 7’ 48″
- 1965: Stiefbeen En Zoon ("Steptoe and Son"). 35mm, black-white. Sound: silent. 2’ 48″
- 1965: De Dokwerker (The dockworker). 35mm, black-white. Sound: silent. 0’ 44″
- 1967: Het Waterlooplein Verdwijnt (Waterlooplein disappears!) Broadcast: March B. 1967 in: Uit Bellevue. VARA. Sound recording: Gerda van der Elsken-van der Veen. 16mm. black-white. Sound: perfotape. 11’ 32″
- 1968: Orldwturmac. 35mm, colour. Sound: silent. 3’ 39″
- 1970: Springende Man En Vrouw (Jumping man and woman). 35mm, black-white. 1' 38″
- 1971: De Verliefde Camera (The Infatuated Camera). Broadcast: June 24. 1971 VPRO. Camera: Ed van der Elsken. Gerda van der Elsken-van der Veen. Technical assistants: Gerda van der Elsken-van der Veen, Bert Nienhuis. 16mm, colour and black-white. Sound: optical. 42’ 50″
- 1972: Death In The Port Jackson Hotel, subtitle: Een portret van Vali Myers [A portrait of Vali Myers] Broadcast: September 28, 1972 VPRO. Montage: Co van Harten, Sound recording: Bert Nienhuis. 16mm. colour. Sound: separate magnetic. 36’ 12″
- 1972: Spelen Maar... (Keep on playing...) Commissioned by: AVRO. Broadcast: October 28. 1972 AVRO. Sound recording: Gerda van der Veen. 16mm. colour. Sound: separate magnetic. 80’ 19″
- 1972: Paardeleven (Horse's life) 16mm. colour. Sound: perfotape. 8’ 08″
- 1972: Dleren Op Het Land (Animals in the countryside). 35mm, black-white. Sound: silent. 1’ 00″
- 1972: Kogelstootster (Shot-putter). 35mm, colour. Sound: silent. 1’ 05″
- 1973: Tom Ükker. 35mm, colour. Sound: silent. 0’ 32″
- 1973: Edam. 16mm, colour. Sound: silent. 8’ 52″
- 1973: Het Prins Bernhard Fonds Helpt (The Prince Bernhard Fund helps) I, II, III. Commissioned by: Prins Bernhard Fonds. 35mm, colour. Sound: optical. 3’ 50″
- 1974: Slootje Springen (Ditch jumping). 35mm. colour. Sound: silent. 0’ 43″
- 1976: Touwtrekken (Tug-of-war). Commissioned by: Nederlandse Touwtrekkersbond. Technical assistant: Anneke van der Elsken-Hilhorst. .Super 8. colour. 14’ 45″
- 1978: Het Is Niet Mis Wat Zij Doen (What they're doing is a good thing): Een film van Memisa. Commissioned by: Memisa (Medical Mission Action). Broadcast: January 16, 1978 AVRO. Editing: Ed van der Elsken, Anneke van der Elsken-Hilhorst. Sound recording: Anneke van der Elsken-Hilhorst. 16mm, colour (Super 8 original now lost). Sound: perfotape. 60’ 00″
- 1980: Avonturen Op Het Land (Adventures in the countryside). Broadcast: March 30, 1980 VPRO. Editing: Ed van der Elsken, Anneke van der Elsken-Hilhorst. Sound recording: Anneke van der Elsken-Hilhorst. Super 8, colour. Sound: perfotape. 78’ 41″
- 1980: Cameratest van der Elsken. 16mm, colour. Sound: silent. 2’ 42″
- 1981: Mister Ed En De Sprekende Film (Mr. Ed and the talking film). Broadcast: May 31. 1981 VPRO. Editing: Ed van der Elsken. Anneke van der Elsken-Hilhorst. Super 8, colour. Sound: perfotape. 74’ 31″
- 1981: Welkom in het leven, lieve kleine Bis (Welcome to life, dear little one: the sequel). Broadcast: January 24. 1982 VPRQ. Sound recording: Anneke van der Elsken-Hilhorst. Technical assistants: Anneke van der Elsken-Hilhorst. William Vogeler, Klaas Beunder, Anton van de Koppel, Henk Meinema. 16mm, black-white and colour. Sound: perfotape. 38’ 45″
- 1981: World Press Photo. 16mm, colour. Sound: perfotape. 4’ 00″
- 1982: Een fotograaf filmt Amsterdam (A photographer films Amsterdam!) Working title: Amsterdams Peil (Amsterdam sounding). Production company: MMC Film BV. (Thijs Chanowski). Commissioned by: Ministry of Culture, Recreation and Social Welfare and the City of Amsterdam. Broadcast: June 29, 19B3 VPRO. Technical assistants: Anneke van der Elsken-Hilhorst, Klaas Beunder, Peter Hekma. Henk Meinema. 16mm, ECN, colour. Sound: optical 57’ 11″
- 1990: Bye. Broadcast: January 27, 1991 VPRO. Camera: Ed van der Elsken, Anneke van der Elsken-Hilhorst. Editing: Ulrike Mischke. Sound recording: Ed van der Elsken, Anneke van der Elsken-Hilhorst. Technical assistant: Anneke van der Elsken-Hilhorst. video VHS-SP), colour and black-white. 1 hour 49″
