= Dorothea Zucker-Franklin =

German-American Medical researcher (1929–2015)

- Photo of Zucker-Franklin, date unknown
- Born: Dorothea Zucker; August 9, 1929; Berlin, Germany
- Died: November 24, 2015 (aged 86); Manhattan, New York City, United States
- Education: Hunter College (BA, 1952); New York Medical College (MD, 1956)
- Spouse: Edward C. Franklin (m. 1956)
- Children: 1 (b. 1964)
- Scientific career
- Fields: Hematology, immunology, cell biology
- Workplaces: New York University School of Medicine

Dorothea Zucker-Franklin (August 9, 1929 – November 24, 2015) was a physician and medical researcher in the fields of hematology, immunology and cell biology. Born in Berlin, Germany, she fled to Amsterdam with her family in 1936 to escape the Nazi regime. In 1948, the family emigrated to New York, where Zucker-Franklin attended Hunter College for her undergraduate education and earned a medical degree from New York Medical College. Following her internship and residency, she trained in electron microscopy, and would become well-known for her use of this technique to study blood cells. She began teaching at the New York University School of Medicine in 1963 and became a full professor in 1974. She was a member of the National Academy of Medicine and a fellow of the American Academy of Arts and Sciences, and served as president of the Society for Leukocyte Biology in 1985 and the American Society of Hematology in 1995.

== Early life and education ==
Zucker-Franklin was born into a Jewish family on August 9, 1929, in Berlin, Germany. (Note: Some older sources give the year of birth as 1930.) Her parents were Julius Zucker, a merchant, and Gertrude Zucker (née Feige), a Prussian-born musician. In the wake of the Nazi Party's rise to power, the family fled to Amsterdam in 1936. Zucker-Franklin attended secondary school there as well as the Joods Lyceum in 1942/43, the same school Anne Frank attended in 1941/42. In 1943, during the German occupation of the Netherlands, Zucker-Franklin was captured and interned in a camp; after their release, the family spent the next few years in hiding in Uithoorn. During this time, Zucker-Franklin developed a friendship with a boy with type 1 diabetes, which sparked her interest in medicine. In 1948 the family fled to the United States, settling in New York. Zucker-Franklin entered Hunter College and graduated with a bachelor's degree in language in 1952. She went on to pursue a medical degree at New York Medical College, graduating in 1956.

In April 1943, shortly before going into hiding with her family in Nazi-occupied Amsterdam, she had her photograph taken by Annemie Wolff.

== Career ==
Zucker-Franklin completed her internship at Philadelphia General Hospital and her residency at Montefiore Hospital. During residency she developed an interest in hematology, and carried out studies on coagulation factors and lymphocyte immunology. Later she studied electron microscopy at New York University. The use of electron microscopy to study blood cells would become a central theme of her research. Through this technique she worked to elucidate the mechanisms of phagocytosis and the structure and function of white blood cells, platelets and megakaryocytes. Zucker-Franklin also collaborated with her husband, Edward C. Franklin, in studies on amyloid protein.

In 1963, Zucker-Franklin began working as an assistant professor at the New York University School of Medicine. She became full professor in 1974. In 1981, Zucker-Franklin served as president of the Society for Leukocyte Biology. That year she published the first edition of Atlas of Blood Cells: Function and Pathology in collaboration with Carlo Grossi; the textbook, extensively illustrated with electron micrographs, has been called "the finest in its class". In 1995, Zucker-Franklin was elected president of the American Society of Hematology and became a member of the National Academy of Medicine. She was awarded an honorary PhD by the City University of New York in 1996 and was made a fellow of the American Academy of Arts and Sciences in 2001.

== Personal life and death ==
In 1956, Zucker-Franklin married Edward C. Franklin, who was then a medical researcher at the Rockefeller Institute. Zucker-Franklin had been friends with Edward during her childhood in Berlin. The couple had a daughter in 1964. They owned a farm together, enjoyed collecting sculptures, and collaborated on medical research until Franklin's death in 1982. On November 24, 2015, Zucker-Franklin died at her home in Manhattan, New York.

== Selected publications ==
=== Articles ===
- Zucker-Franklin, D.; Hirsch, J.G. (1964). "Electron microscope studies on the degranulation of rabbit peritoneal leukocytes during phagocytosis". Journal of Experimental Medicine. 120 (4): 569–576. doi:10.1084/jem.120.4.569. PMC 2137771. PMID 14212120.
- Zucker-Franklin, D.; Davidson, M.; Thomas, L. (1966). "The interaction of mycoplasmas with mammalian cells. I. HeLa cells, neutrophils, and eosinophils". Journal of Experimental Medicine. 124 (3): 521–532. doi:10.1084/jem.124.3.521. PMC 2138233. PMID 5922745.
- Pras, M.; Schubert, M.; Zucker-Franklin, D.; Rimon, A.; Franklin, E.C. (1968). "The characterization of soluble amyloid prepared in water". Journal of Clinical Investigation. 47 (4): 924–933. doi:10.1172/JCI105784. PMC 297240. PMID 5641627.
- Zucker-Franklin, D.; Cao, Y.Z. (1989). "Megakaryocytes of human immunodeficiency virus-infected individuals express viral RNA". Proceedings of the National Academy of Sciences. 86 (14): 5595–5599. Bibcode:1989PNAS...86.5595Z. doi:10.1073/pnas.86.14.5595. PMC 297669. PMID 2748605.
- Shivdasani, R.A.; Rosenblatt, M.F.; Zucker-Franklin, D.; Jackson, C.W.; Hunt, P.; Saris, C.J.M; et al. (1995). "Transcription factor NF-E2 is required for platelet formation independent of the actions of thrombopoeitin/MGDF in megakaryocyte development". Cell. 81 (5): 695–704. doi:10.1016/0092-8674(95)90531-6. PMID 7774011. S2CID 14195541.

=== Books ===
- Braunsteiner, H.; Zucker-Franklin, D. (1962). The physiology and pathology of leukocytes. Grune & Stratton. OCLC 488501003.
- Zucker-Franklin, D.; Grossi, C.E.; Greaves, M.F.; Marmont, A.M. (1981). Atlas of Blood Cells: Function and Pathology. Lea & Febiger. ISBN 0812107837.
