= Ruth Cullen =

Australian-based documentary maker

- Occupation: Documentary Filmmaker
- Website: https://www.ruthcullen.com/

Ruth Cullen is an Australian-based documentary filmmaker who has been making films since 1989 when she directed and produced the acclaimed documentary The Tightrope Dancer about the artist Vali Myers. Tightrope was followed by a sequel in 2002 called Painted Lady which looked at Myers' return to Australia after a 40-year absence. Other films include Becoming Julia in 2003 (producer and director) which followed an Australian farmer called Paul through his gender transition into Julia, the television series About Men (series director) and Heat In The Kitchen (series director).

Her films have been screened at festivals around the world including the International Documentary Festival of Amsterdam (IDFA), Montreal, Los Angeles, Wellington, Sydney and Melbourne film festivals. She is a board member of The Australian Directors Guild and is the former Head of Documentary at Australia's premier film school AFTRS.

In 2014, Cullen was the series writer and director of the widely lauded documentary television series The Dreamhouse which follows three young adults with intellectual disabilities as when they leave home. The Dreamhouse was screened on the ABC in 2014.
