= Anantara Grand Hotel Krasnapolsky Amsterdam =

Luxury hotel in Amsterdam

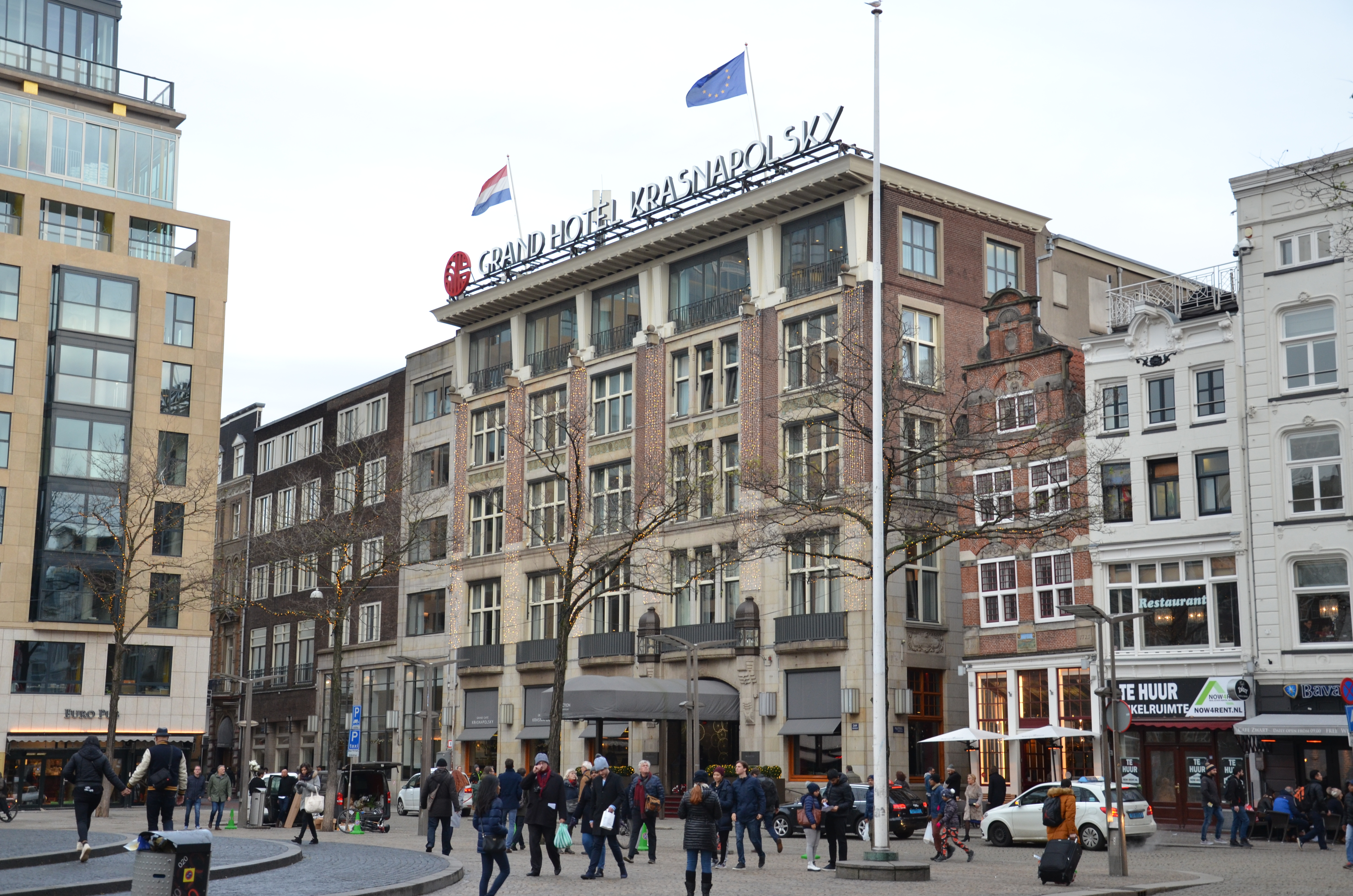
- Interactive map of the Anantara Grand Hotel Krasnapolsky Amsterdam area
- Hotel chain: Anantara Hotels & Resorts

General information
- Location: Dam 9, Amsterdam, Netherlands
- Coordinates: 52.3728°N 4.8941°E
- Opening: 1866; 160 years ago
- Owner: Minor Hotels

Other information
- Number of rooms: 402

Website
- anantara.com/en/grand-hotel-krasnapolsky-amsterdam

The Anantara Grand Hotel Krasnapolsky Amsterdam, colloquially known as Kras, is a five-star luxury hotel located on Dam Square in central Amsterdam, Netherlands. Founded in 1865, the hotel has 402 rooms, a convention center, restaurants, and a pier for boats on the Oudezijds Voorburgwal canal. The hotel is part of the Anantara Hotels & Resorts brand under Minor Hotels.

== History ==
The original owner of the hotel, Adolph Wilhelm Krasnapolsky, purchased the building in 1865 and turned it into a restaurant in 1866. He expanded the property by acquiring adjacent buildings and adding rooms between 1879 and 1880. During the same period, a conservatory with palm trees and a cupola, designed by architect G.B. Salm, was constructed, featuring modern elements such as glass, steel, and electric lighting.

By the exhibition of 1883, the business evolved into a hotel with 125 rooms, with amenities such as hot water and telephones in each room, a rarity in Amsterdam at the time. After World War I, more buildings were purchased and the hotel was extended to Pijlsteeg.

In 1971, the hotel was sold and in 1974, it became the Golden Tulip Hotel Krasnapolsky. In the 1990s, the owners purchased a series of hotels and restaurants, including the Amsterdam Doelen Hotel, Schiller Hotel, and Caransa Hotel. In 1998, Krasnapolsky Hotels & Restaurants N.V. (KHR) bought the Golden Tulip, and in 2000, it was acquired by NH Hotel Group. The hotel was rebranded as the NH Grand Hotel Krasnapolsky and later the NH Collection Grand Hotel Krasnapolsky.

In 2018, Minor Hotels, the parent company of Anantara Hotels & Resorts, acquired a majority stake in NH Hotel Group. The hotel rebranded on April 20, 2022, becoming Anantara Grand Hotel Krasnapolsky.

The hotel is referred to several times in the Swedish novel Socialisten by Ivar Lo-Johansson.

== See also ==
- Hotel Polen fire
