= Hotel Polen fire =

1977 fire in Amsterdam, the Netherlands

- Hotel Polen before it was destroyed by fire
- Date: 9 May 1977
- Venue: Hotel Polen
- Location: Amsterdam, Netherlands; 52.3721°N 4.8926°E
- Type: Fire
- Deaths: 33
- Injuries: 57 (21 severe)

The Hotel Polen fire occurred on 9 May 1977 in Amsterdam, the Netherlands. The conflagration destroyed the Hotel Polen (Hotel Poland), a five-story hotel in the centre of the city which had been built in 1891, as well as the furniture store on the ground level and a nearby bookstore. Many of the tourists staying at the hotel (of whom the majority were Swedes) jumped to their deaths trying to escape the flames. Upon their arrival, the fire department used a life net to help people escape, but not everyone could be saved. The incident resulted in 33 deaths and 57 injuries (21 serious). The cause of the fire is unknown. In 1986, the Polish-born artist Ania Bien created a photographic installation based on the fire which compared it to the Holocaust.

The hotel was located between the Kalverstraat (no. 15–17) and the Rokin (no. 14), near the present day Madame Tussauds. Its place is now occupied by the Rokin Plaza, originally an office building, which today houses several fashion shops.

== Background ==
In the beginning of the 16th century, there was an inn on the site where the Hotel Polen was later located. At the end of the 18th century, the Poolsche Koffiehuis (Polish Coffee House) was established, which began offering guest accommodation in 1857. In 1891, after the adjacent space on the Rokin was bought, the Hotel Polen was established by the Maatschappij tot Exploitatie van het Poolsche Koffiehuis (Polish Coffee House Society), and a building was constructed there which was designed by Eduard Cuypers, a cousin of the better known architect Pierre Cuypers who had designed the Amsterdam Central Station and the Rijksmuseum. The hotel was five stories high, and a café-restaurant was opened on the ground level.

The Hotel Polen was once known as a fashionable place to stay. The café-restaurant was closed at the end of 1974 and its location was subsequently rented to the furniture store Inden. The hotel remained open as a part of the Krasnapolsky Concern.

The building, including the load-bearing elements, was constructed of wood. It had 94 rooms. There were 10 fire extinguishers and 11 fire hoses in the hotel. Only a few escape routes had proper emergency lighting and directions to the emergency exits, and the hotel was also not on a hotline with the emergency centre of the fire department. The building had been inspected by the fire department, first in February 1976, and later in the beginning of 1977, after which the hotel's management was notified in writing that there were severe fire safety defects. A list of improvements which the hotel should implement included complying with the building regulations and the regulations for residence facilities.

== Fire ==
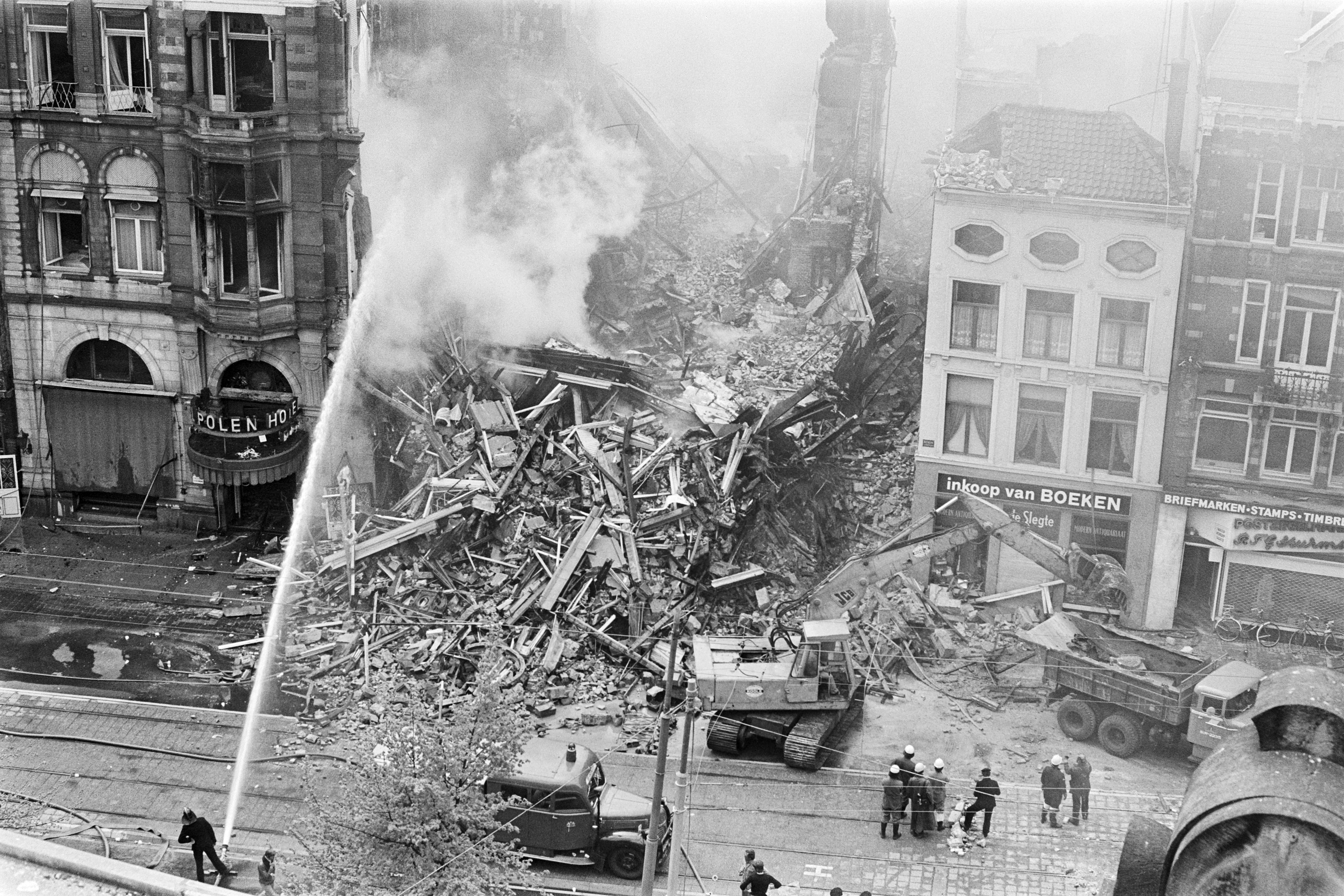
Firefighting on the Rokin side

On the night of Sunday 8 May to Monday 9 May 1977, about 100 people were staying in the Hotel Polen, including a large group of Swedish tourists. At about 6:20 am, the hotel staff were preparing for breakfast service when one of them noticed smoke that seemed to be coming from the freight elevator (which had not been used since the café-restaurant on the ground floor had closed the previous evening). The night porter was alerted. Contrary to instructions, he did not call the fire department immediately; instead, he poured some buckets of water into the shaft, in an attempt to subdue the fire. By the time he decided to call the fire department, the hotel was filling with smoke. He was unable to reach the phone at the front desk because the fire had already reached it; he then ran outside, where he stopped the driver of a laundry truck serving the hotel and instructed him to drive to the Hotel Krasnapolsky to warn them and to call the fire department.

By 6:30 am, the fire was spreading very quickly through the building, although from the outside nothing was visible. Because of the wooden construction, the building was soon engulfed in flames. The guests on the top level could not escape and stood panicked in the windows. When the fire reached some guests' rooms, they leapt out of the windows to escape. At 6:42 am, the first large fire engine arrived. On the street lay several dead and injured people who had jumped from their hotel room windows. On the lower floor, the furniture store Inden was also on fire. The fire fighters tried to unfold a life net in the Papenbroekssteeg, an alley which runs between the Rokin and the Kalverstraat, but it was too narrow.

At the front of the hotel, in the Rokin, rescue operations were also hampered. There were so many people standing on the window ledges screaming that the fire fighters did not know whom to save first. Time was also lost because some people threw their luggage into the life net and then jumped into it themselves, causing injuries. Some people fell to the side of the net and were severely injured. Just before 7:00 am, the part of the hotel facing the Kalverstraat collapsed. The burning debris landed on the fire engine there, and the fire fighters barely escaped to safety. The nearby book store was also burned out, and fires broke out in several buildings on the other side of the Kalverstraat; these were quickly brought under control.

At about 8:30 am, the wooden construction of the main part of the building also burned through and collapsed. Although there were still people in the building and more people were lying around the building severely injured, the fire fighters decided to withdraw. The smoking debris was extinguished, and at 9:30 am, the fire was declared under control. The building's collapse left a gaping hole; of the hotel, the furniture store and the bookstore, almost nothing remained.

Thirty-three people were killed: 32 tourists (17 of them Swedes) and the occupant of the apartment above the book store. Eighteen charred bodies were recovered from the debris. Thirteen people who had jumped from windows either died or were severely injured. Among the dead was the celebrated German concert musician and composer Walter Kraft, longtime organist of St. Mary's Church, Lübeck. Of the 57 people who were injured, 21 had severe injuries. Two guests from the United States escaped without injury.

== Possible cause ==
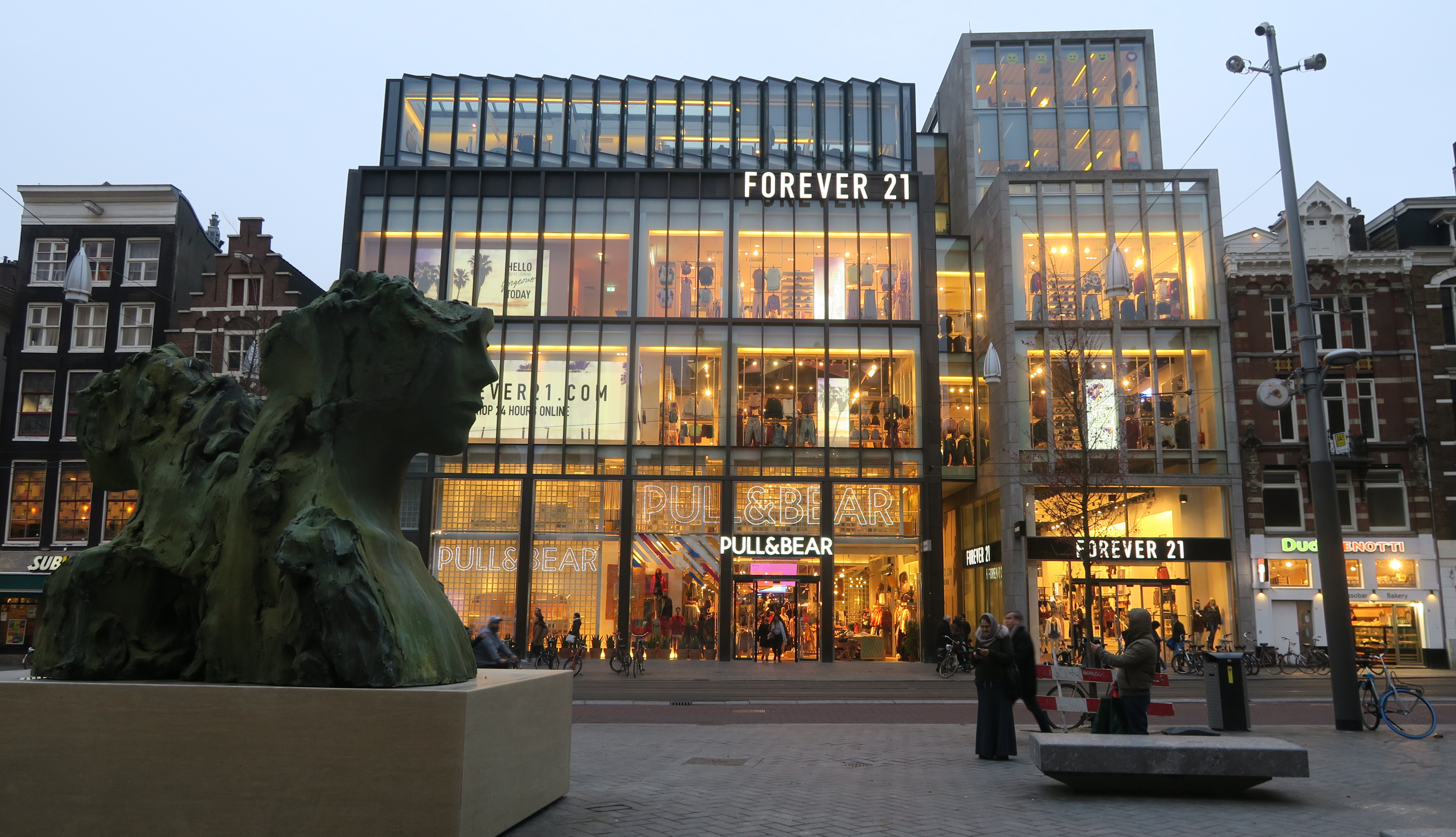
The Rokin Plaza which now stands at the former location of Hotel Polen

The cause of the fire could not be determined with certainty. One possibility is that a fire smouldered in the furniture store Inden under the hotel, and the opening of the elevator shaft in the morning provided an inflow of oxygen, causing the fire to spread. There is also a theory that the fire was set by burglars who tried to cover their tracks; however, there was no evidence of a burglary.

The high number of casualties was a consequence of the wooden construction of the building, the poorly marked escape routes and the shortage of safety equipment.

== Cultural impact ==
Polish-born artist Ania Bien produced a photographic art installation in 1986 called Hotel Polen. She fabricated 18 replicas of the hotel's menu stands and used them to display photographs alluding to the Holocaust. David Levi-Strauss wrote that Bien's art piece is a "polysemous work of absence, in which what happens between images is the most important" The work was displayed at the San Francisco Museum of Modern Art in 1987 and at the Amsterdams Historisch Museum in 1988.
