= Annemie Wolff =

German-Dutch photographer

Annemie Wolff-Koller
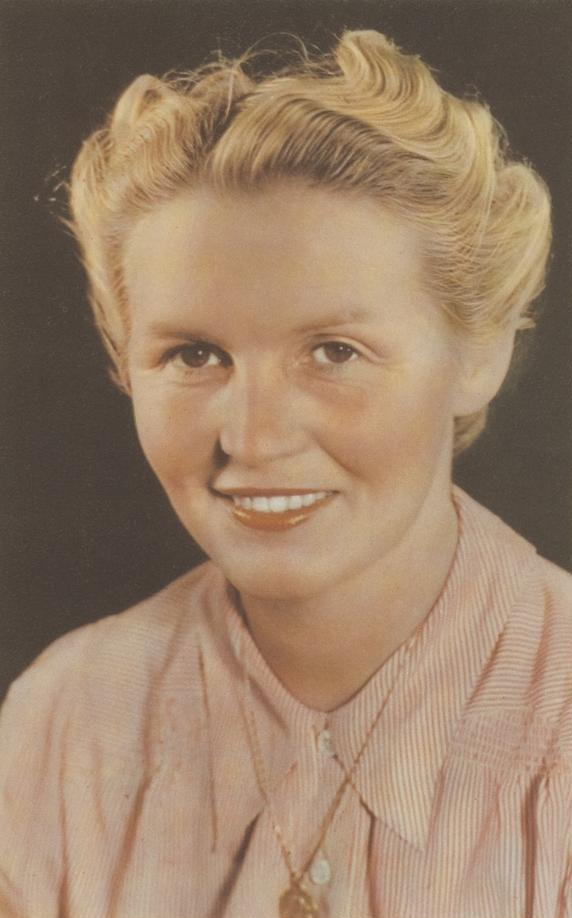
- Born: Anna Maria Koller; 27 December 1906; Laufen an der Salzach, Germany
- Died: 2 February 1994 (aged 87); Amsterdam, Netherlands
- Occupation: Photographer
- Spouse: Helmuth Wolff

Annemie Wolff, also known as Annemie Wolff-Koller, born as Anna Maria Koller (27 Dec 1906, Laufen an der Salzach - 2 Feb 1994, Amsterdam), was a German-Dutch photographer. Her 1943 photos of Jewish and non-Jewish children and adults, taken in Amsterdam, were rediscovered in 2008 by Dutch photo historian Simon Kool. About 3000 photos were taken of 440 persons, and about 300 of the subjects have been identified in November 2016. About 50% of the photos' Jewish subjects perished in the Nazi concentration camps, while the others survived World War II.

An exhibit of Wolff's photos opened on 26 Feb 2015 at the San Francisco Goethe Institute, co-sponsored by the Annemie and Helmuth Wolff Foundation, and the San Francisco Jewish Community Federation.

== Biography ==
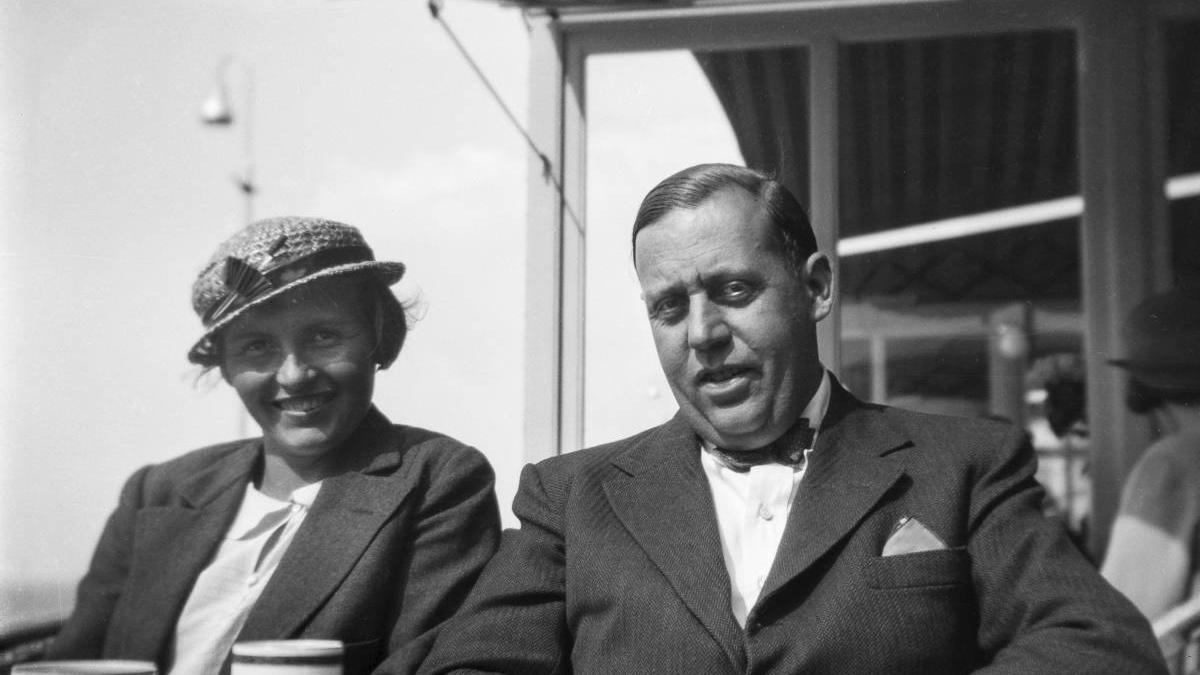
Annemie and Helmuth Wolff, 1930s

In 1933, Annemie Wolff and her husband, Jewish architect Helmuth Wolff, left Munich, Germany, and moved to Amsterdam.

They opened a photography studio in the Rivierenbuurt, an area of south Amsterdam where many German refugees settled. They founded photography magazine Kleinbeeldfoto, released several international photo stories and in 1939 organized an exhibit with pictures taken by subscribers to the magazine. Prince Bernhard was among the subscribers, presenting pictures of baby Princess Beatrix, later Queen of the Netherlands. Their main photography assignments came from the Amsterdam Port Authority and Schiphol Airport.

In May 1940, upon the Nazi invasion of the Netherlands, they attempted to carry out a suicide pact; Helmuth died but Annemie survived. In 1943, she continued her portrait work in her studio. After the war, she produced publicity photographs for the Amsterdam harbor and other clients. Later research by Dutch photo historian Simon Kool revealed that Annemie was a member of the Dutch resistance group De Ondergedoken Camera.

In her later years, however, she rarely spoke about her work during the war period.

== See also ==
- Dorothea Zucker-Franklin
- List of Dutch women photographers
