= Life net =

Type of rescue equipment formerly used by firefighters

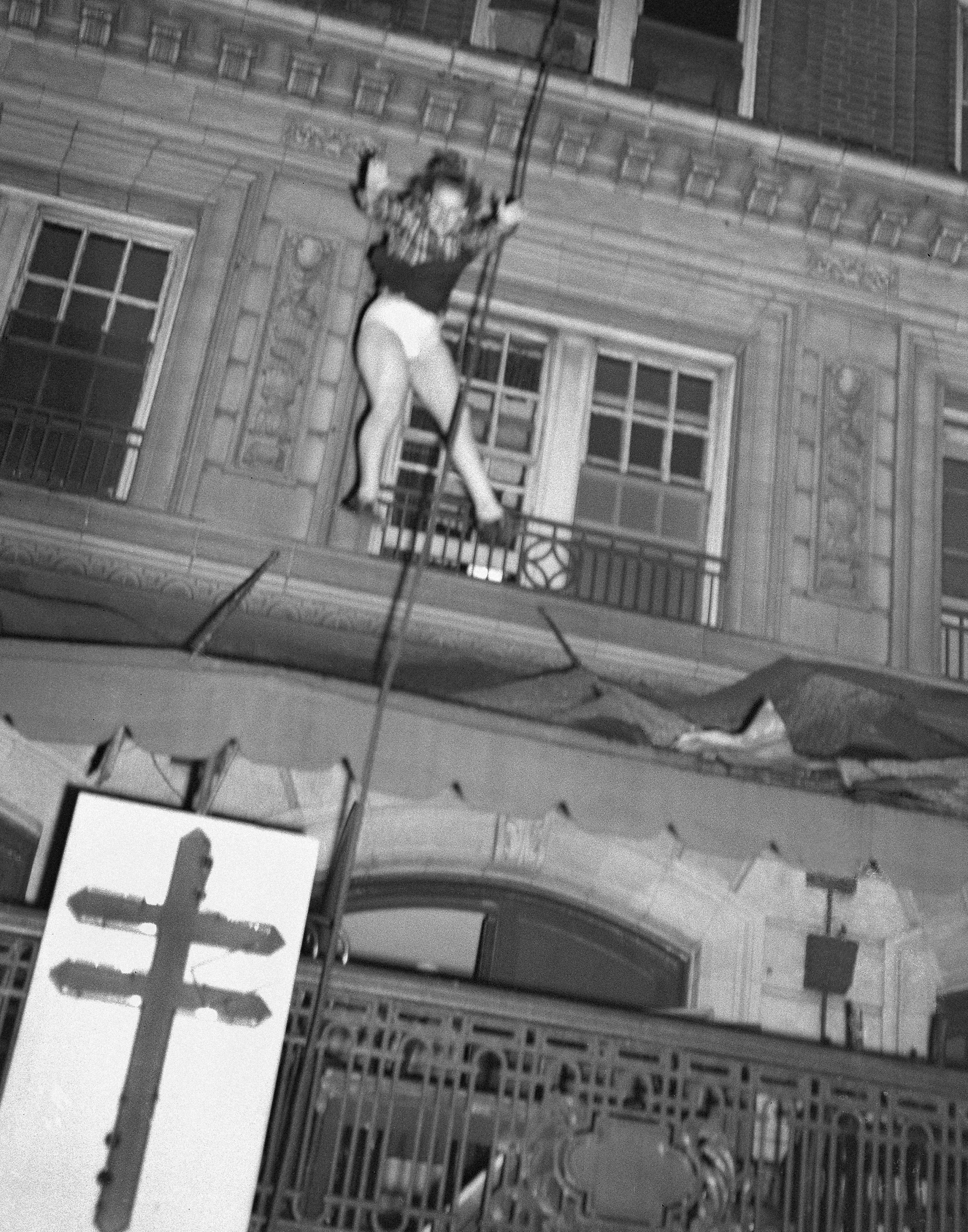
A woman jumping from her room during the Winecoff Hotel fire into a life net. This photo won a Pulitzer Prize in 1947. She survived with serious injuries.

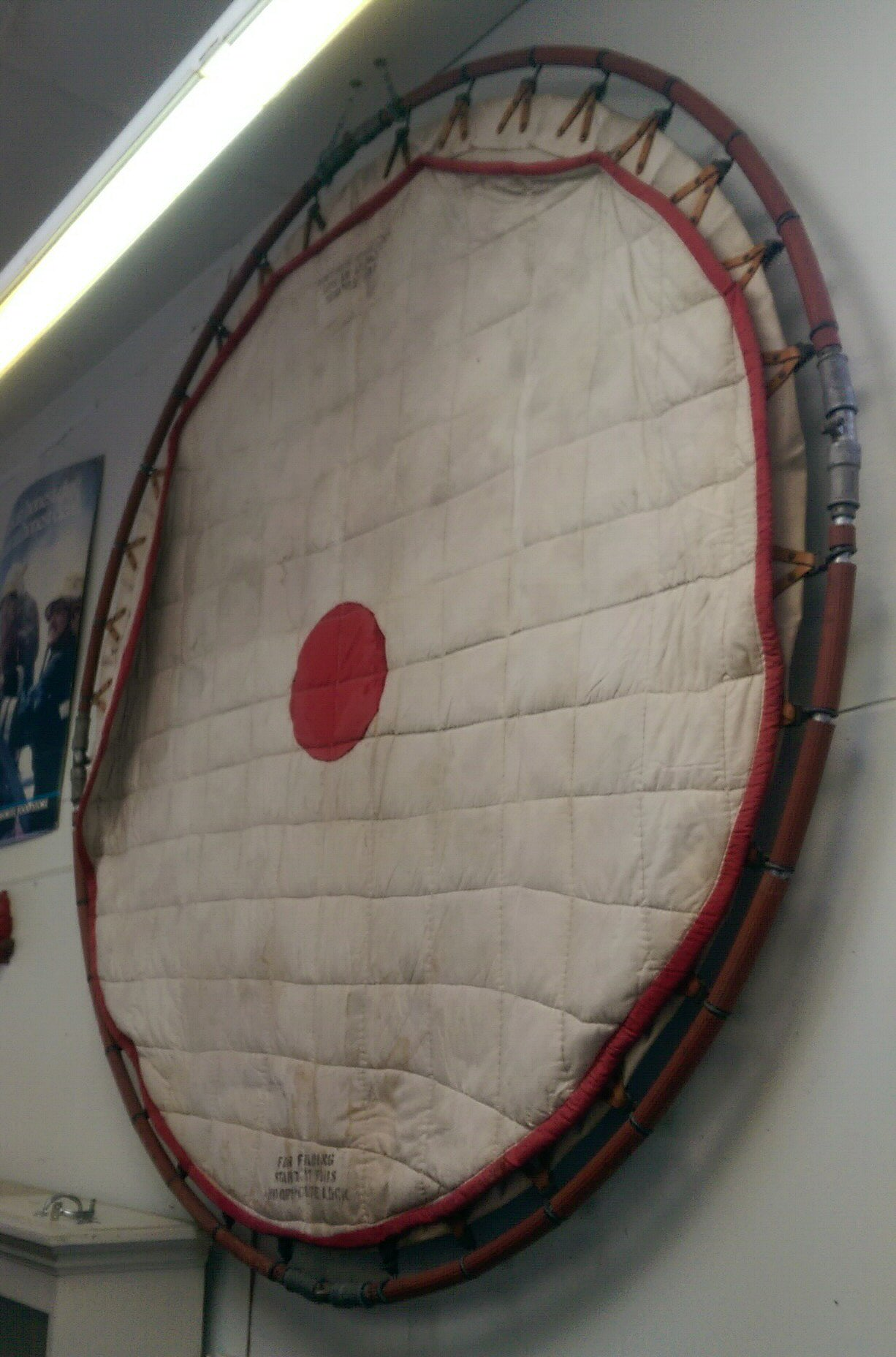
A life net on display at the Napa Firefighters Museum in Napa, California.

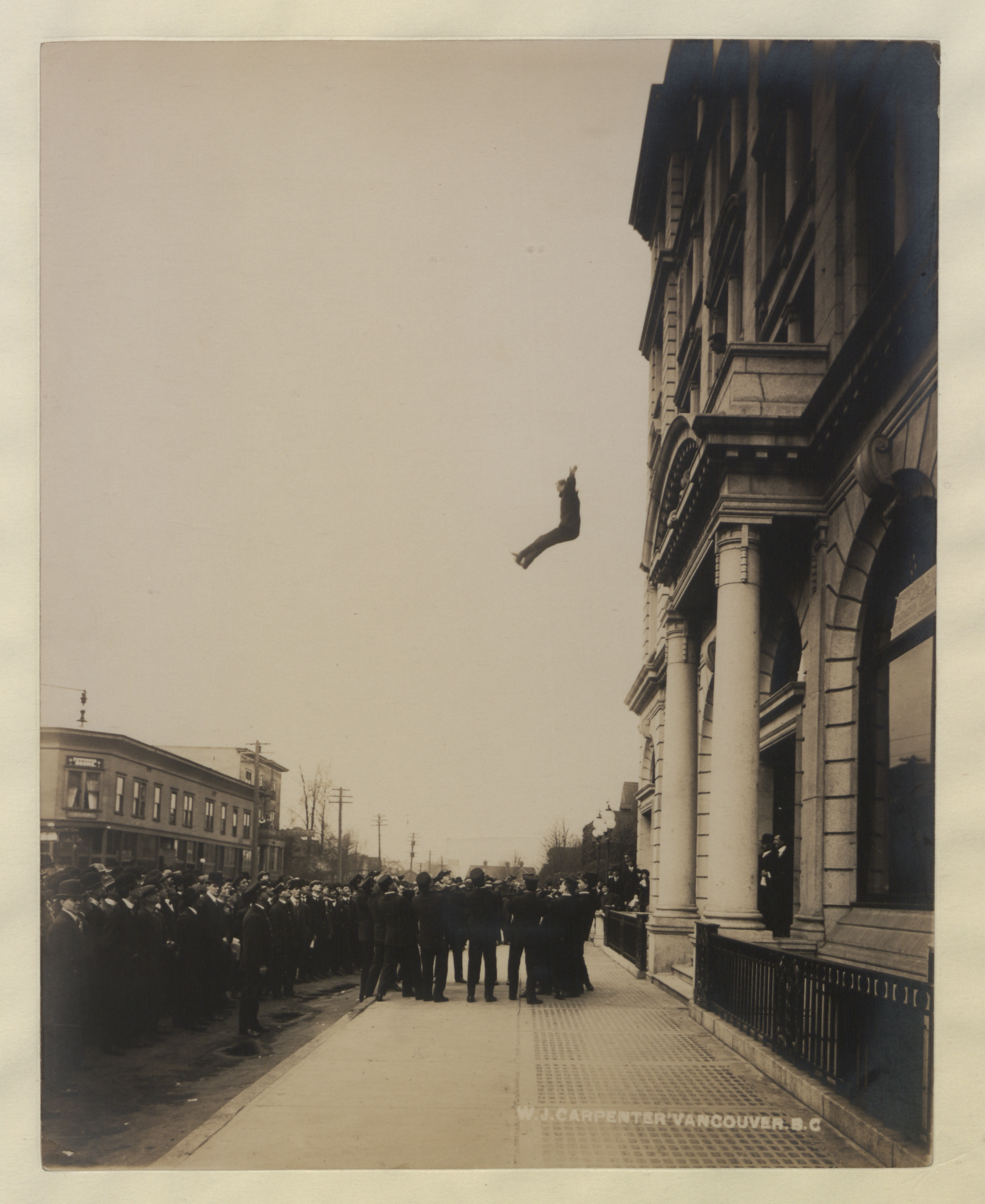
Vancouver fireman jumping into life net (1910)

A life net, also known as a Browder Life Safety Net or jumping sheet, is a type of rescue equipment formerly used by firefighters. When used in the proper conditions, it allowed people on upper floors of burning buildings an opportunity to jump to safety, usually to ground level. Invented in 1887, the device was used with varying degrees of success during several notable fires in the 20th century. Due to advances in firefighting technology, it became obsolete by the 1980s. Owing to their former prevalence, life nets often feature in popular culture as a running gag, especially in cartoons where they often appear in use during scenes where a fire is taking place.

== Inventor ==
The device was invented by Thomas F. Browder, born in Greene County, Ohio, in 1847. During the American Civil War, Browder enlisted in the Company C, 60th Ohio Infantry of the Union Army at the age of 17, and was wounded at the Battle of Spotsylvania Court House on May 9, 1864. He was shot through the hip, sent home the following month, and later discharged from the service. He became a school teacher, and later moved to Greenfield, Ohio, where he invented and patented the life net in 1887. Browder later opened a laundry business. He obtained additional patents for improvements to the life net in 1900, and later also patents in Europe.

== Design ==
Browder's device was similar to a modern recreational trampoline, which was developed later in 1936. Among its advantages were that the life net was always taut when open, never slackened, and had a setup time of only two to three seconds. It used hinges to fold for storage and an automatic locking mechanism when unfolded. Its opaque cover helped reduce panic and increase the confidence of people who had to jump into it. Some models had a red bullseye in the center.

== Limitations ==
Firefighters believed that the practical height limit for successful use of life nets was about six stories, although in a 1930 Chicago fire, three people survived jumps from an eighth story into a life net. One suffered a skull fracture, and the other two had minor injuries. In Newark, NJ in 1955, a would-be suicide was successfully caught in a life net after jumping from an eighth story window.

== Successful rescues ==
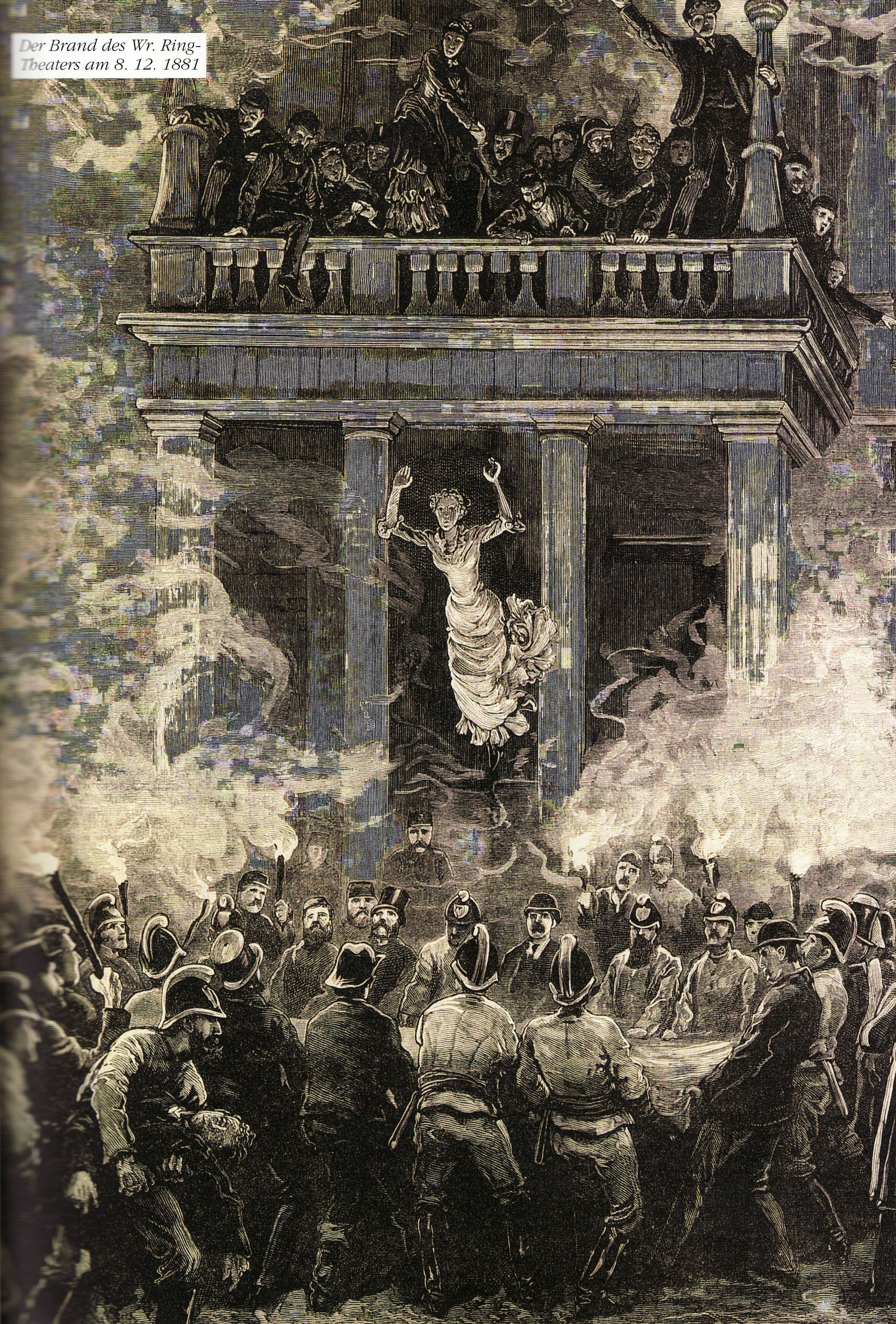
Life-net used in Ringtheater fire in Vienna December 8, 1881

On August 19, 1902, the New York City Fire Department conducted its first real-life rescue with the Browder life net. During rescue operations at a tenement fire that killed five people, a baby was dropped from a fourth-floor fire escape into a life net, and survived uninjured. On November 10, 1904, three people were saved when they jumped into a life net during a fire in New York City. Three other people died on the top floor of the building. In Anchorage, Alaska, in January 1957, a woman dropped her three-year-old daughter into a life net, and the girl was uninjured; the mother suffered a broken back after jumping into the net.

The most intensive use of life nets was conducted in a large scale operation by the Berlin fire brigade during and right after construction of the Berlin Wall in 1961, when a large number of people jumped from houses in the Soviet sector onto the life nets of the West Berlin fire brigade on the pavement that was part of the western sector of Berlin.

== Failures and problems ==
Life nets often failed to save people, and sometimes firefighters themselves were injured or killed by falling bodies. According to researcher and writer Cecil Adams, "Leapers sometimes struck something on the way down, landed on a fireman, or missed entirely." In November 1910, a fire swept through a factory in Newark, New Jersey, killing 25 people. Among them were four girls who held onto each other when they jumped into a life net. They tore the net apart and were killed. In the Triangle Shirtwaist Factory fire on March 25, 1911, girls jumped into life nets from the ninth floor with their arms intertwined and the impact ripped the canvas and tore the springs from the frame, resulting in their deaths. In all, 146 garment workers were killed in that fire. During the Hotel Polen fire in Amsterdam on May 9, 1977, firefighters could not successfully deploy a life net in a narrow, congested alley. When a life net was deployed in a more open area, some hotel guests threw their luggage into the net, and were then injured when they jumped. Others were injured when they hit the rim of the net. In all, 33 people died in that fire.

== Phase out ==
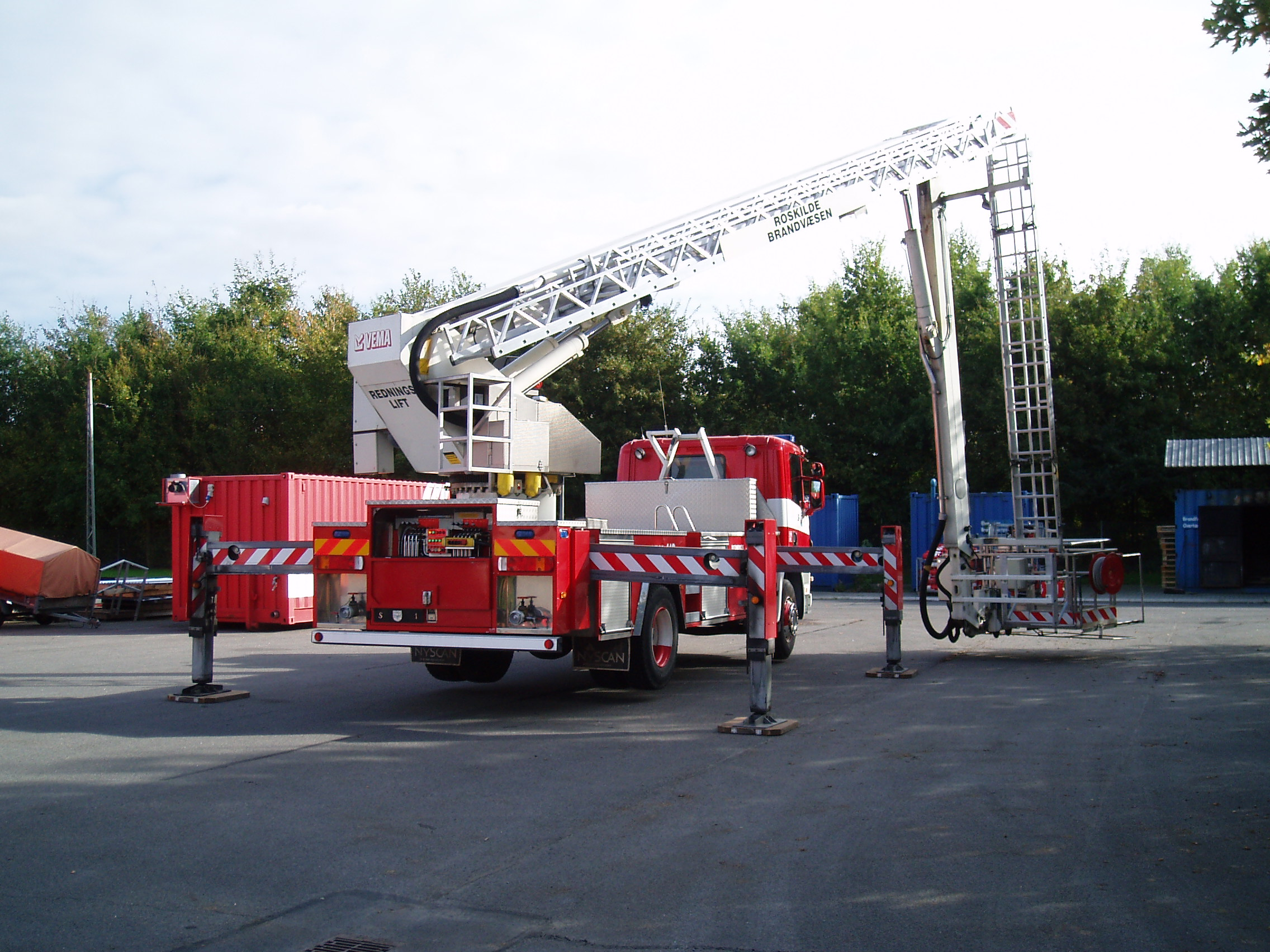
Telescopic hydraulic platform in Roskilde, Denmark (2007)

In 1958, a fire department official in Eugene, Oregon expressed reservations, saying that the term "life net" was misleading, and that they should be used only as a last resort. As late as 1961, though, the Chicago Fire Department still emphasized the life net in its training programs. However, the modern aerial apparatus (a type of aerial work platform) often known as a ladder truck has made the life net obsolete, as this ladder equipment makes it possible for firefighters to carry out rescues more safely, at greater heights and with smaller crews. Another piece of equipment, which started to phase out the life net (especially in European countries, such as Austria and Germany) is the inflatable jumping cushion, which absorbs the energy of a person due to the air inside the cushion being forced out by the impact. Adams has concluded that the life net was no longer mentioned after 1983, and writes that they are not discussed in current training manuals for firefighters. Many examples of life nets are on display in firefighting historical museums.
