= Vali Myers =

Australian artist, dancer, bohemian and muse

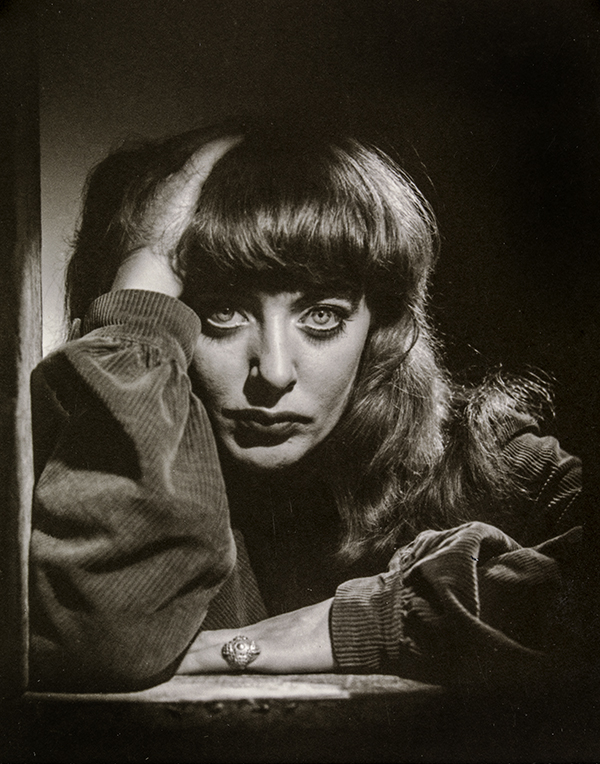
- Vali Myers photographed by Norman Ikin in c.1959 in Wolfgang Sievers studio in Collins Street Melbourne
- Born: 2 August 1930; Canterbury, Sydney, Australia
- Died: 12 February 2003 (aged 72); Melbourne, Australia

Vali Myers (2 August 1930 – 12 February 2003) was an Australian artist, dancer, bohemian and muse whose coverage by the media was mostly in the 1950s and 1960s in Europe and the United States.

== Early life ==
Myers was born in Canterbury, Sydney, on 2 August 1930, to a violinist mother and marine wireless operator father. She displayed a talent for art at an early age. The family moved to Box Hill, Melbourne in 1941 and Myers left home at 14.

After working in factories to support her dance lessons, she became immersed in dance and later became the leading dancer for the Melbourne Modern Ballet Company. In 1949 at age 19 Myers travelled to impoverished post-war Paris to pursue a dance career but found herself living on the streets of the Saint-Germain-des-Prés Quarter on the Left Bank. Love on the Left Bank is a 1954 book of photographs by Dutch photographer Ed van der Elsken (1925–1990), documenting the bohemian life on the Rive Gauche of Paris; Myers is the heroine of this semi-biographical roman à clef, and is also photographed along with some of her early drawings.

== Career ==
Myers was a flamboyant fantasy artist who worked in pen and ink and watercolour as well as being a nightclub dancer. She divided her life between her adopted home of Melbourne, the Hotel Chelsea in New York City, a 14th-century cottage at Il Porto, near Positano and a residence in Paris.

Her art works developed from early detailed monochromes to a full range of vibrant colours and tones extending to watercolour and gold leaf, displaying a "fastidiously rendered depiction of a personal spirit world". She was acquainted with many celebrities including Tennessee Williams, Salvador Dalí, Django Reinhardt, Jean Cocteau, Patti Smith, Jean Genet and Sam Shepard.

Myers' paintings have sold for up to $US40,000 ($A68,000) in New York. Her work was held in the Stuyvesant collection in the Netherlands, New York's Hurryman Collection, and is owned by private collectors such as George Plimpton and Mick Jagger.

== Personal life ==
While in Europe she married Rudi Rappold, an Austrian from Vienna, and moved to Positano. The marriage ended, and later her lover, Italian artist Gianni Menichetti moved in and helped turn the property into a wildlife sanctuary that was endorsed by the World Wildlife Fund.

Later, after she began having seizures, she returned to Melbourne in 1993, and opened a studio in the Nicholas Building; only returning to Positano occasionally.

== Death ==
Vali Myers died in Melbourne on 12 February 2003 shortly after being diagnosed with cancer at the age of 72.

On 18 January 2003, a month before Myers' death, The Age newspaper printed an article about her life. The article concluded with the following quote from Myers:

I've had 72 absolutely flaming years. It [the illness] doesn't bother me at all, because, you know, love, when you've lived like I have, you've done it all. I put all my effort into living; any dope can drop dead. I'm in the hospital now, and I guess I'll kick the bucket here. Every beetle does it, every bird, everybody. You come into the world and then you go.

== LUMA ==
An exhibition of her work was held at LUMA (La Trobe University Museum of Art) in 2013. The show, Between Dusk and Dawn was a personal retrospective that included works from private collections in the US and Europe and ran in September and October.

== Books ==
- Myers, Vali, 1930–2003 Drawings 1949–79 / Vali Myers. London : Open House, 1980 : ISBN 0-905664-25-6
- Macintosh, M. & Jones, G. (ed), "Night Flower: The Life and Art of Vali Myers" Melbourne : Outre Gallery Press, 2012 : ISBN 978-0-9751078-9-8
- Menichetti, Gianni, Vali Myers Memoirs Fresno, CA : Golda Foundation, 2006 : ISBN 0-9785606-0-4
- Van Der Elsken, Ed, Love on the Left Bank Amsterdam : Bezige Bij, 1956 : ISBN 978-1-899235-22-3

== Filmography ==
- Vali, The Witch of Positano – 1965. A film by Sheldon and Diane Rochlin, co-Produced by George Plimpton. Winner, Documentary Film Category, 1965 Mannheim Film Festival. (Duration: 65 minutes)
- The Invasion of Thunderbolt Pagoda – 1968. Experimental film by Ira Cohen. (Duration: 22 minutes)
- Dope – 1968. A film by Sheldon and Diane Rochlin. A documentary about a young London woman's drug addiction in the late 1960s. Vali Myers appears in scenes throughout the documentary.
- Death in Port Jackson Hotel – 1971. A film by Ed van der Elsken. Features Vali in her "savage paradise", Il Porto, the canyon near Positano where she created her artwork. (Duration: 36 minutes)
- Patti and Vali – 1973. A short film/documentary by Sandra Dailey. The film shows Patti Smith having her knee cap tattooed by Vali, and also features an off screen commentary by Smith. (Duration: 30 minutes)
- Vali's World 1984. Telltales Video Documentary by Fred Cushing & Caterine Milinaire ( 55 minutes)
- Vali: The Tightrope Dancer – 1989. A documentary by Australian film-maker Ruth Cullen. (Duration: 58 minutes)
- Painted Lady – 2002. Ruth Cullen's follow up to The Tightrope Dancer, a documentary that follows Vali at her studio and with friends like Lee Fuhler. (Duration: 27 minutes)

== Legacy ==
- Vali Myers was a huge inspiration to the young Patti Smith, whose walls were covered in pictures of and by Vali Myers. When they met in New York, Vali tattooed Patti with a lightning bolt on her knee cap. This was filmed by Sandra Dailey who also filmed the infamous piercing of Robert Mapplethorpe's nipple.
- Vali was the inspiration behind the character of Carol in Tennessee Williams' play Orpheus Descending.
- Vali is also mentioned in Marianne Faithfull's 1994 autobiography Faithfull.
- The song "Ballerina Valerie" by Joni Mitchell is about Vali.
- British singer Florence Welch stated that Vali was a big influence for Florence and The Machine's third studio album, How Big How Blue How Beautiful.
- Vali Myers was the inspiration of the Ching Ho Cheng painting "Queenie" which is in the permanent collection at the Cleveland Museum of Art.

== Sources ==
- Smith, Bernard; Terry Smith; Christopher Heathcote (2001). Australian Painting 1788–2000. Melbourne, Vic: Oxford University Press. p. 630p. ISBN 0-19-551554-4.
- Obituary by Clayton Patterson from Skin and Ink magazine, 2004
- Information on the relationship between Vali Myers and Patti Smith
- Vali Myers official website administrated by the Vali Myers Art Gallery Trust in Australia
- Director Ruth Cullen's official website
- Work with poet Lee Fuhler
- Official Website of Ed van der Elsken
- Ching Ho Cheng, Official Website: Cleveland Museum of Art
