= Margriet Smulders =

Dutch photographer of floral still lifes (born 1955)

Margriet Smulders (born 1955) is a Dutch photographer of floral still lifes. She attended the Radboud University Nijmegen from 1974 to 1983 and the Academy of Arts in Arnhem from 1979 to 1985.

== Work ==
She has worked on an ongoing series of floral still life photographs.

== Publications ==
=== Publications by Smulders ===
- Margriet Smulders fotografeert de Katholieke Universiteit in 75 Portretten. Uitgeverij Katholieke Universiteit Nijmegen. With texts by Johan van de Woestijne, Flip Bool and Wim Bronzwaar.
- Sirene, Verlangen en verleiding = Siren, Desire and Seduction. Liempde: Kempen, 2002. Text by Pietje Tegenbosch.
- Get drunk. Self-published, 2006. With an essay by Robbert Roos and a preface by Danielle Lokin.
- Margriet Smulders. D'jonge Hond, 2010. With a preface by Frank van de Schoor and texts by Wouter Kloek, Marina Aarts, Laila Tijabi, Francis Wells, Marjoleine de Vos, Yvonne Benschop, Prakash Chhangani, Jan Derksen, Ellen Harris, Matthias Harder, Brigitte Lardinois, Matthijs Schouten, and Johan van de Woestijne.
- Holy Disorders. With a text by Cornel Bierens.

=== Publication with contribution by Smulders ===
- What Makes Great Photography: 80 Masterpieces explained. Text by Val Williams. Apple Press, 2012.
