= Ania Bien =

Polish-American photographer (born 1946)

- Born: 1946 (age 78–79); Kraków, Poland
- Occupation: Photographer

Ania Bien (born 1946) is an American photographer. Born in Kraków, Poland, to Polish-Jewish parents, she moved to the United States in 1958, where she studied painting and cultural anthropology. Since 1973 she has lived in Amsterdam.

== Works ==
One of Bien's early projects, Hotel Polen, referred to the Hotel Polen fire (which became "part of Bien's wider theme of destruction") in Amsterdam, 1977, and established her reputation in Dutch art circles. The collection of photographs illustrated a hotel before World War II, showcasing the relative luxury of middle-class travel in Europe, but objects in the photographs associated with the Holocaust indicate that this was a "doomed" way of life. She fabricated 18 replicas of the hotel's menu stands, and used them to display the photographs; the purposely large panels could not be examined en masse, requiring observers to move from image to image. David Levi Strauss, writing in a chapter focusing on Bien in his 2003 book Between the Eyes: Essays on Photography and Politics, called the art piece a "polysemous work of absence, in which what happens between images is the most important." The work was displayed at the San Francisco Museum of Modern Art in 1987 and at the Amsterdams Historisch Museum in 1988.

Some of Bien's work is concerned with Franz Kafka; one of her photographs has her place her hand on a portrait of Kafka's, in response to a note he wrote in 1924 to Dora Diamant, "Place your hand on my forehead for a moment, so I can gain courage." Her 1989 installation Past Perfect asked "what would have happened had [Kafka] not died in 1924, but instead had come as a refugee to America in the late '30s." It gained her international recognition, and was also shown in Jerusalem.

Bien is interested in war, discrimination, and the plight of refugees. She contributed photographs from a centre for asylum seekers in Haarlem to a 1994 book on refugee children in such centers in the Netherlands, Ontheemde kinderen.

Bien has also exhibited at Portfolio Gallery in Edinburgh, Scotland, and the Joods Historisch Museum in Amsterdam.
