= Lucie Blachet =

Dutch photographer (1828–1907)

Lucie Blachet (1828–1907), was a Dutch photographer. She was one of the first female photographers in the Netherlands.

== Life and work ==
Blachet was born in Saint-Mandé, the illegitimate daughter of 18-year-old Lucie Françoise Blachet, a Cirque Olympique rider. She later lived in Paris, where she may have met her husband-to-be. In 1850 she married the Dutch painter Jacobus van Koningsveld (1824-1866) in Amsterdam. Her husband opened a photography studio in The Hague in 1859.

After the death of Van Koningsveld in 1866, Blachet continued the business under the name Veuve J. van Koningsveld, initially in The Hague and Scheveningen, and from 1868 in Deventer. She was assisted in this by Gerrit Jan van Koningsveld (1844-1922), probably an uncle of her husband. He managed the studio in Scheveningen until 1873 and then moved to Deventer. In 1891 Blachet and Van Koningsveld moved to Brummen, where she died in 1907 at the age of 78.

== Works in public collections (selection) ==
- Rijksmuseum Amsterdam
