= Ata Kandó =

Dutch photographer (1913–2017)

- Self-portrait, Paris (1935-1937); Dutch Photo Museum
- Born: Etelka Görög; 17 September 1913; Budapest, Austria-Hungary
- Died: 14 September 2017 (aged 103); Bergen, Netherlands
- Other names: Etelka Görög Etelka Kandó; Etelka van der Elsken
- Occupations: Photographer, humanitarian
- Spouse(s): Gyula Kandó (1908-1968)(m. 1931, div. ca. 1950); Ed van der Elsken (m. 1954, div. 1955)
- Children: 3

Ata Kandó (born Etelka Görög; 17 September 1913 – 14 September 2017) was a Hungarian-born Dutch photographer. Beginning her photography practice in the 1930s with children's photography, Kandó later worked as a fashion photographer, photographed refugees and travelled to the Amazon to photograph landscapes and indigenous people.

In 1959, she won a silver medal in Munich for fashion photography and then in 1991, received the Pro Cultura Hungarica Medal; this was followed in 1998 with the Imre Nagy Prize and that same year, she and her husband received the Righteous Among the Nations, awarded by Israel for saving Jews during the Holocaust. In 1999 she was awarded the Hungarian Photographers Association Lifetime Achievement Award.

== Early life ==
Etelka Görög was born on 17 September 1913 to a family of Hungarian Jewish descent in Budapest to Margit (née Beke) and Imre Görög. Her father was a high school teacher and translator of Russian literature. He had been a prisoner of war in Russia during the First World War. Her mother translated Scandinavian literature into Hungarian and spoke five languages. Etelka's maternal grandfather Manó Beke (Hungarian style: Beke Manó), was a noted mathematician.

When she learned to talk, Etelka was unable to pronounce her own name and called herself Ata, which she continued to use into adulthood. Her parents encouraged their daughter in pursuing an artistic profession. She liked drawing and was enrolled in the Sándor Bortnyik private academy. Other students included the artists Victor Vasarely (Vásárhelyi Győző) and Gyula Kandó (Kandó Gyula). She and Gyula wed in 1931 and moved to Paris, but, due to financial difficulties, the couple returned to Budapest in 1935. Changing her studies to photography, Kandó began studying with Klára Wachter and Mariann Reismann and then completed an apprenticeship with Ferenc Haár. She completed her exams studying under József Pécsi.

== Career ==
Kandó and her husband returned to Paris in 1938 and she opened a photography studio between the Louvre and the Palais Garnier with Ferenc Haár's wife. Primarily focusing on children's photography, the business began growing, but in 1940 the German invasion of Paris forced the couple's deportation and return to Hungary. In 1941, Kandó had a son, Tamás, and two years later gave birth to twin daughters, Júlia and Magdolna. Her parents and sister were forced into hiding due to their Jewish heritage, however, as Kandó's husband was not Jewish and the Aryan Spouse Act of Hungary gave her a measure of protection, Kandó was able to move about freely.

Both she and her husband worked for the resistance during World War II, housing fourteen Jews in their home. In another case, Kandó gave her identity papers to Bíró Gábor (Gábor Bíró), a pregnant Jewish woman, so that she could enter a Christian maternity hospital to have her baby. After the birth, Kandó pretended the child was her own and provided forged identity papers so that the woman could act as a wet nurse for her own child. Moving multiple times, the Kandó–Bíró household managed to remain undetected until the war ended. Both Kandó and her husband were honored with the Righteous Among the Nations from the State of Israel for assisting Jews during the Holocaust in 1998.

In 1947, the family returned to Paris and Kandó resumed her photography career with a camera she received from Robert Capa after her own was lost. Capa also hired her to work at Magnum Photos laboratory where she remained until 1952. Unable to find work in Paris, her husband returned to Hungary in 1949 to seek work so the family could join him, but in late 1949 the Iron Curtain's establishment meant that the family was unable to reunite. Shortly thereafter, Kandó and her husband separated and she fell in love with a 25-year-old Dutch photographer, Ed van der Elsken. The couple lived together for four years before marrying in 1954 and moving to the Netherlands. Less than a year later, however, they divorced and she found herself alone in a foreign country with three children. Turning to fashion photography, she took pictures for well-known Dutch and French fashion houses and travelled with her children making photo shoots throughout the Alps.

In 1956, Kandó traveled to the Austrian–Hungarian border during the Hungarian Revolution. She wanted to take pictures of the refugees but could not convince any other photographers to go with her. When the Bound Arts Federation (Dutch: Gebonden Kunsten Federatie (GKf)) supported the trip and De Bezige Bij agreed to publish the works, Violette Cornelius joined her. The two women flew to Vienna and took photographs of refugee children, stipulating that the proceeds of the sale go to assist the refugees.

The untitled book was called The Red Book due to its colour, was shot over three weeks so that it could be released by Christmas. Sales raised over a quarter of a million dollars. The following year, Kandó published a book called Droom in het woud (Dream in the forest), which featured the holiday trips she had taken in Switzerland and Austria with her children. Her son, Tamás, who was fourteen, wrote the texts to accompany the dream-like images. Several bookstores in the Netherlands refused to sell the book, on the grounds that the dream sequences were too erotic. Kandó returned to fashion photography and obtained a teaching post at a Dutch secondary school. In 1959, she won a silver medal from Munich for the best fashion photograph of the year and began working at the Dutch Academy of Arts and Design and Graphic Arts in Utrecht.

In 1961, through a fashion model, Barbara Brandli, who was also working as an assistant to the architect Le Corbusier, Kandó was invited to visit Caracas. She photographed Brandli in the jungle and through contact with a French priest was able to fly to the interior and take images of some of the native indigenous people. She returned again in 1965 taking more photographs of the Amazon landscape and people. She was also able to take photographs of Peruvian whalers during the second trip. The South American photographs were featured in National Geographic and some images were purchased by the British Museum and private collectors. In 1970, some of them were published in a book called A Hold véréből.

In 1979, Kandó moved to Sacramento, California to be near her son, now known as Thomas. She continued working and publishing photographs from the United States for a decade. Her work was increasingly recognized during this time. She received Pro Cultura Hungarica Medal in 1991. In 1998, Kandó was awarded the Imre Nagy Prize . That same year, she and her former husband received the Righteous Among the Nations, awarded by Israel for saving Jews during the Holocaust. In 1999 she was awarded the Hungarian Photographers Association Lifetime Achievement Award.

== Later career ==
In 1999, Kandó moved to the Isle of Wight in the United Kingdom to be near one of her daughters and then in 2001 returned to the Netherlands, settling in Bergen. In 2003, she published a second collection of the photographs taken of her children on their holidays between 1954 and 1955. The book had originally been planned for publication as a sequel to Droom in het woud, but because of the poor reception of Droom in 1957, Kandó did not publish at that time. The book, was originally planned to be named Ulysses, but was renamed in 2003 and published as Kalypso & Nausikaä – Foto's naar Homerus Odyssee.

In 2004, in celebration of her 90th birthday, photographs from the "Red Book" were shown in the Netherlands. Two years later, Kandó held an exhibition of works in conjunction with the Hungarian Embassy in Berlin in 2006, which also featured were photographs taken in 1956 of refugee children. In 2013, in conjunction with her 100th birthday, an English and Hungarian translation of Dream in the Forest was released and the Hungarian Museum of Photography held a two-month exhibition featuring her works. The Dutch Photo Museum held an exhibition in 2014 of her work, along with portraits made by other photographers.

== Death and legacy ==
Kandó died three days before her 104th birthday on 14 September 2017.
