= Violette Cornelius =

20th century Dutch photographer

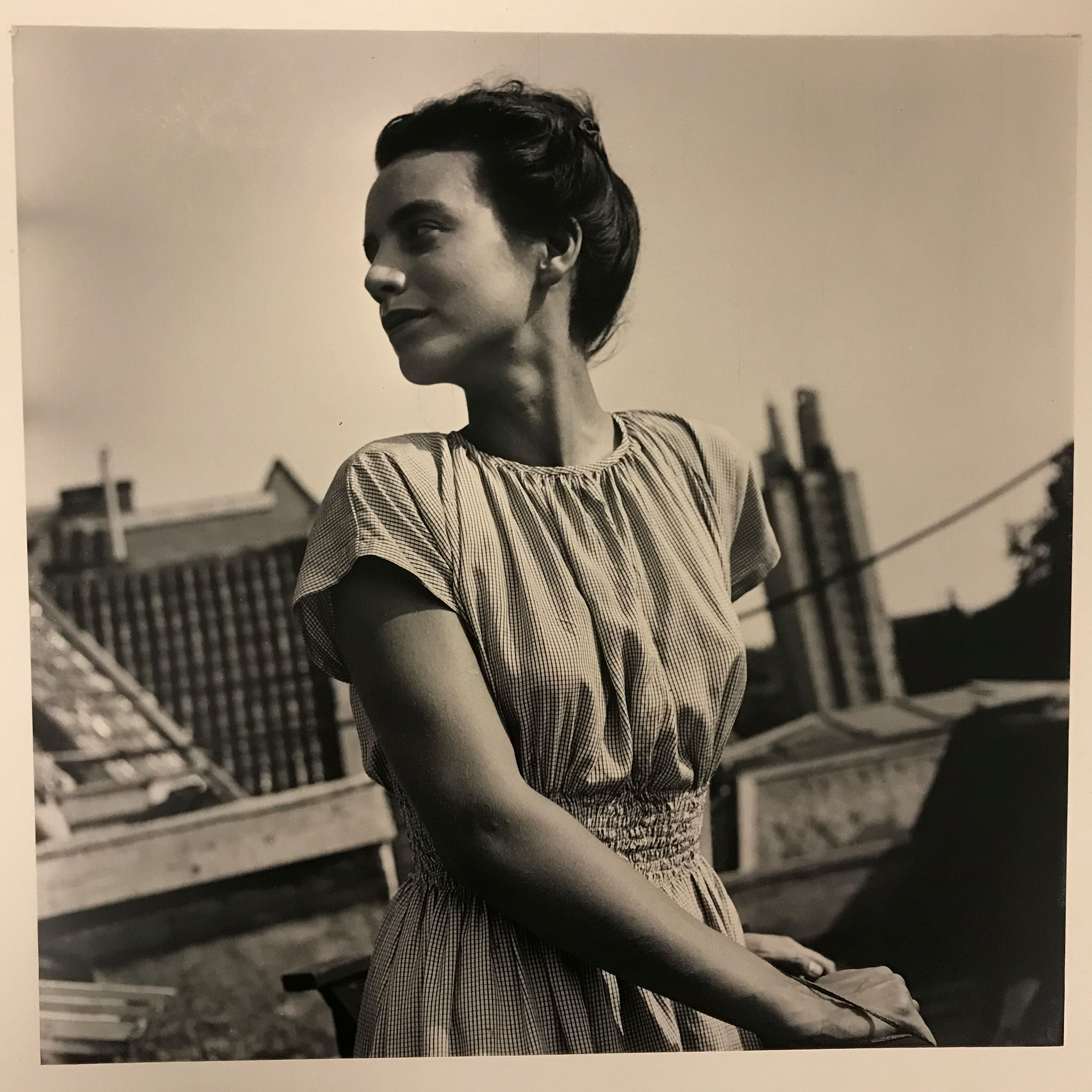
Cornelius (1938)

Violette Cornelius (17 March 1919, Batavia, Dutch East Indies – 23 January 1998, Saint-Maximin, France) was a Dutch photographer and resistance fighter during World War II. During the war, she joined an artist's resistance group and contributed to clandestine magazines.

After the war, she specialized in architectural photography. She collaborated on many business photo books, including one about Hoogovens IJmuiden with Cas Oorthuys and others. In 1957 she made a book about the city of Weesp together with the author Jan Elburg. She then went, often with colleague Sean Wellesley Miller, capturing the migration to urban areas in developing countries. Later, she published reportages about Iraq, India, Peru, Yemen, and some countries in Africa. She worked with Ata Kandó in 1956 to document the situation of Hungarian refugees travelling to Austria. A major retrospective of her work runs November 20, 2026 to February 28, 2027.
