= HJIM van Gasteren =

Dutch multimedia artist

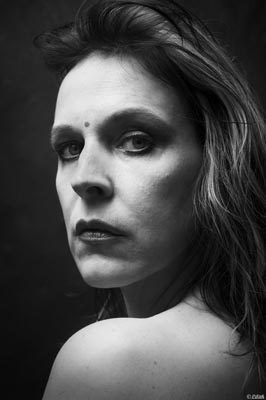
- Born: 9 September 1964 (age 61); Sevenum, Netherlands
- Known for: Photography

HJIM van Gasteren is the pseudonym of Henriëtte Johanna Ignatia Maria van Gasteren (born 9 September 1964 in Sevenum), a Dutch multimedia artist known for her often controversial self-portraits. Formerly known as Lilith Love, she changed her artist name in 2020. Her work frequently explores themes such as identity, femininity, female archetypes, gender bending, freedom and equality.

== Early life ==
Henriëtte is the youngest in of four siblings. Her father worked as a clog maker and mailman. From a young age, she has been writing, drawing and cooking. She attended the Schoevers Academy in Nijmegen and worked as an executive secretary from 1983 till 2000.

== Transition to photographer ==
In 2005, Henriëtte resumed writing, and her culinary erotic story Kalfsbraadstuk op tagliatelle met een zachte saus van witte port en kaas (Veal roast on tagliatelle with a smooth sauce of white port and cheese) was published in: Raadselige Roos 2005, a collection of stories from a regional literally competition for the Venray-region. To illustrate her online blogs, she began creating self-portraits initially using a webcam, and later a simple compact camera. By 2006, her self-portraits had nearly replaced her written stories, she and she began using a single-lens reflex camera, tripod and remote control to document her life through photographs

== Controversy ==
Henriëtte's work has often sparked controversy. She has also been censored during an exhibition in the Euregio-Haus in Mönchengladbach, Germany and during an exhibition in the convention center (and former seminary) Rolduc in Kerkrade, The Netherlands. Her self-portrait Forgive me, Father, for... from the religious series I could’ve had religion made the front page of the Dutch newspaper Sp!ts because of it.

In 2012 she was one of the ten leading artists from Limburg who were exhibited at the Pulchri Studio in The Hague, together with Ted Noten, Charles Eyck and Lei Molin. In the same year her work was also shown in the US for the first time. During Photoville in Brooklyn Bridge Park, New York City her work could be seen at two exhibitions: The Wonder of Woman and FotoFestival Naarden.

== Photo documentary ==
In 2012 she started her project A house is not a home, in which the houses of complete strangers are the setting for her self-portraits. That same year she also started the photo documentary Risja, a story by Lilith - This is bugging me, about Risja Steeghs a girl who lives in her village and who suffers from a severe form of Lyme disease. The 'Huis voor de Kunsten Limburg' in Roermond, The Netherlands, financially supported the travelling exhibition and the publication of a photo book with the same name. The proceeds from the book sales go to TeekOnMe, a foundation that supports the research of Lyme disease.

== Private ==
Partner Henk Temming.

== Books ==
- 2012: Risja, a story by Lilith - This is bugging me ISBN 978-90-819714-0-9
- 2013: A house is not a home ISBN 978-90-819714-1-6
- 2015: Over hoeren & madonna’s (met sonnetten van Paul Sterk) ISBN 978-90-6216-963-4
- 2016: Skinny dipping ISBN 978-90-819714-2-3
- 2020: HJIM, Greatest hits ISBN 978-90-819714-3-0
- 2024: Silent Scream ISBN 978-90-819714-4-7

== Museums ==
- Museum van Bommel van Dam (Dutch), Venlo NL
- Museum for modern art IKOB (Dutch), Eupen B
- Limburgs Museum (Dutch), Venlo NL
- Gemeentemuseum W: (dutch), Weert NL
- CODA museum (Dutch), Apeldoorn NL
- Joods Cultureel Kwartier (Dutch), Amsterdam NL
- w:nl:Fotomuseum aan het Vrijthof, Maastricht NL
- Museum Aktfotoart Dresden (German), Dresden DE
