= Maria Hille =

Dutch photographer (1827–1893)

Maria Elisabeth Hille (1827–1893), was a Dutch photographer. She was the first professional female photographer in the Netherlands.

She managed a studio where she worked alongside her spouse in Groningen in 1853 (from 1857 in The Hague). She took over the business formally when she was widowed in 1863.
