= Cancer rehabilitation =

Cancer Remedy

Cancer rehabilitation has been defined in the scientific literature as a distinct field of medicine that focuses on reducing or eliminating side-effects of cancer treatment and improving survivors' strength, ability to function and quality of life

This field is a subspecialty of Physical Medicine and Rehabilitation (PM&R), also known as physiatry and/or rehabilitation medicine.

== Scope of the specialty ==
Cancer rehabilitation providers focus on improving each patient's functional status. Using an interdisciplinary model of care, professionals identify patients’ goals, improve their function, develop a patient and family centered plan of care that accounts for medical, physical, psychological and social components. The aim is helping patients improve their cancer-related symptoms and treatment side effects, while promoting optimal patient function at home, work and in the community. Additionally, cancer rehabilitation physicians work on identifying musculoskeletal and neurologic problems and treat them with a variety of treatments including medications, procedures and therapy. Some of those procedures include, but are not limited to, various types of injections and other procedures. Therapeutic exercises include those guided by physical, occupational and speech therapists to work on specific motor or cognitive impairments as well as difficulties performing activities of daily living (ADLs) (dressing, bathing, toileting etc.) and instrumental activities of daily living (IADLs) such as house cleaning, shopping, etc. However, patient-driven general exercise to maintain or improve endurance and overall functional status is also an important component of the rehabilitation process. Because cancer patients’ problems typically are complex and survivors have a high likelihood of developing physical, mental and functional issues, rehabilitation experts have recommended that cancer rehabilitation be integrated in oncology care early on. Several clinical articles have highlighted the effectiveness of rehabilitation interventions before, during, and after cancer treatment to screen for, assess, and treat patients’ functional needs.

== Practice ==
=== Cancer Rehabilitation Team ===
Physicians that specialize in PM&R are usually called physiatrists (or rehabilitation medicine physicians). These doctors lead interdisciplinary teams, and they are specialists in the non-surgical treatment of musculoskeletal problems and rehabilitation medicine. Physiatrists should ideally be a part of the cancer care team as they perform diagnostic evaluations, provide unique expertise in prescribing medications, perform injections and prescribe appropriate splints and other devices to treat non-cancerous conditions that are a result of cancer treatments or the cancer itself. Other potential members of the cancer rehabilitation team include, but are not limited to, physical and occupational therapists, speech language pathologists, nurses, exercise physiologists, oncology social workers, case managers and psychologists. Physical therapists’ interventions have been shown to improve not only functional status and quality of life, but have also been shown to reduce mortality rates in survivors of multiple cancer types.

=== Patient Assessment ===
The cancer rehabilitation team evaluates and treats patients for various orthopedic, neurological and medical conditions caused by cancer or cancer-directed treatment (e.g. chemotherapy) that can significantly affect survivors’ function and quality of life. These are some of the areas that the cancer rehabilitation team may focus on:

- Diagnostic imaging for neurologic and musculoskeletal issues
- Electrodiagnostic studies for neurologic and musculoskeletal problems
- Therapeutic exercise
- General exercise for strength and cardiovascular conditioning
- Swallowing evaluation and treatment
- Speech evaluation and treatment
- Bladder/Bowel dysfunction evaluation and treatment
- Sexual dysfunction evaluation and treatment
- Home safety evaluation
- Workplace evaluation
- Oral and/or topical prescription medications
- Injectable medications
- Manipulation and/or soft tissue mobilization
- Physical medicine modalities
- Orthotics and prosthetics
- Assistive devices
- Adaptive equipment
- Durable medical equipment

== Cancer Rehabilitation Clinical Models ==
=== Hospital Care ===
Hospital-based cancer rehabilitation is provided in inpatient rehabilitation facilities, skilled nursing facilities, long-term care hospitals and hospice facilities. Cancer patients undergo a formal functional assessment to identify impairments with the aim of providing comprehensive therapy and medical care to improve their overall functional status. During this care, a variety of services are offered including, but not limited to: physical therapy, occupational therapy, speech therapy, nutrition, psychology and nursing.

=== Home Care ===
In these programs, patients receive services directly at home to provide help with symptom management, wound care, vital signs monitoring and medication management. These are typically nurse-driven programs, however, they could also be driven by therapists when the focus is function. In those cases, the home services are directed to provide patients with home therapists to undergo home driven physical, occupational or speech therapy programs.

=== Outpatient care ===
These programs promote identification and management of treatment toxicities that affect function in an outpatient setting. They offer a variety of services to address physical and emotional needs of patients. Some of these services are provided by physicians, nurses, psychologists and therapists. However, these programs could be very different from one institution to another.

=== Prehabilitation ===
Cancer prehabilitation refers to the assessments and interventions that are conducted just after diagnosis but before cancer treatment begins. A panel of experts has highlighted the importance of establishing rehabilitation services prior to the oncological treatment to optimize tolerance to surgery or adjuvant treatments, minimize toxicity and improve outcomes. Recent clinical studies have shown that cancer prehabilitation and rehabilitation can increase function and may improve outcomes and disability rates. For example, a 2020 study looking at men awaiting surgery for urological cancer showed that high-intensity interval training (HIIT) may improve heart and lung fitness within a month before their surgery. Prehabilitation also have the potential to reduce hospital stay and higher quality of life
