= List of American women photographers =

This is a list of women photographers who were born in the United States or whose works are closely associated with that country.

== A ==
- Kathryn Abbe (1919–2014), worked for Vogue in the early 1940s, later freelance, subjects include children, musicians and actors
- Berenice Abbott (1898–1991), black and white photography of New York's architecture in the 1930s, part of the straight photography movement
- Esther Henderson Abbott (1911–2008), first woman photographer for Arizona Highways Magazine
- Harriet Chalmers Adams (1875–1937), explorer whose expedition photographs were published in National Geographic
- Marian Hooper Adams (1843–1885), early portrait photographer, also local landscapes
- Lynsey Addario (born 1973), photojournalist often focusing on the role of women in traditional societies
- Laura Aguilar (1959–2018), strong feminist focus
- Lili Almog (born 1961), Israeli-American photographer, work includes nuns and Chinese Muslims
- Joan Almond (1935–2021), black and white photographer who prints her own works
- Nina Alovert (born 1935), Russian-American ballet photographer, writer
- Sama Raena Alshaibi (born 1973), see Palestine
- Jane Fulton Alt (born 1951), documented Hurricane Katrina
- Ruth Matilda Anderson (1893–1983), documented rural life in early 20th-century Spain.
- Keliy Anderson-Staley (born 1977), Houston-based photographer and professor creating tintype portraits
- Nancy Lee Andrews (born 1947), fashion, music covers
- Yvette Borup Andrews (1891–1959), photographed Central Asia for the American Museum of Natural History
- Eleanor Antin (born 1935), also works with video, film, performance and drawing
- Amy Arbus (born 1954), a New York City–based photographer
- Diane Arbus (1923–1971), black and white photographs of deviant and marginal people
- Hazel Larsen Archer (1921–2001), photographer and art theorist
- Laura Adams Armer (1874–1963), portraiture in San Francisco, images of the Navajo
- Eve Arnold (1913–2012), photojournalist with Magnum Photos
- Kristen Ashburn (born 1973), photojournalist covering AIDS in southern Africa, tuberculosis and Hurricane Katrina
- Jane Evelyn Atwood (born 1947), documentary photographer living in Paris
- Ellen Auerbach (1906–2004), German-born Jewish immigrant, remembered for pre-war work in her Berlin studio
- Alice Austen (1866–1952), from Staten Island, producing some 8,000 photographs from 1884
- Elizabeth Axtman (born 1980), emphasis on race in American culture

== B ==
- Susan Ford Bales (born 1957), photojournalist, daughter of President Gerald Ford
- Judy Bankhead (born 1951), Texas-based photographer
- Catharine Weed Barnes (1851–1913), early female editor of photographic journals, strong supporter of women photographers
- Tina Barney (born 1945), large-scale portraits of family and friends
- Martine Barrat (date of birth unknown), see France
- Ruth-Marion Baruch (1922–1997), series on the Black Panthers and the San Francisco Bay area
- Lillian Bassman (1917–2012), early fashion photographer for Harper's Bazaar
- Erica Baum (born 1961), New York photographer using printed paper and language as subject
- Jessie Tarbox Beals (1870–1942), born in Canada, first published female photojournalist in the United States
- Carol Beckwith (born 1945), photographer of the indigenous tribal cultures of Africa
- Vanessa Beecroft (born 1969), see Italy
- Jamie Beck (born 1983)
- Zaida Ben-Yusuf (1869–1933), portraits of notable Americans at the turn of the 19th–20th century, portrait gallery in New York from 1897
- Lynne Bentley-Kemp (born 1952), fine arts photographer, photography educator, and researcher
- Berry Berenson (1948–2001), freelance photographer publishing in Life, Glamour, Vogue and Newsweek
- Nina Berman (born 1960), documentary photographer, military focus
- Ruth Bernhard (1905–2006), nude photography of women and commercial photography in Hollywood
- Edyth Carter Beveridge (c. 1862 – 1927), photojournalist
- Ania Bien (born 1946), Polish-American photographer now in Amsterdam, focus on discrimination and refugees
- Joan E. Biren (born 1944), focus on lesbians and feminism
- Nadine Blacklock (1953–1998), nature photographer around Lake Superior
- Julie Blackmon (born 1966), children and family life
- Andrea Blanch (born 1946), portraits of celebrities, especially Italian men
- Lucienne Bloch (1909–1999), Swiss-born American artist and photographer, remembered for association with Diego Rivera
- Gay Block (born 1942), portrait photographer of Jewish life in Texas, Miami Beach, and Christian Rescuers from WWII; has published several photobooks
- Debra Bloomfield (born 1952), has worked in landscape since 1989; recent work has been described as "reflective activism"
- Thérèse Bonney (1894–1978), photojournalist remembered for her images of the Russian-Finnish front in World War II
- Meghan Boody (born 1964), surrealist photographer
- Andrea Booher, FEMA photographer
- Carrie Boretz, street photographer
- Nancy Borowick (born 1985), family and social issues
- Barbara Bosworth (born 1953), American artist, photographer. Bosworth works primarily with a large-format, 8x10 view camera and focuses on the relationship between humans and nature.
- Alice Boughton (c. 1867 – 1943), theatrical portraits, worked with Gertrude Käsebier, member of the Photo-Secession movement
- Margaret Bourke-White (1906–1971), first foreigner to photograph Soviet industry, first female war correspondent and first woman photographer for Life
- Louise Arner Boyd (1887–1972), explorer who took hundreds of photographs of the Arctic, detailed photographic documentation of Poland in 1934
- Louise Boyle (1910–2005), documented African-American farm workers in Arkansas during the Great Depression
- Marilyn Bridges (born 1948), ancient sites around the world
- Deborah Bright (born 1950), is an American photographer, writer, professor, and painter specializing in critical landscape photography and queer photography and painting
- Sheila Pree Bright (born 1967), fine art photographer whose work includes documentary photographic "visual essays" and portraiture.
- Anne Brigman (1869–1950), one of the original members of the Photo-Secession movement, images of nude women (including self-portraits) from 1900 to 1920
- Charlotte Brooks (1918–2014), photojournalist, staff photographer for Look
- Ellen Brooks (born 1946), pro-filmic approach, often photographing through screens
- Kate Brooks (born 1977), photojournalist specializing in the Middle East, Afghanistan and Pakistan
- Adrien Broom (born 1980), fashion and fine art photographer specializing in images of young women
- Zoe Lowenthal Brown (1927–2022), fine art photography, documentary photographic "visual essays", and portraiture.
- Esther Bubley (1921–1998), expressive photos of ordinary people, later specializing in children in hospitals and other medical themes
- Sonja Bullaty (1923–2000), photojournalist and landscape photographer
- Elizabeth Buehrmann (c. 1886 – c. 1963), pioneer of home portraits
- Shirley Burman (born 1934), women in railroad history
- Alice Burr (1883–1968), pictorialist photographer
- Eleanor Butler Alexander-Roosevelt (1888–1960), images of dignitaries, travel photos of Europe and Asia

== C ==
- Victoria Cabezas (born 1950), conceptual artist, photographer
- Evelyn Cameron (1868–1928), British born photographer who moved to Terry, Montana where she documented everyday life in the Old West
- Angela Cappetta, American photographer
- Ellen Carey (born 1952), abstract photographer
- Marion Carpenter (1920–2002), the first female national press photographer and the first woman to cover the White House
- Elinor Carucci (born 1971), an Israeli-American who has exhibited widely since 1997 and now teaches photography in New York City
- Joan Cassis (1952–1996), portrait photographer
- Dickey Chapelle (1919–1965), photojournalist known for her work as a war correspondent in World War II and the Vietnam War
- Anita Chernewski (born 1946), American photographer
- Talia Chetrit (born 1982), still life and nude photographer
- Rose Clark (1852–1942), pictorialist photographer
- Lynne Cohen (1944–2014), large prints of domestic and institutional interiors, now lives in Montreal
- Carolyn Cole (born 1961), staff photographer for the Los Angeles Times
- Anne Collier (born 1970), is an American visual artist working with appropriated photographic images.
- Marjory Collins (1912–1985), photojournalist, covered the home front during World War II
- Nancy Ford Cones (1869–1962), early photographer from Loveland, Ohio, where she documented country life
- Lois Conner (born 1951), noted particularly for her platinum print landscapes that she produces with a 7" x 17" format banquet camera
- Linda Connor (born 1944), spiritual locations
- Marjorie Content (1895–1984), Native Americans
- Martha Cooper (born 1940s), staff photographer from the New York Post in the 1970s
- Deborah Copaken (born 1966), photojournalist
- Kate Cordsen (born 1966), known for large format landscapes
- Tee Corinne (1943–2006), lesbian photographer
- Marie Cosindas (1925–2017), still life and color portraits, one of the first the exhibit color photographs at MoMA
- Honey Lee Cottrell (1946–2015), lesbian photographer, known for her work in On Our Backs
- Rachel Cox, (born 1984), documentary, known for work that deals with death and grieving
- Renée Cox (born 1960), Jamaican-born politically motivated photographer
- Susan Crocker (born 1940), photographer documenting urban environment
- Imogen Cunningham (1883–1976), known for her botanical photography, nudes and industrial landscapes

== D ==
- Louise Dahl-Wolfe (1895–1989), fashion photographer for Harper's Bazaar
- Deborah Dancy (born 1949), African-American painter, photographer, mixed media artist
- Eileen Darby (1916–2004), photographer of Broadway theatre productions
- Judy Dater (born 1941), best known for her book Imogen and Twinka about the photographer Imogen Cunningham
- Diana Davies (born 1938), graphic artist and photojournalist
- Lynn Davis (born 1944), large-scale black-and-white photographs specializing in monumental landscapes and architecture
- Liliane de Cock (1939–2013), Belgian-American photographer, Guggenheim fellow
- Perla de Leon (born 1952), New York–based photographer
- Mary Devens (1857–1920), prominent pictorial photographer of the early 20th century
- Maggie Diaz (1925–2016), see Australia
- Jessica Dimmock (born 1978), documentary photographer, covered drug addicts in New York over eight years
- Carolyn Drake (born 1971), documentary photographer, particularly of central Asia
- Corinne Dufka, photojournalist
- Barbara DuMetz (born 1947), pioneering African-American commercial photographer
- Jeanne Dunning (born 1960), photographer of the human body

== E ==
- Susan Eakins (1851–1938), artist and photographer, wife of Thomas Eakins, maintained her own studio using photography as a basis for her art
- Sarah J. Eddy (1851–1945), photographer of the 19th century early - 20th century, portraiture, home scenes, specializes in animals (especially cats)
- Dorothy Meigs Eidlitz (1891–1976), photographer, arts patron and women's rights advocate
- Melanie Einzig (born 1967), street photographer
- Sandra Eisert (born 1952), first White House picture editor in 1974
- Cynthia Elbaum (1966–1994), photojournalist killed while working in Chechnya
- Amy Elkins (born 1979) photographer
- Chansonetta Stanley Emmons (1858–1937), photographer of domestic life and New England rural landscape
- Jill Enfield (born 1954) hand coloring artist best known for her work in alternative photographic processes
- Jane English (born 1942) photographer whose publications include bestselling editions of the Tao Te Ching and the Zhuangzi Inner Chapters.
- Chris Enos (born 1944) photographer of still life and nudes and educator in New Mexico
- Marion Ettlinger (born 1949) author portraits for book jackets

== F ==
- Mary Anne Fackelman-Miner (born c. 1947), photojournalist and first female White House photographer
- Emma Justine Farnsworth (1860–1952), photographer whose works were displayed at the World's Columbian Exposition (1893) and the Paris Exposition (1900)
- Delphine Fawundu (born 1971), Brooklyn-born photographer and visual artist
- Sandi Fellman (born 1952), commercial and fine art photographer, and educator in New York City
- Anne Fishbein (born 1958), Chicago-born photographer
- Deanne Fitzmaurice (born 1957), photojournalist, winner of the Pulitzer Prize for Feature Photography in 2005
- Trude Fleischmann (1895–1990), see Austria
- Mollie Fly (1847–1925), early Arizona photographer
- Mary Lou Foy (born 1944), picture editor at the Washington Post
- Catriona Fraser (born 1972), Washington, D.C.–based photographer and art dealer
- Jona Frank (born 1966), has made work about youth culture
- Mary Frey (born 1948)
- Jill Freedman (1939–2019), New York–based documentary photographer, known for photographs of firefighters, street cops, circus life
- Toni Frissell (1907–1988), fashion photography, World War II photographs
- Eva Fuka (1927–2015), Czech-American, she is known for her melancholic works and surreal effects

== G ==
- Phyllis Galembo (born 1952)
- Sally Gall (born 1956), photographer
- Louisa Bernie Gallaher (1858–1917), scientific photographer and Smithsonian Institution's first female photographer
- Helen K. Garber (born 1954), black and white city landscapes
- Gretchen Garner (1939–2017), photographer and mixed-media artist
- Helen Gatch (1862–1942), depicted family members and views of the Oregon coast
- E. Jane Gay (1830–1919), best known for photographing the Nez Perce
- Lynn Geesaman (1938–2020), landscape photographer
- Emme Gerhard (1872–1946), worked with her sister Mayme in St. Louis, images of Native Americans and other ethnic groups
- Mayme Gerhard (1876–1955), worked with her sister Emme in St. Louis, images of Native Americans and other ethnic groups
- Wilda Gerideau-Squires (born 1946), fine art photographer
- Paola Gianturco (born 1939), photojournalist covering women in difficulty
- Laura Gilpin (1891–1979), Native Americans (Navajo) and Pueblo and Southwestern landscapes
- Barbara Gluck (born 1938), photojournalism, especially Vietnam
- Judith Golden (1934–2023) photographer of portraits of women
- Nan Goldin (born 1953), photographer of gay and trans communities, New York's hard-drug subculture, skylines
- Lynn Goldsmith (born 1948), portrait and music photographer
- Suzy Gorman (born 1962), celebrity portraits
- Karen Graffeo (born 1963), portraits, documentary
- Katy Grannan (born 1969), portraits
- Beth Green (born 1949), photojournalist
- Jill Greenberg (born 1967), portraits, covers
- Lauren Greenfield (born 1966), documentary photographer and filmmaker
- Rachel Eliza Griffiths (born 1978), poet, novelist, photographer and visual artist
- Lori Grinker (born 1957), documentary photographer, artist and filmmaker
- Jan Groover (1943–2012), large-format still-life photographer
- Debbie Grossman (born 1977), photographer, writer
- Caroline Gurrey (1875–1927), portraitist in Hawaii at the beginning of the 20th century, remembered for her series on mixed-race Hawaiian children
- Carol Guzy (born 1956), Pulitzer Prize-winning Washington Post photographer

== H ==
- Gail Albert Halaban (born 1970), staged portraits
- Margaret Hall (photographer) (1876–1963), World War I photographer
- Winifred Hall Allen, African-American photographer of the Harlem Renaissance
- Karen Halverson (born 1941), photographer
- Pauline Kruger Hamilton (1870–1919), Austrian court photographer
- Marie Hansen (1918–1969), photojournalist
- Edie Harper (1922–2010), WWII Army Corps of Engineers photographer
- Masumi Hayashi (1945–2006), photo-collage works on topics such as Japanese internment camps, abandoned prisons, city works
- Alexandra Hedison (born 1969), abstract landscapes
- Esther Henderson (1911–2008), landscape photographer
- Yvonne Hemsey (born 1948), photojournalist
- Diana Mara Henry (born 1948), photojournalist
- Nora Herting (born 1980/81), portrait photographer
- Lena Herzog (born 1970), Russian-born documentary and fine art photographer
- Mattie Edwards Hewitt (1870–1956), architectural and landscape photographer
- Elizabeth Heyert (born 1951), experimental portraiture
- Abigail Heyman (1942–2013), American feminist and photojournalist, known for her 1974 book, Growing Up Female: A Personal Photo-Journal
- Carol M. Highsmith (born 1946), architectural coverage throughout the United States
- Evelyn Hockstein, photojournalist
- Martha Holmes (1923–2006), photojournalist, staff photographer and later freelancer for Life
- Jay Hoops (1918–2004), photographer
- Roni Horn (born 1955), explores the mutable nature of art combining photography with drawing, sculpture and installations, also notable photo books
- Dorothy Hosmer (1911–2008), photographer and travel writer
- Whitney Hubbs (born 1977)
- Elfie Caroline Huntington (1868–1949), portrait photographer

== I ==
- Connie Imboden (born 1953), photographer of nudes
- Polly Irungu, photographer and journalist
- Edith Irvine (1884–1949), documentary work including the San Francisco earthquake

== J ==
- Marcey Jacobson (1911–2009), indigenous peoples of southern Mexico
- Acacia Johnson (born 1990), polar photographer
- Belle Johnson (1864–1945), portraiture, including character studies, and photographs of animals (especially cats)
- Frances Benjamin Johnston (1864–1952), early photojournalist, first woman to have a studio in Washington, D.C., portraits of celebrities for magazines
- Lynn Johnson (born 1953), photojournalist
- Roz Joseph (1926–2019), took black-and-white photographs of New York City, world travels
- Sarah Louise Judd (1802–1886), early photographer in Minnesota taking daguerreotypes in 1848

== K ==
- Consuelo Kanaga (1894–1978), portraits including African-Americans
- Gertrude Käsebier (1852–1934), known for her coverage of Native Americans and portraits
- Barbara Kasten (born 1936), photograms and multicolor still lifes
- Emy Kat (born 1959), fashion, advertising
- Mary Morgan Keipp (1875–1961), art photography, African-Americans
- Marie Hartig Kendall (1854–1943), portraiture and landscapes in Connecticut
- Miru Kim (born 1981), art photography
- Helen Johns Kirtland (1890–1979), photojournalist and war correspondent, coverage of World War I
- Tarrah Krajnak (born 1979)
- Stacy Kranitz (born 1976)
- Carolyn Krieg (born 1953), mixed-media artist with photography
- Barbara Kruger (born 1945), conceptual black-and-white photography
- Justine Kurland (born 1969), fine art photography

== L ==
- Tamara Lackey, lifestyle photographer
- Sarah Ladd (1860–1927), early pictorial and landscape photographer
- Kay Lahusen (1930–2021), first openly gay photojournalist of the gay rights movement
- Wendy Sue Lamm (born 1964), photojournalist noted for her images of Palestine
- Dorothea Lange (1895–1965), documentary photographer and photojournalist, covered the Great Depression
- Gillian Laub (born 1975)
- Alma Lavenson (1897–1989), documented California's Gold Rush
- Nina Leen (1914–1995), Russian-born American photographer, avid contributor to Life, remembered above all for her photographs of animals
- Adelaide Hanscom Leeson (1875–1931), early photo-illustrated books
- Annie Leibovitz (born 1949), portrait photographer, worked for Rolling Stone magazine and later Vanity Fair
- Joanne Leonard (born 1940), photography of Oakland, Ca, autobiographical and family, and collage beinginpictures.com
- Zoe Leonard (born 1961), photography of New York City, photos of the fictional Fae Richards for the film The Watermelon Woman
- Rebecca Lepkoff (1916–2014), street scenes on the Lower East Side of Manhattan in the 1940s
- Isa Leshko (born 1971), fine art photographer known for her Elderly Animals series
- Sherrie Levine (born 1947), appropriation photography
- Dina Litovsky (born 1979), subcultures, leisure and sexual politics
- Helen Levitt (1907–2009), street photography around New York City
- Jacqueline Livingston (1943–2013), women's role, sexual intimacy
- Ruth Harriet Louise (1903–1940), first woman photographer active in Hollywood, running Metro-Goldwyn-Mayer's portrait studio from 1925 to 1930
- Layla Love (born 1979), fine art photographer
- Elizabeth Gill Lui (born 1951), abstract collage

== M ==
- Diane MacKown, portraits
- Vivian Maier (1926–2009), unknown during her lifetime, her street photographs of Chicago were first published in 2011
- Rose Mandel (1910–2002), Polish-born photographer based in Berkeley, won Guggenheim Fellowship in 1967
- Ann Mandelbaum (born 1945), artist and photographer
- Sally Mann (born 1951), large black-and-white photographs of young children, then later of landscapes suggesting decay and death
- Nancy Manter (born 1951), weather, the environment and landscape
- Lizbeth Marano (born 1950), images from Iceland, France, Italy and Spain
- Malerie Marder (born 1971), human intimacy
- Mary Ellen Mark (1940–2015), known for photojournalism, portraits and advertising photography, also covered homelessness, drug addiction and prostitution
- Diana Markosian (born 1989), documentary/photo-essayist
- Louise Martin (1911–1995), known for photographs of the Funeral of Martin Luther King Jr.
- Margrethe Mather (1886–1952), collaborated with Edward Weston
- Jill Mathis (born 1964), works based on etymology
- Rebecca Matlock (1928–2019), images from Moscow and Czechoslovakia
- Kate Matthews (1870–1956), photographed scenes of everyday life in Pewee Valley, Kentucky, also as illustrations for Annie Fellows Johnston's The Little Colonel books
- Dona Ann McAdams (born 1954), performance photography
- Linda McCartney (1942–1998), photographed pop stars in the 1960s
- Melodie McDaniel (born 1967), celebrity portraits, fashion, advertising
- Elizabeth Parker McLachlan (born 1938), photographer, professor, writer and editor specializing in the Bury Bible
- Laura McPhee (born 1958), art photography
- Susan Meiselas (born 1948), documentary photographer working for Magnum Photos, covering human rights issues in Latin America and the Nicaraguan Revolution
- Meryl Meisler (born 1951), photographed in New York City nightclubs and residents of Bushwick, Brooklyn
- Monika Merva (born 1969), photographer and artist
- Florence Meyer (1911–1962), celebrity portrait photographer
- Sonia Handelman Meyer (1920–2022), street photographer
- Hansel Mieth (1909–1998), born in Germany, joined Life magazine in 1937 until the early 1950s, photographing the Japanese at internment camps during World War II
- Lee Miller (1907–1977), fashion photographer in Paris, war correspondent for Vogue covering the London blitz and the liberation of Paris
- Susan Mikula (born 1958), photographer and artist
- Cristina Mittermeier (born 1966), Mexican-American, known for images of indigenous people
- Lisette Model (1906–1983), born in Austria, first photographed the upper classes in Nice in 1934, later worked for PM magazine in New York, also publishing in Harper's Bazaar
- Andrea Modica (born 1960), photography professor
- Barbara Morgan (1900–1992), photographer of modern dancers, co-founder of Aperture
- Lida Moser (1920–2014), photojournalism, documentaries and street photography, contributed to Vogue, Harper's Bazaar, Look and Esquire
- Joan Moss (born 1931), American photographer, born in Canada
- Helen Messinger Murdoch (1862–1956), pioneered the use of autochromes in travel photography

== N ==
- Marilyn Nance (born 1953), official photographer for the North American Zone of FESTAC 77, the Second World Festival of Black and African Arts and Culture, and two-time finalist for the W. Eugene Smith Award in Humanistic Photography.
- Bea Nettles (born 1946), alternative techniques
- Lennette Newell (born 1959), animal, advertising, fashion, commercial and wildlife photography
- Carol Newsom (1946–2003), sports photojournalist with focus on tennis
- Liz Nielsen (active since 2002), traditional analogue photographer
- Lora Webb Nichols (1883–1962), photographed every day life in Wyoming
- Anne Noggle (1922–2005), a photographer after a career as an aviator, depicted the ageing process of women and as curator introduced other women photographers to the public
- Dorothy Norman (1905–1997), amateur portrait photographer
- [Elisabeth Novick] International fashion photographer. Dual nationality French + American. Trained at Parson School of Design, Evelyn Hofer, Alexey Brodovitch

== O ==
- Catherine Opie (born 1961), addresses documentary photography, professor of photography at UCLA
- Alice O'Malley (born 1962), photographer
- Kei Orihara (born 1948), Japanese photographer resident in the US for several periods
- Ruth Orkin (1921–1985), photojournalist contributing to Life, Look and Ladies' Home Journal, later teaching photography in New York City
- Gina Osterloh (born 1973), photographer, conceptual artist

== P ==
- Jean Pagliuso (born 1941), photographer of poultry and fashion
- Esther Parada (1938–2005), American photographer
- Olivia Parker (born 1941), still-life photographer
- Marvin Breckinridge Patterson (1905–2002), photojournalist, published world travel photographs in Vogue, National Geographic, Look, Life, Town & Country, and Harper's Bazaar
- Stacy Pearsall (born 1980), military photographer, twice winner of the NPPA Military Photographer of the Year award
- Barbara Peacock, photographer of the lives of Americans
- Sylvia Plachy (born 1943), born in Hungary, has published photo essays and portraits in The New York Times Magazine, The Village Voice and The New Yorker, also personal coverage of Central Europe
- Mimi Plumb (born 1953)
- Anita Pollitzer (1894–1975), associated with Georgia O'Keeffe and Alfred Stieglitz
- Lucy Wallace Porter (1876–1962), architectural photographer
- Greta Pratt (born 1960), known for documenting staged American history
- Melanie Pullen (born 1975), specializes in large prints (from four to ten feet) of crime scenes, specially set up using models and crew
- Rosamond W. Purcell (born 1942), specializes in images of natural history

== R ==
- Rachel Raab (born 1981), professional photographer and multimedia artist
- Anne Rearick (born 1960)
- Joan Redmond (born 1946), photographer
- Jane Reece (1868–1961), pictorial photographer, portraits, autochromes
- Marcia Reed (born 1948), first female still photographer of the International Cinematographers Guild in 1973 and to win the Society of Operating Cameramen Lifetime Achievement Award (still photographer) in 2000.
- Andrea Star Reese (born 1952), documentary photographer, photojournalist
- Blanche Reineke (1863–1935), portrait photographer, particularly of children
- Susan Ressler (born 1949), photographer
- Nancy Rexroth (born 1946), plastic camera work
- Meghann Riepenhoff (born 1979)
- Cherie Roberts (born 1978), nude models
- Ruth Robertson (1905–1998), photojournalist remembered for her work on the Angel Falls in Venezuela, establishing them as the tallest in the world
- Ann Rosener (1914–2012), photographed home front activities for the Farm Security Administration in 1942–43
- Barbara Rosenthal (born 1948), avant-garde artist, using photography along with video, installation and digital media to achieve surreal photography
- Martha Rosler (born 1943), photographer, video artist, conceptual and installation work, also known for writing
- Judith Joy Ross (born 1946), 8x10 photographer, known for 80's east coast school portraits
- Lindsey Ross (born 1981), fine-art photographer using historical processes and techniques
- Charlotte Rosshandler (born 1943), Canadian-American photographer
- Alison Rossiter (born 1953)
- Louise Rosskam (1910–2003), documented life during the Great Depression
- Irina Rozovsky (born 1981)
- Eva Rubinstein (born 1933), intimate views of people and (often empty) interiors
- Raeanne Rubenstein (1945–2019), portrait photographer
- Julia Ann Rudolph (c. 1820 – c. 1890), studio photographer active in New York and California for over 40 years
- Liza Ryan (born 1965), film and photography installations

== S ==
- Gulnara Samoilova (born 1964)
- Naomi Savage (1927–2005), portrait photographer
- Lynn Saville (born 1950), night time urban photographer
- Keisha Scarville (born 1975)
- Erin Schaff (born 1989), photojournalist
- Virginia Schau (1915–1989), the first woman to win the Pulitzer Prize for Photography, in 1954
- Justine Schiavo-Hunt (born 1966), also known as Justine Ellement, photojournalist for The Boston Herald and The Boston Globe
- Wendi Schneider (born 1955), images of nature and wildlife printed on paper vellum with hand-applied layers of gold leaf
- Collier Schorr (born 1963), portraits of young men and women
- Sarah Choate Sears (1858–1935), portraits and still lifes from the 1890s
- Heather Sheehan (born 1961), photographer and artist
- Cindy Sherman (born 1954), conceptual portraits, staged photographs of herself, Untitled #96 sold for $3.89 million in 2011
- Editta Sherman (1912–2013), celebrity photographer
- Janell Shirtcliff (born 1982 or 1983), fashion and music photographer and filmmaker
- Melissa Shook (1939–2020), documentary photographer, artist and educator
- Elizabeth Siegfried (born 1955), photographer of self-portraiture, photographic narrative and meditative landscapes
- Lee Sievan (1907–1990)
- Marilyn Silverstone (1929–1999), photojournalist who came to specialize in India and the Himalayas
- Kate Simon (born 1953), portrait photographer known for her photographs of famous musicians and artists
- Taryn Simon (born 1975), creator of projects involving large numbers of photographs
- Lorna Simpson (born 1960), documentary street photographer who moved into ethnic divisions and racism in the 1980s
- Sandy Skoglund (born 1946), surrealist photographer creating tableaux based on her own sets
- Claudia Smigrod (born 1949), photographer
- Clara Sheldon Smith (1862-1939), 19th-century portrait and landscape photographer
- Dayna Smith (born 1962), photojournalist who won the 1999 World Press Photo of the Year
- Polly Smith (1908–1980), photographed life in Texas in the 1930s
- Summer A. Smith, 19th-century daguerreotype photographer
- Rosalind Fox Solomon (1930–2025), New York–based photographer of the world, especially Peru, in square monochrome
- Camille Solyagua (born 1959), photograms photographer of plants, animals and insects
- Eve Sonneman (born 1946), artist, photographer, working in colour and black and white
- Ema Spencer (1857–1941), Newark, Ohio–based amateur photographer
- Melissa Springer (born 1956), photojournalist
- Susan Hacker Stang (born 1949), alternative cameras, also academic
- Sally Stapleton (born 1957), executive photo editor at Associated Press until 2003
- Sandra Stark (born 1951)
- Nina Howell Starr (1903–2000), photographer of American roadside attractions and folk art culture, and art historian
- Maggie Steber, documentary photographer for National Geographic
- Gitel Steed (1914–1977), anthropologist, ethnological photographer
- Amy Stein (born 1970), staged views, frequently with animals
- Nellie Stockbridge (c. 1868 – 1965), early Idaho mining district photographer
- Chanell Stone (born 1992), photographer
- Zoe Strauss (born 1970), shuttered buildings, empty parking lots and vacant meeting halls in South Philadelphia
- Nancy M. Stuart, portrait photographer; photography educator and administrator
- Stephanie Pfriender Stylander (born 1960), photographer
- Rachel Sussman (born 1975), living organisms at least 2,000 years old
- Sylvia de Swaan (1941-2023), director of Sculpture Space in Utica, New York

== T ==
- Paulette Tavormina (born 1949), fine-art photographer
- Maggie Taylor (born 1961), artistic digital imaging
- Deanna Templeton (born 1969)
- Joyce Tenneson (born 1945), fine art photographer, often of nude or semi-nude women, with cover images on a range of periodicals including Time, Life, and Entertainment Weekly
- Paula Gately Tillman (born 1946), street photography, portraits
- Beatrice Tonnesen (1871–1958), early views of live models for advertising
- Barbara Traub, street photography, landscapes, portraits
- Ka-Man Tse (born 1981)
- Jane Tuckerman (born 1947), documenting rituals and displaced communities, mixed-media collage
- Deborah Turbeville (1932–2013), fashion photographer
- Mellon Tytell (born 1945), fashion and editorial photographer, did documentary series on Haiti and portraits of figures from the Beat Generation

== U ==
- Doris Ulmann (1884–1934), known for her portraits of craftsmen and musicians from Appalachia
- Penelope Umbrico (born 1957), is an American visual artist working with appropriated photographic images.

== V ==
- Raissa Venables (born 1977), surreal interiors
- Ami Vitale (born 1971), photojournalist and documentary work, National Geographic photographer
- Bernis von zur Muehlen (born 1942), fine arts photographer, notably of the male nude

== W ==
- Elizabeth Flint Wade (1849–1915), pictorial work exhibited jointly with Rose Clark
- Lissa Wales (1957–2005)
- Barbra Walz (1950/51–1990), fashion photographer known for portraits of designers
- Eva Watson-Schütze (1867–1935), pictorial-style portraits, founding member of Photo-Secession
- Rebecca Norris Webb (born 1956)
- Carrie Mae Weems (born 1953), concerned with the problems of African Americans, often staging sets for her images
- Terri Weifenbach
- Sandra Weiner (1921–2014), Polish-American street photographer and children's book author
- Alisa Wells (1927–1987), experimental photography
- Annie Wells (born 1954), Pulitzer Prize-winning photojournalist
- Eudora Welty (1909–2001), documentary work on the rural poor in Mississippi from the early 1930s and the effects of the Great Depression
- Lily White (photographer) (1866–1944), landscape photographer, particularly of Oregon
- Susan Wides (born 1955), photographer
- Myra Albert Wiggins (1869–1956), pictorial work, member of the Photo-Secession movement
- Hannah Wilke (1940–1993), performance artist and photographer
- Jennette Williams (1952–2017), photographer
- Laura Wilson (born 1939), photographic essayist
- Deborah Willis (born 1948), curator and exhibition organizer
- Merry Moor Winnett (1951–1994), noted for experimental imagery
- Dawn Wirth (born 1960), photographer
- Sharon Wohlmuth (1946–2022), photojournalist and best-seller author
- Marion Post Wolcott (1910–1990), worked for Farm Security Administration documenting poverty during the Great Depression
- Linda Wolf (born 1950), One of the first women in rock and roll photography; early work in France covers village life, later bus benches in the United States and multicultural portraits for Los Angeles billboards
- Penny Wolin (born 1953), portraiture, visual anthropology, concerned with documenting American Jewish culture
- Susan Wood (born 1932), worked for Life, People, and New York magazines from the 1960s to the 1980s
- Francesca Woodman (1958–1981), black-and-white photographs of herself and nude female models
- Constance Philpitt Warner (1897–1992), worked with the Smithsonian National Zoo

== Y ==
- Bunny Yeager (1929–2014), figure photographer and former pin-up model
- Becky Yee (born 1969), portrait photographer and business founder
- Yelena Yemchuk (born 1970), fashion, advertising and album photography, also videos

== Z ==
- Cassandra Zampini (born 1983) photographer and digital artist

== See also ==
- List of women photographers
