= Zoe Brown =

Zoe Brown may refer to:

- Zoe Brown (pole vaulter), Northern Irish pole vaulter and competitor at Athletics at the 2014 Commonwealth Games – Women's pole vault
- Zoe Brown, character in Love Island (2015 TV series)
- Zoe Lowenthal Brown (1927–2022), American photographer
