= Rebecca Norris Webb =

American photographer (born 1956)

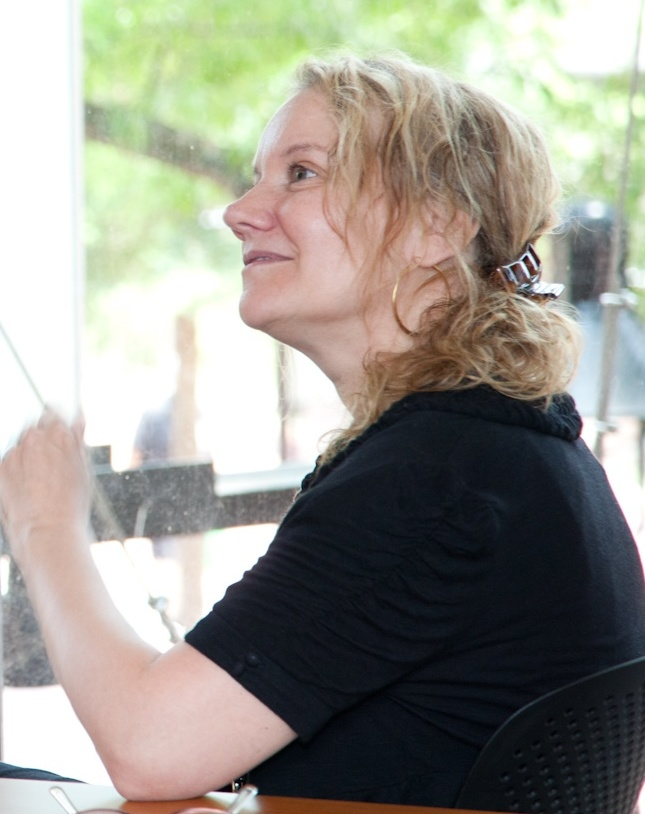
- Rebecca Webb in 2011
- Born: 1956 (age 69–70); Rushville, Indiana
- Known for: Photography
- Notable work: The Glass Between Us; Violet Isle: A Duet of Photographs from Cuba; My Dakota; Night Calls
- Spouse: Alex Webb
- Website: www.webbnorriswebb.co

Rebecca Norris Webb (born 1956) is an American photographer. Originally a poet, her books often combine text and images. An NEA grant recipient, she has work in the collections of the Museum of Fine Arts, Boston, and The Cleveland Museum of Art. Her photographs have appeared in The New Yorker, The New York Times Magazine, Le Monde, and other magazines. She sometimes collaborates with photographer Alex Webb, her husband and creative partner.

== Life and career ==
Norris Webb was born in Rushville, Indiana and moved to the Black Hills of South Dakota in 1972 at the age of 15.

Her photography books often interweave photographs and spare text. These include the monographs—The Glass Between Us: Reflections on Urban Creatures (2006), My Dakota: An Elegy for My Brother Who Died Unexpectedly (2012), and Night Calls (2020)—as well as collaborations with her husband and creative partner, Alex Webb: Violet Isle: A Duet of Photographs from Cuba (2009), Memory City (2014), On Street Photography and the Poetic Image (2014), Slant Rhymes (2017), and Brooklyn: The City Within (2019). My Dakota blends her spare text with photographs of her home state of South Dakota where she came of age. For Night Calls, she retraced the route of some of her 99-year-old doctor father house calls, in the same rural county where they both were born, Rush County, Indiana.

Her work has been exhibited at the Museum of Fine Arts, Boston, the George Eastman Museum, the Cleveland Museum of Art, and the Museum of the City of New York. My Dakota was first exhibited in 2012 at the Dahl Arts Center in Rapid City, South Dakota, and later exhibited at the North Dakota Museum of Art in Grand Forks, North Dakota, (2013), the Southeast Museum of Photography, Daytona, Florida, (2013), Ricco/Maresca Gallery in New York City, NYC, (2013), Blue Sky Gallery, Portland, Oregon, (2015), and the Cleveland Museum of Art, Cleveland, Ohio, (2015).

In 2019, she was a recipient of a National Endowment for the Arts grant.

Norris Webb teaches photography workshops with her husband and creative partner, Alex Webb.

== Publications ==
=== Books by Norris Webb ===
- The Glass Between Us. New York: Channel Photographics, 2006. ISBN 978-0-976670-88-9.
- My Dakota. Santa Fe, NM: Radius, 2012. ISBN 978-1-934435-47-2.
- Night Calls. Santa Fe, NM: Radius, 2020. ISBN 978-1-942185-77-2.
- A Difficulty Is a Light. Marseille, France: Chose Commune, 2024. ISBN 979-10-96383-45-0.

=== Books paired with Alex Webb ===
- Alex Webb and Rebecca Norris Webb, Violet Isle. Santa Fe, NM: Radius, 2009. ISBN 978-1-934435-18-2.
- Alex Webb and Rebecca Norris Webb, Memory City. Santa Fe, NM: Radius. 2014. ISBN 978-1-934435-76-2.
- Alex Webb and Rebecca Norris Webb on Street Photography and the Poetic Image: The Photography Workshop Series. New York: Aperture, 2014. ISBN 978-1-59711-257-4.
- Alex Webb and Rebecca Norris Webb, Slant Rhymes. Madrid: La Fábrica, 2017. ISBN 978-8416248865.
- Alex Webb and Rebecca Norris Webb, Brooklyn: The City Within. New York: Aperture, 2019. ISBN 978-1597114561.
- Alex Webb and Rebecca Norris Webb, Waves. Santa Fe, NM: Radius Books. 2022. ISBN 978-1942185963.

=== Books with contributions by Norris Webb ===
- Contatti. Provini d'Autore = Choosing the best photo by using the contact sheet. Vol. I. Edited by Giammaria De Gasperis. Rome, Italy: Postcart, 2012. ISBN 978-88-86795-87-6.
- Picturing America's National Parks. New York, New York: Aperture, 2016. Co-published with George Eastman Museum. ISBN 978-1-59711-356-4.
- ONE. Santa Fe, New Mexico: Radius, 2017. ISBN 978-19-42185-34-5.
- Documentum Issue 2: Pictures and Words. Atlanta, Georgia: Fall Line Press, 2016.
- Street Photography: A History In 100 Iconic Images. Edited by David Gibson. Munich, London: Prestel, 2019. ISBN 3791384880.
- Photographers Looking at Photographs: 75 Pictures from the Pilara Foundation. San Francisco, California: Pier 24, 2019. ISBN 978-1-59711-006-8.
- Women Street Photographers. Munich; London; New York: Prestel, 2021. Edited by Gulnara Samoilova. ISBN 978-3-7913-8740-6. With a foreword by Ami Vitale and an essay by Melissa Breyer.
- Photo No-No's: Meditations on What Not to Photograph. Edited by Jason Fulford. New York: Aperture, 2021. ISBN 978-159711-4998.

Non-English language books

- My Dakota. Rome: Postcart, 2016. ISBN 978-8886795708
- Alex Webb and Rebecca Norris Webb, Rimas de Reojo. Madrid: La Fábrica, 2017. ISBN 978-8416248940.
