= Sadie Cook =

American photographer

Sadie Cornette Cook
- Born: 1997 (age 28–29); Chapel Hill, North Carolina, U.S.
- Education: University of North Carolina School of the Arts; Yale University
- Occupations: Photographer multidisciplinary artist
- Years active: 2014–present

Sadie Cornette Cook (born 1997) is an American photographer and multidisciplinary artist based in Reykjavík, Iceland. Their work, which explores identity, gender, and sexuality across multiple media, has been exhibited internationally and included in photographic books held in the collections of MoMA, and the Tate.

== Early life and education ==
Cook was born in Chapel Hill, North Carolina, and attended the high school Visual Arts program at the University of North Carolina School of the Arts, where they won multiple awards including American Vision Awards and Scholastic Art & Writing Competition honors.

Cook graduated from Yale University in 2020, receiving the Louis Sudler Prize for Excellence in the Creative Arts. Following graduation, they were awarded a Fulbright Scholarship to study in Iceland for 2020–2021.

== Career ==
Cook's work has been featured in magazines including MATTE Magazine, which dedicated an issue to their photography focused on queer themes. In 2014, one of their photographs appeared in the BBC News Magazine's Freedom 2014 feature.

In 2022, Cook co-founded the artist-run gallery Kannski in Reykjavík with Diljá Þorvaldsdóttir, which provides exhibition opportunities for underrepresented artists. In 2025, Cook, as a representative of Kannski, co-authored an open letter on demographic disparities in the Icelandic artscsene.

In 2024–2025, Cook collaborated with Jo Pawlowska on the exhibition Everything I Want to Tell You at the Reykjavík Art Museum's D-Gallery, as one of its D-Salur exhibitions; a series that highlights young artists shaping the Icelandic Art-scene. The exhibition was co-authored over the course of a year and supported by the Icelandic Visual Arts Fund. In 2026, the pair will show their work in Paris in the Circulations festival of Young European Photography.

Cook has served as a guest critic at Yale, Harvard, and New York University.

== See also ==
- List of American women photographers
- List of Yale University people
