= Lennette Newell =

American photographer

- Born: 1959 (age 66–67); Kimball, Nebraska, United States
- Education: Brooks Institute of Photography
- Occupation: Photographer
- Known for: Animal photography, Commercial photography, Fashion photography
- Notable work: Ani-human series Welcome to the World (2011); Ani-human (2016)
- Website: www.lennettenewell.com

Lennette Newell (born 1959) is an American photographer based in San Francisco, California, known for her animal, advertising, fashion, commercial and wildlife photography.

She has been selected as one of the 200 Best Ad Photographers by Lürzer's Archive of 2016/17, 2018/19, and 2019/20 and was named one of the 'Top 25 Photographers of 2020' by Creative Quarterly.

She is the recipient of numerous awards, including Communications Arts, American Photography 37, International Photography Awards, Lucie Awards, Hasselblad Masters Award, Black & White Spider Awards, PDN Annual, American Photography 26, Graphis, Hasselblad Masters Award, International Photography Awards, Photography Masters Cup, and Px3 Prix de la Photographie.

== Early life and education ==
Newell was born and grew up in Kimball, Nebraska, USA. She received her education from Brooks Institute of Photography in Santa Barbara, California. By the age of 6, she was an accomplished horseback rider, and won various pole and barrel racing competitions. Her father was a large animal veterinarian.

== Work ==
After completing her education, as a photographer, she pursued a career in commercial photography, specializing in photographing children and animals for advertising and corporate clients. She owns a studio Lennette Newell Photography, where she has photographed ads for brands like Milk-Bone, Blue Buffalo, Iams, Eukanuba, and Meow Mix.

Her works have received recognition from the American Photographic Artists National Awards, the 200 Best Ad Photographers, and the Lucie Awards. Some of her notable works include images of birds, such as Augur Buzzard (Buteo augur), Green Winged Macaw (Ara chloropterus), and Swainson's Toucan (Ramphastos swainsonii).

Lennette Newell co-authored a book named Welcome to the World, published by Kids Can Press in 2011, followed by publishing her another photography book named Ani-Human by Blurb in 2016.

=== Ani-Human series ===
She is known for her Ani-Human series of portraits, where she combines orchestrates single captures and composite images of wild animals with humans in body paint together without a spatial barrier. Her themed photography Ani-Human integrates humans and animals. The series portrays the certainty that a tranquil co-inhabitance can exist, and therefore the possibility that it could propagate. She turns her human subjects into representations of animals such as Baboons, zebras, lions, cheetahs, monkeys using body paint and makeup. It had received numerous international awards in 2011. She was featured in an episode of Travel Channel China for her Ani-Human series in 2016.

== Exhibitions ==
Newell exhibits her work internationally, including Les Rencontres de la Photographie, Galerie Photo XII Paris, Leo Burnett in London, LA Art Show, Municipal Heritage Museum, Málaga, Novado Gallery, New Jersey and The Fair Art Show in New York, Les Rencontres de la Photographie, Dolores Art Volterra, Italy, Galerie Photo XII Paris, Galerie Bestregarts Frankfurt, the Centre de Cultura Contemporània de Barcelona, and others.

== Books ==
- Newell, Lennette (August 2011). Welcome to the World. Kids Can Press. ISBN 978-1-554535-93-4.
- Newell, Lennette (September 2016). Ani-human.

== Awards and recognition ==
- Communication Arts Photography Annual, 2019, 2021
- American Photography 28,30,32,33,35,36,37, 2012, 2014 2016, 2017, 2019, 2020, 2021
- Julia Margaret Cameron Award, 2021
- Graphis Photography Annual Platinum Master Photographer, 2017, 2018, 2019, 2020
- 200 Best Ad Photographers Lüerzers Archive, 2012, 2013, 2014, 2015, 2018, 2019, 2020, 2021
- International Photography Awards (IPA), 2005 through 2020 (15 consecutive years)
- American Photographic Artists National Awards, 2020
- American Photographic Artists Regional Awards, 2018, 2019, 2020
- International Color Awards, 2014, 2015, 2016, 2018, 2019, 2020
- Black & White Spider Awards, 2012, 2013, 2014, 2015, 2016, 2017, 2018, 2019, 2020
- Moscow Int'l Foto Award, 2014
- PDN Photography Annual Photography, 2014
- Pollux Award, 2014,2015, 2016, 2017
- Hasselblad Masters Award Finalist, 2012
- International Aperture Awards
- Prix de la Photographie, Paris, 2013, 2014, 2015, 2016
- Creative Quarterly, 2020
- 3rd Jacob Riis Award, 2013
- Photography Masters Cup, 2012, 2013

== Personal life ==
She lives in Northern California near San Francisco, California.

== See also ==
- List of American women photographers
