= Lürzer's Archive =

Bi-monthly magazine for the advertising industry

- Editor: Michael Weinzettl
- Categories: Advertising
- Frequency: Bi-monthly
- Total circulation: 38,000
- Founder: Walter Lürzer
- Founded: 1984
- Country: Austria
- Based in: Vienna

Lürzer's Archive (also known as Luerzer's Archive) is an international publication and online archive for the advertising industry, featuring selected advertising campaigns and commercial creative work from around the world. The magazine was founded in 1984 and has a global circulation of 38,000, and has been described as "one of the foremost advertising magazines in the world." The headquarters of the magazine is in Vienna.

In an interview with editor-in-chief Michael Weinzettl, Romanian magazine Sapte Seri said, "Whether you enter the offices of a big advertising agency or a small creative boutique, invariably you will see somewhere on the white shelves a collection of Lürzer's Archive. You don’t find these magazines in press kiosks, but those who work in advertising know them by heart. They are their tools for inspiration and small 'innocent thefts'".

== History ==
The magazine was founded by Walter Lürzer, a cofounder of advertising agencies Ogilvy & Mather, TBWA Frankfurt and Lürzer, Conrad, Publicis, MullenLowe, Havas, McCann and Saatchi & Saatchi which in 1980 merged with Leo Burnett. At first based in Frankfurt, Germany, in 2002 the magazine's head office relocated to Salzburg, Austria and then to Vienna, Austria, in 2008. Michael Weinzettl, who was appointed editor-in-chief in the 1980s, became publisher after Lürzer's death in April 2011.

In 1997 a Chinese version began to be published and in 2004 African distribution commenced in Nigeria and was later extended to cover the whole of Africa. In 2005 expansion into Eastern Europe began in Romania.

In 2005 the first annual Lürzer's Archive students contest was staged for the first time and from February 2011 it began to feature digital campaigns.

Since 1998 the magazine has also published Lürzer's Archive Specials; volumes on photography, Illustration, packaging, product/music design and other creative fields. In 2011 they began to publish the 200best series, including 200best [photographers] and 200best [digital artists]. Its website includes an online archive, editorial features, interviews, special reports, Rankings and Profiles.

In 2021, the headquarters moved to London and Weinzettl stepped back from the editor-in-chief role into an advisory curatorial position, with editorial leadership taken on by a group of editors under director Lewis Blackwell.
