= Esther Henderson =

American photographer (1911–2008)

- Born: July 24, 1911; Oak Park, Illinois, U.S.
- Died: August 22, 2008 (aged 97)
- Education: New York Institute of Photography

Esther Henderson (also known as Esther Abbott) (July 24, 1911 – August 22, 2008) was an American landscape photographer. She was a major contributor to Arizona Highways beginning in the 1930s.

== Early life ==
Esther Henderson was born in 1911 in Oak Park, Illinois. She was an only child. As a child she had a key experience during a series of visits to rural Arizona in 1929. During a visit to the Grand Canyon with her parents, she peered over the edge of the canyon and upon leaving she wanted to return as soon as possible.

She spent seven years in as a dancer during the Great Depression in New York City, before changing careers to study photography as it would offer "freedom and creativity." She attended the New York Institute of Photography and then moved to Tucson, Arizona in 1935 to start her photography career. She married Charles “Chuck” Abbott in 1940, a fellow photographer 15 years her senior. The two worked together and, with their two sons, traveled and wrote and photographed for travel publications.

== Career ==
She established a photography studio in Tucson with the support of her father, who helped her find the right location. In establishing herself as a photographer in Tucson, she came up against arbitrary licensing requirements which she was advised to ignore. She proceeded to establish herself as one of the first professional photographers in Arizona. She started The Photocenter photography studio. Later, she established the first color lab in Arizona, Color Classics, in Tucson.

Her first year of business found Ray Carlson, the new editor at Arizona Highways at her studio looking to buy photographs. This started a long collaboration that culminated in the January 1968 issue of the magazine being dedicated to her photographs.

Way Out West with Esther Henderson was a photographic feature in the Saturday edition of the Tucson (Daily) Citizen newspaper from 1952 to 1958. A photo she took of Mather Point in the Grand Canyon was featured in a January 1958 issue of the Saturday Evening Post.

She and her husband Chuck Abbott moved to Santa Cruz, California in 1963 where they lived until their deaths. While in Santa Cruz they were actively involved in the community and were remembered for their work restoring a number of houses in town. They also initiated an effort to clean up and restore downtown Santa Cruz, for which they are memorialized in the name Abbott Square.

The couple is responsible for the preservation of Santa Cruz's Mark Abbott Memorial Lighthouse. The red brick building honors the Abbott's 18-year-old son, Mark, who drowned while bodysurfing near Pleasure Point. The couple rebuilt the previously decaying lighthouse after the county rejected their offer to build new bathrooms at Pleasure Point, according to newspaper records. Their other son, Carl, traveled the world for 15 years. He worked in Australia, Thailand, Vietnam, Japan and Sweden. He spent time in India studying yoga. He returned to Santa Cruz and started a family with his wife, Leslie. Esther had 2 grandkids, Luke and Kyle. They all lived next door to Esther. After Mark's death, Henderson dedicated the next 40 years to volunteering at the Salvation Army Corps in Santa Cruz. There she played piano at services, packed food bags, and taught children Bible history and music, among other efforts.

== Legacy ==
There is an archive of Henderson and her husband's slides relating to Santa Cruz at the University of Santa Cruz.
