= Paulette Tavormina =

American fine-art photographer (born 1949)

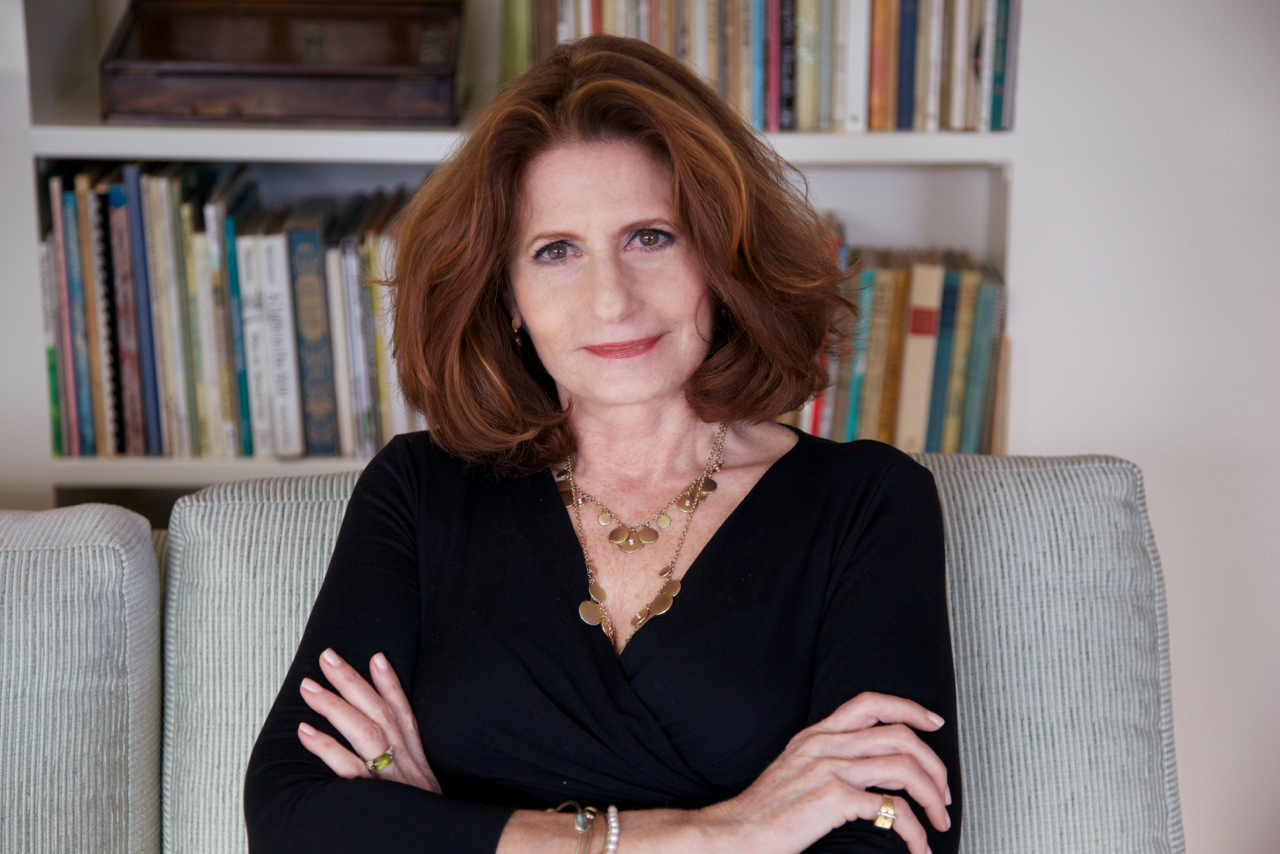
Paulette Tavormina, 2013

Paulette Tavormina (born 1949 in Rockville Centre, New York) is an American fine-art photographer who lives and works in Connecticut and New York City. Tavormina is best known for her series, Natura Morta, which features photographic imagery inspired by 17th century Dutch, Spanish and Italian Old Master still life painters.

== Career ==
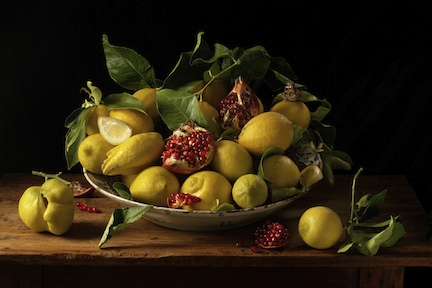
Lemons and Pomegranates, After J.V.H, 2010, by Paulette Tavormina

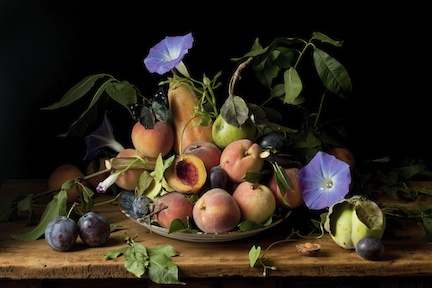
Peaches and Morning Glories, after G.G., 2010, by Paulette Tavormina

Tavormina's interest in photography grew out of a 1980's request by a New York public relations firm to photograph a visiting celebrity. She then took an introductory class at the International Center of Photography in New York. After moving to Santa Fe, New Mexico, Tavormina took a class in black and white photography and darkroom technique, and became a commercial photographer, specializing in historical Indian pottery and Navajo jewelry. She also worked as a food stylist, collaborating on six cookbooks, including The Coyote Café Cookbook and The Red Sage Cookbook. She adapted her food styling experience to become a prop and food specialist for Hollywood films including The Astronaut's Wife, where part of her work involved creating elaborate food scenes. While in Santa Fe, Tavormina became fascinated by the work of Sarah McCarty, a Santa Fe-based still life painter and was introduced to the works of 17th century Old Master still-life painters Giovanna Garzoni and Maria Sibylla Merian.

Early in her career, Tavormina spent six years working at Sotheby's auction house in New York, surrounded by fine art. Returning to New York in the mid-2000s, after a period learning Italian and finding her ancestral roots in Sicily, Tavormina joined Sotheby's again, photographing works of art for their auction catalogues. Tavormina began experimenting and creating photographic images reminiscent of the still life art of Dutch, Italian and Spanish painters of the 17th century, including Francesco de Zurbarán, Giovanna Garzoni, Maria Sibylla Merian, and Willem Claesz Heda. By 2009, Tavormina had developed the lighting and composition style that forms the backbone of her Natura Morta series, and the work was shown publicly for the first time in 2009 at Sotheby's. Her first gallery show was the Still Seen group exhibition at Robert Klein Gallery in Boston in the fall of 2009. Tavormina's work has since been part of many solo and group exhibitions.

In addition to her fine-art photography, Tavormina has a successful career as a commercial photographer, including the "Alchemist's Garden" fragrance campaign for Gucci, and Goop's "edition 01" perfume. She has photographed recipes for the Del Posto Cookbook, The 1802 Beekman Heirloom Cookbook and The 1802 Beekman Heirloom Dessert Cookbook.

== Monograph ==
A monograph entitled Paulette Tavormina: Seizing Beauty was published in 2016 by The Monacelli Press. This 160-page volume incorporates plates of Tavormina's major works from the period 2008 to 2015 as well as essays by the art and photography scholars Silvia Malaguzzi, Mark Alice Durant and Anke Van Wagenberg-Ter Hoeven.

== Awards and grants ==
In August 2016, Tavormina was selected by the Pollock-Krasner Foundation as a 2016 recipient of a Pollock-Krasner grant.

In November 2010, Tavormina was awarded the Grand Prix of the Festival International de la Photographie Culinaire, a juried photography competition held annually in Paris, France.

== Solo museum exhibitions ==
- Snite Museum of Art, University of Notre Dame, South Bend, IN, August 21, 2016 – November 27, 2016
- Academy Art Museum, Easton, MD, April 23, 2016 – July 10, 2016

== Solo gallery exhibitions ==
- Portraits in Bloom, Winston Wächter Fine Art, New York, 2025
- Fiori del Giardino, Winston Wächter Fine Art, New York, 2024
- Fiori del Giardino, Winston Wächter Fine Art, New York, 2023
- Fiore del Giardino, Gilman Contemporary, Ketchum, ID, 2023
- Seizing Beauty, Gilman Contemporary, Ketchum, ID, 2022
- A Concert of Birds, Robert Mann Gallery, New York, NY, 2018
- Seizing Beauty, Colnaghi, Madrid, Spain, 2018
- Seizing Beauty, Colnaghi, London, England, 2017
- Paulette Tavormina, Beetles + Huxley Gallery, London, England, 2015
- Paulette Tavormina: Bogedón, Robert Mann Gallery, New York, 2015
- Bogedón Series by Paulette Tavormina, March SF, San Francisco, 2014
- Black & Bloom, A solo exhibition in two parts, Robert Klein Gallery, Boston MA, 2014
- Photographs, March SF, San Francisco, 2013
- Natura Morta, Robert Mann Gallery, New York, 2013
- Natura Morta, Polka Gallery, Paris, 2012
- Natura Morta, Robert Klein Gallery, Boston, 2010

== Selected group exhibitions ==
- Paulette Tavormina Photographs and Alicia Cheung Design, Château des Joncherets, Saint-Lubin-des-Joncherets, France, 2025
- Rooms with a View Designer Showcase, Southport Congregational Church, Southport, CT, 2025
- A New Dimension in Photography: The Vibrancy of Color and Light, Holden Luntz Gallery, Palm Beach, FL, 2025
- Come Together, Gilman Contemporary, Ketchum, ID, 2025
- Everyday Objects: The Enduring Appeal of Still Life, Boise Art Museum, Boise, ID, 2022
- Undying Traditions: Momento Mori, Muskegon Museum of Art, Muskegon, MI, 2020.
- The Garzoni Challenge, Uffizi Galleries, Florence, Italy, 2020.
- Garden Party, Catherine Couturier Gallery, Houston, TX, 2019.
- Sleep with the Fishes, Robert Mann Gallery, New York, NY, 2019.
- Birds of a Feather, Robert Mann Gallery, New York, NY, 2017.
- Still Life – The Pleasure of Stopping Time, Holden Luntz Gallery, Palm Beach, Florida, 2016.
- Month of Photography Denver: Playing with Beauty curated by Mark Sink, RedLine, Denver, Colorado, 2015
- Summer Photography Show, Stephanie Hoppen Gallery, London, England, 2014
- Fragile, Chris Beetles Fine Photographs, London, England, 2013
- An Artist's Delight: Revealing the Fantasies of Still Life, Alimentarium Museum, Vevey, Switzerland, 2014
- The Photographers 2011, Chris Beetles Fine Photographs, London, United Kingdom, 2011
- Natura Morta, Polka Gallery, Paris, 2011
- Natura Morta, Pobeda Gallery, Moscow, Russia, 2011
- Still Life Revisited, Everson Museum of Art, Syracuse, New York, 2011
- Food for Thought, Robert Mann Gallery, New York, New York, 2011
- Naturae Mortae: Master Photographers of the 20th Century, Photographica Fine Art, Lugano, Switzerland, 2010
- Through a Painter's Lens, Holden Luntz Gallery, Palm Beach Florida, 2009
- Still Seen, Robert Klein Gallery, Boston, MA, 2009,
