= Joan Moss =

American photographer (1931–2021)

Joan P. Moss (née Bloomenfeld; March 17, 1931 – March 1, 2021) was an American photographer.

== Life and career ==
Joan P. Bloomenfeld was born in Toronto, Canada, on March 17, 1931.

She began her career in photography in 1973, without any photographic training, by building a darkroom in her home. After a year of shooting with standard film, Moss began using infrared film to create the visual look she would become known for.

Her work is included in the collections of the National Gallery of Canada, the Museum of Contemporary Photography the Museum of Contemporary Art Chicago and the Museum of Fine Arts Houston.

Moss died on March 1, 2021, at the age of 89.
