= Cassandra Zampini =

American visual artist

Cassandra M. Zampini
- Born: 1983 (age 42–43)
- Education: Boston University
- Known for: Visual art, Screenprinting, Media art
- Website: https://www.cassandrazampini.com/

Cassandra M. Zampini (born 1983) is a New York City based American visual artist

== Early life and education ==
While at high school Zampini took portrait photographs of graduating seniors.

Mostly self-taught in photography, Zampini did study at Boston University when she took on a summer internship with New World Outlook she was sent to South America to write about and photograph on poverty and globalization. Zampini realized the impact that photography could have and that internship has shaped her work.

== Career ==
After the internship Zampini became the principal photographer for the parent company of New World Outlook where she managed campaign shoots. Her next job was as a photojournalist for a local newspaper in Connecticut, while also undertaking freelance work for companies at events, doing corporate events, and photo shoots.

Zampini's 2016 photographic essay The Commute appeared in the Atlantic magazine.

In 2018, the Facebook–Cambridge Analytica data scandal prompted Zampini to pivot her focus towards digital media. Also in 2018, her first show in New York City focused on her ongoing project, Data Mine. In 2020, she received critical attention for her 25-minute film Media Warfare, which condensed clips of fake news and conspiracy theories.

Her work is included in the collection of the Museum of Fine Arts, Houston, the University of Arizona's Center for Creative Photography, the Arnot Art Museum, the Griffin Museum of Photography in Winchester. She has exhibited her work at ArtYard in Frenchtown, as well as at various art galleries in Boston. Zampini was part of A Yellow Rose Project; a 2020 artistic reflection on the 100 year anniversary of the Nineteenth Amendment to the United States Constitution.

In 2022, Zampini was selected as a National Arts Club fellow, which provides an eighteen month residency.

== Personal life ==
Zampini is based in New York City. She is married, and has a brother who is an anthropologist.
