= Clara Sheldon Smith =

Clara Sheldon Smith (July 1862 – November 1939) was an American photographer based in California in the late 19th and early 20th century known for portrait photography and photographs of the Northern California landscape.

== Career ==
Clara Sheldon Smith set up the Ramona Art Studio in Marysville, California in the Sacramento Valley. Ramona Art Studio, initially based in a tent, focused on portraiture. At the turn of the century Smith had a contract with the city of Marysville to photograph its prisoners. From 1900 to 1908 she photographed over 500 local criminals. After the 1906 San Francisco earthquake, Smith documented the damage in a panoramic photograph which she shot from high up in a helium-filled balloon. In 1908 Smith sold her studio to C.C. Green and retired from photography.

== Collections ==
Smith's work is held in permanent collections including:

- The Bancroft Library, University of California, Berkeley, Berkeley, California
- Community Memorial Museum of Sutter County, Yuba City, California

== Legacy ==
Clara Sheldon Smith's photographs of Marysville criminals have been compiled, and paired with archival research into the lives of her subjects, a book titled Prisoners. Photographs from this series are also featured in the 2026 documentary film Crime and Punishment in America produced by Lynn Novick and Ken Burns.
