= Sandra Stark =

American photographer

Sandra Stark (born 1951) is an American photographer.

She began working at the School of the Museum of Fine Arts at Tufts in 1980. She retired from teaching in 2021.

Her work is included in the collections of the Museum of Fine Arts Houston, the Boston Museum of Fine Arts and the Fogg Museum at Harvard University.
