= Dawn Wirth =

American photographer (born 1960)

Dawn Wirth (born January 1960) is an American photographer, who is one of the handful to document the "first wave" of the Los Angeles punk rock scene. Her initial work was, among other things, for various fanzines such as Flipside, Sniffin' Glue, Gen X and White Stuff, and to create flyers for unsigned local bands and work with two fanclubs, the Mumps and the Weirdos. In 1978, the day after graduating from high school, she flew to London and lived there for six months.

Wirth has exhibited at Claremont Museum of Art in Los Angeles and at DRKRM. Gallery in Claremont, CA. She has published two photo books, The Bags – Hollywood Forever and The Weirdos. She also in 2015 published her first children's book, Cabella: The Service Dog.
