= Judy Bankhead =

American photographer (born 1951)

- Known for: Photography

Judy Bankhead (born 1951) is an American photographer, based in Texas.

Her work is included in the collections of the Museum of Fine Arts Houston and the Tyler Museum of Art.

== Bibliography ==
- My Town. Tyler, Texas: Tyler Museum of Art, 1981.
- At the Edge of Town. Victoria, Texas: The Nave Museum, 1985.
- San Antonio Project, 1976-1991. San Antonio, Texas: Southwest Craft Center, 1993.
