= Esther Parada =

American photographer (1938–2005)

- Born: 1938; Grand Rapids, Michigan
- Died: October 19, 2005 (aged 66–67); Chicago, Illinois

Esther Parada (1938–2005) was an American photographer, activist, teacher, and author.

== Early life and education ==
Parada received a Bachelor of Arts degree in art history, literature, and history from Swarthmore College in 1960. In 1971, she began studies at the Chicago Institute of Design.

== Career ==
In the mid-1960s, Parada went to Bolivia as a Peace Corps volunteer. The photographs she took there became a significant part of her work.

From 1974 to 2005, she was a professor of photography at the University of Illinois Chicago's School of Art and Design.

Her work is included in the collection of the Museum of Fine Arts Houston, the Minneapolis Institute of Art, the Yale University Art Gallery, and the Art Institute of Chicago.
