= Monika Merva =

American photographer

Monika Merva (born 1969) is an American photographer.

Her work is included in the collection of the Museum of Fine Arts Houston, the Worcester Art Museum and the Brooklyn Museum.
