= Nancy M. Stuart =

American photographer

- Education: Ph.D., University at Buffalo, The State University of New York
- Style: Portrait photographer

Dr. Nancy M. Stuart is an American portrait photographer, photography educator, and academic administrator. She is the dean of the University of Hartford's art school.

== Education ==
She received a Ph.D. from the University at Buffalo in 2005; her dissertation was titled The History of Photographic Education in Rochester, N.Y. 1960–1980. Stuart also wrote the chapter "Photographic Higher Education in the United States" in The Focal Encyclopedia of Photography.

== Career ==
From 1975 to 1984, Stuart was a founding faculty member of the Photo Technology Program at Lansing Community College. She has served as provost of the Cleveland Institute of Art and as an associate dean at the Rochester Institute of Technology.

Her work DES Stories: Faces and Voices of People Exposed to Diethylstilbestrol was published in 2001 and exhibited in the United States.

== See also ==
- List of women photographers
