= Stacy Pearsall =

American photographer (born 1980)

Stacy L. Pearsall
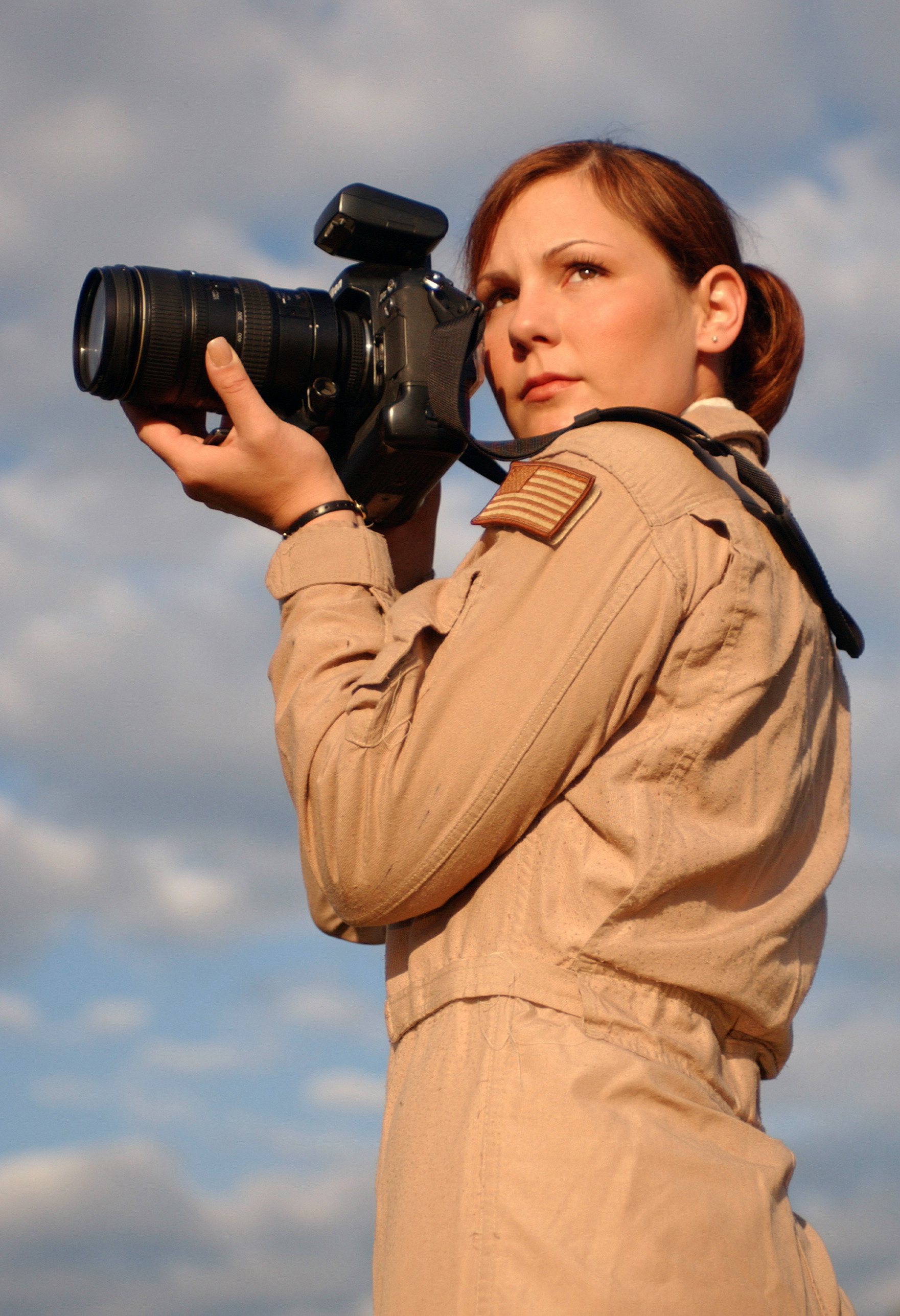
- Pearsall in 2004 photo by Bethann Caporaletti
- Born: 1980 (age 45–46); Corpus Christi, Texas
- Military career
- Branch: United States Air Force
- Service years: 1997–2008
- Rank: Staff Sergeant
- Unit: 1st Combat Camera Squadron
- Battle for Baqubah: Operation Iraqi Freedom and Operation Enduring Freedom
- Awards: Bronze Star Medal, Air Medal, Joint Service Commendation Medal, Air Force Commendation Medal with Valor, Air Force Combat Action Medal, Joint Service Achievement Medal, Army Achievement Medal, Joint Meritorious Unit Award, Meritorious Unit Award, Air Force Outstanding Unit Award with Valor Device, Combat Readiness Medal, Air Force Good Conduct Medal, National Defense Service Medal, Iraqi Campaign Medal, Global War on Terrorism Expeditionary Medal, Global War on Terrorism Service Medal, Air Force Overseas Ribbon Short, Air Force Expeditionary Service Medal with Gold Border, Air Force Longevity Service Medal, NCO PME Graduate Ribbon, Small Arms Marksmanship Ribbon Pistol, John Levitow Award, Joint Service Junior Member of the Year
- Other work: Founder of the Veterans Portrait Project, Owner/Director of the Charleston Center for Photography, Speaker for Bravo748, Producer and Host of After Action television series, Owner of LowCountry Acres

Stacy L. Pearsall is an American photographer. Pearsall served as a military photographer in the United States Air Force until her wounds lead to her medical retirement. Since leaving the Air Force, Pearsall has worked as a professional photographer.

== Biography ==
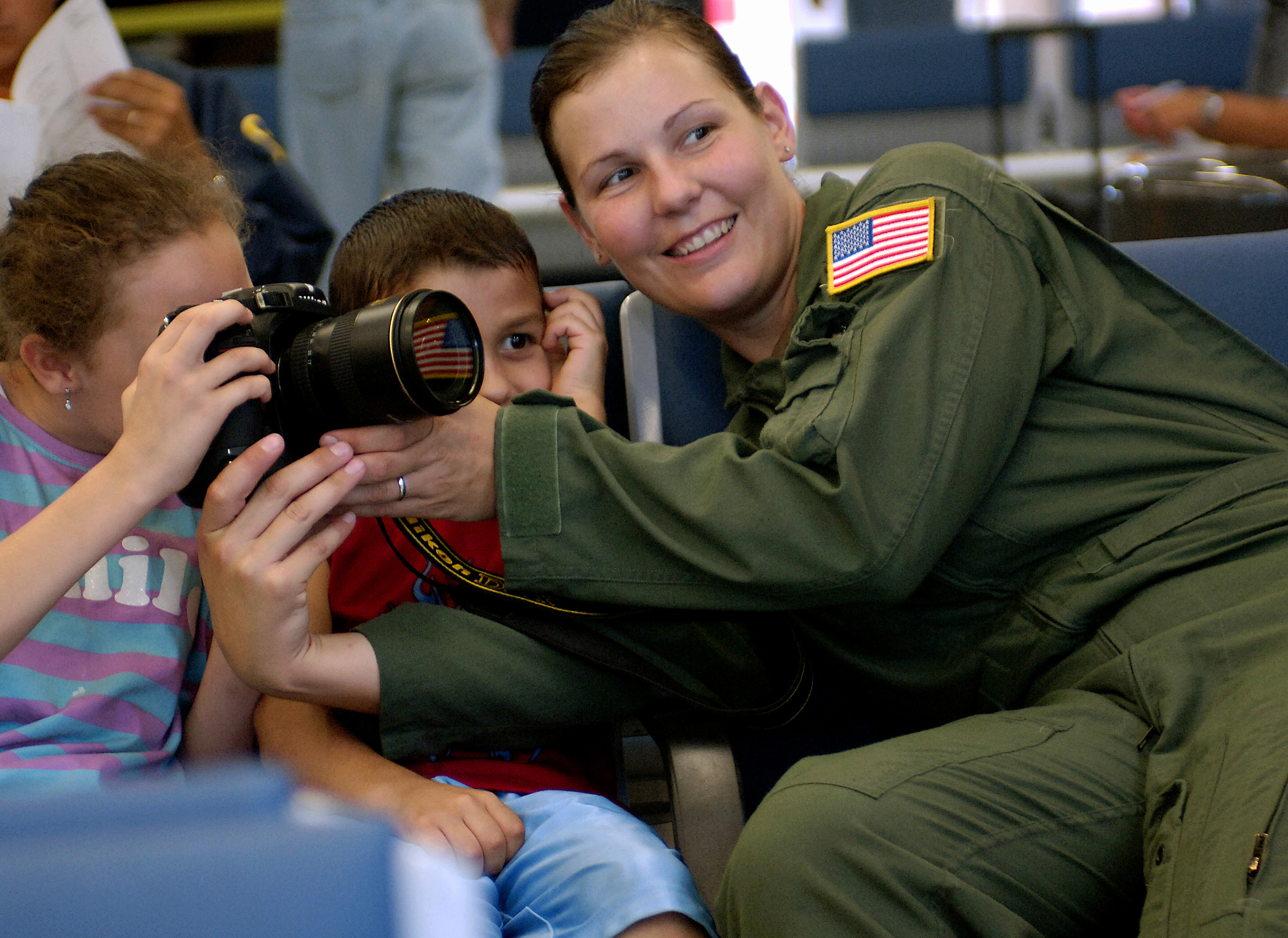
U.S. Air Force Staff Sgt. Stacy Pearsall, from the 1st Combat Camera Squadron, shows American children how to capture an image inside the terminal on Ramstein Air Base, Germany, July 22, 2006. The Air Force is flying American citizens who departed Lebanon to the United States. (U.S. Air Force photo by Tech. Sgt. Russell E. Cooley IV) (Released)

Pearsall enlisted in the U.S. Air Force at age 17 as a Basic Still Photographer. Upon graduating from the Defense Information School in 1998, she was assign to U.S. Strategic Command at Offutt Air Force Base, NE, followed by the European Command, Joint Analysis Center at RAF Molesworth in the United Kingdom, where she served as a U-2 High Altitude Reconnaissance Aircraft long-roll processor. In 2001, she applied and was accepted to the 1st Combat Camera Squadron (COMCAM) in Charleston, SC. During her two consecutive tours, she certified as aircrew and traveled to more than 41 countries and completed the Military Photojournalism program at the S.I. Newhouse School of Public Communications at Syracuse University.

Pearsall first entered combat as an aerial combat photographer in Iraq in 2003. On average, Pearsall spent 280 days a year covering humanitarian relief missions, as well as aerial and ground combat operations with the Air Force, Army, Marine Corps and Navy. Her images were used by the President, Secretary of Defense, and Joint Chiefs of Staff to make informed decisions in the battle space. She went on to earn the Bronze Star Medal, two Air Force Commendation Medals (one with Valor) and two Air Medals for her actions in Iraq during three combat tours. Pearsall is a two-time National Press Photographers Association (NPPA) at Military Photographer of the Year winner; becoming one of only two women to do so.

While Pearsall was under roughly 18 months of rehabilitation for the combat injuries that she sustained in Iraq, she spent a long time in waiting rooms surrounded by veterans whom she wished to honor and thank through photography. She founded the Veterans Portrait Project in 2008 and has since photographed and documented about 8,500 veterans in all 50 states and held many exhibitions showing the work of veterans in their hometowns. Her work has been exhibited at the Smithsonian National Portrait Gallery, National Veterans Memorial and Museum, Women in Military Service for American Memorial, and the Woodruff Arts Center among many others.

Upon her medical retirement from active duty service in 2008, Pearsall began working for the Charleston Center for Photography and assumed ownership and direction in 2009. She has also served as a nomination juror for the Pulitzer Prize and held a position in the advisory board of the School of Humanities and Social Sciences at The Citadel since 2009. Pearsall has also been awarded the Carolinas Freedom Foundation Freedom Award, lauded by the White House as a Champion Change, given the Daughters of the American Revolution Margaret Cochran Corbin Award, and holds an honorary doctoral degree from the Citadel. Pearsall has completed two books of photography Shooter: Combat from Behind the Camera and A Photojournalist's Field Guide She is the founder or the Veterans Portrait Project.

In 2017, Pearsall was awarded a service dog from America's VetDogs on the TODAY Show. Her service animal, Charlie, was raised and trained on-set to highlight the benefits of service dogs for disabled veterans. Together, Pearsall and Charlie have traveled to over 19 states, including Hawaii and Alaska, to engage in public speaking events and the Veterans Portrait Project.

In 2022, Pearsall became the Producer and Host of the national PBS television series, After Action, which is available on local PBS stations, PBS Plus and PBS Passport. After Action is a show that reveals the experiences of 21 diverse veterans from across the U.S. through candid conversations about what life is like before, during and after action. Pearsall’s own struggles to reconnect with society challenges her fellow veterans to probe deeper into their stories, helping to provide a better appreciation for those who’ve served.

Pearsall, and her husband Andy Dunaway, also a retired combat photographer, now live on a farm, LowCountry Acres, in Harleyville, South Carolina, where they breed, raise and train rare European Brabant draft horses.
