= Beatrice Tonnesen =

American photographer (1871–1958)

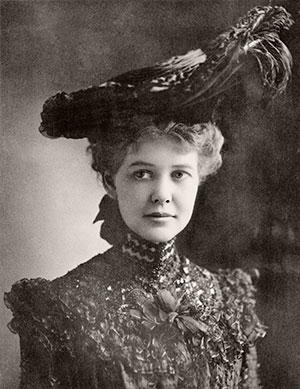
Beatrice Tonnesen, self-portrait, approximately 1900.

Beatrice Tonnesen (January 24, 1871 - May 12, 1958) was an American artist and photographer based in Chicago, Illinois, from approximately 1896 to 1930. She is credited with having pioneered the use of photographs of live models in print advertising. In addition, her photos, and illustrations by leading artists based on her photos, were widely used in the calendar art of the era.

== Early life ==
Beatrice Tonnesen was born June 24, 1871, in Winneconne, Wisconsin, to Tonnes Tonnesen and Mary Sumner Tonnesen. Beatrice, who was hearing impaired, studied photography under Cook Ely, Oshkosh, Wisconsin's leading photographer of the day, and at the Oshkosh Normal School. Tonnes Tonnesen was an immigrant from Norway, and one of the representative pioneer business men of Winnebago County, Wisconsin. Mary Sumner Tonnesen was a direct descendant of William Sumner of Bicester, England, who came to New England in 1636 and settled in Dorchester, Massachusetts.

== Career ==
In 1895, Tonnesen opened her first photographic art studio in Menominee, Michigan. While operating that studio, Tonnesen traveled to Chicago and arranged to purchase the business and studio of a prominent society photographer, Simon L. Stein, at 1301 Michigan Avenue. Her widowed sister, Clara Tonnesen Kirkpatrick, invested in the project and relocated to Chicago to handle the business aspects of her sister's new venture. Tonnesen quickly became a favorite portrait photographer of many of Chicago's most prominent families, including the Armours, Pullmans, and Palmers. But portrait photography did not remain her only specialty for long. She and her sister Clara soon hit upon an idea that was to revolutionize the world of print advertising. As Tonnesen herself put it in an interview with the Oshkosh Daily Northwestern in 1954: "One day we thought up a fine scheme. We would make advertising pictures using live models, which had never been done before." The idea took off, and Tonnesen and her "Famous Tonnesen Models" gained nationwide fame. A 1903 advertisement "Introducing The Famous Tonnesen Models" proclaimed, "We operate the largest Photographic Print establishment in America."

At the same time, Tonnesen was cultivating a specialty in calendar art. Creating photos of appealing family scenes, as well as more risque (for the time) studies of beautiful ingenues and glamorous flappers, Tonnesen sold her work not only to advertisers, but also to publishers and artists. A November 18, 1896, article in the Chicago Daily Tribune titled "Ideas for Dull Artists" outlined the various uses of Tonnesen's photos: Advertisers often used them with little or no alteration; publishers often assigned staff illustrators to embellish or paint them using water color, pastels or oils; and independent artists painted from them, capitalizing on Tonnesen's talent for posing and composition, in order to meet the demands of the rapidly expanding art publishing trade. Two of the era's more successful calendar artists, R. Atkinson Fox (1860–1935) and Homer S. Nelson (no dates), who specialized in romanticized depictions of Indian maidens, are among artists known to have painted from Tonnesen's photos.

Her very early work was signed "Tonnesen Sisters". But throughout most of her career, because she sold so much of her work to others for their own use, her name or signature seldom appeared on the final product. Those relatively few pieces which she painted from her own photographs were signed "Beatrice Tonnesen", and can still be found on calendars from approximately 1900 to 1930. Although she is known to have taken thousands of images throughout her career, no original glass plate negatives have ever been located. Small collections of original photos, paintings and prints are all that are known to remain. Most of the original photos are located at the Oshkosh Public Museum and the Winneconne Historical Society. Some few art researchers, relatives of persons associated with Tonnesen during her career, and historians are known to have collections, and a digital collection is retained at the Beatrice Tonnesen website. Her personal scrapbook was restored for the Oshkosh Public Museum and made available for study.

== Other innovations ==
In addition to creating the first photographs of live models for print advertising and supplying the robust calendar trade of the era with decorative artwork, Tonnesen was an inventor. She is known to have patented a sewing machine cabinet and a holder for long-stem flowers. She also developed a photographic means to produce silhouette portraits and a process for creating sculptures she called "Mars Ware" from furnace clinkers. A 1949 documentary Unusual Occupations featured Tonnesen and her Mars Ware.

== Later life ==
In 1930, Tonnesen, who never married, closed her studio in Chicago and moved back to Winneconne Wisconsin, where she shared her sister Clara's home until Clara's death in 1944. By the early 1950s, she was living in Oshkosh, Wisconsin, at the St. Mary's Home, where she continued to pursue her art interests, creating jewelry and sculptures. She died there on May 12, 1958.
