= Anne Rearick =

American photographer (born 1960)

Anne Rearick (born 1960) is an American photographer. In 2003 she was awarded a Guggenheim Fellowship and in 2014 the Prix Roger-Pic. Her work is held in the collection of the San Francisco Museum of Modern Art.

== Early life and education ==
Rearick was born in Caldwell, Idaho. She received a Master of Fine Arts degree from the Massachusetts College of Art and Design.

== Publications ==
- Anne Rearick's Eye: Miresicoletea. Paris: Atlantica, Paris, 2004. With texts by Bernardo Atxaga, Gabriel Bauret, and Christian Caujolle. ISBN 9782843946479. French edition.
- Township. Clémentine de la Férroniere, 2016. ISBN 9782954226651.
- Sète #17. With a preface by Christian Caujolle. Bec en air; CéTàVoir, 2017. ISBN 9782367441122.
- La France vue d'ici. Paris: Martinière; ImageSingulières; Médiapart, 2017. ISBN 9782732477725.
- You Will Look to the Mountains. Deadbeat Club, 2023. ISBN 978-1-952523-10-6.
- Gure Bazterrak (Our Land). Deadbeat Club, 2024.

== Films ==
- Jean Dieuzade, Regards en Partage (2014) – French documentary about Jean Dieuzaide and humanist photography that includes Rearick

== Awards ==
- 2003: Guggenheim Fellowship from the John Simon Guggenheim Memorial Foundation
- 2014: Prix Roger-Pic, Civil Society of Multimedia Authors, France

== Collections ==
Rearick's work is held in the following permanent collection:

- San Francisco Museum of Modern Art, San Francisco, CA: 2 prints (as of 29 September 2023)
