= Whitney Hubbs =

American photographer (born 1977)

Whitney Hubbs (born 1977) is an American photographer. Her work is held in the collections of the J. Paul Getty Museum and UCR/California Museum of Photography.

== Early life and education ==
Hubbs was born and raised in Los Angeles, California. She graduated with a degree in photography from California College of the Arts in 2005 and received an MFA from the University of California, Los Angeles in 2009.

== Life and work ==
With the series Body Doubles, "she photographed women in various states of undress, their faces obscured by a variety of textured papers and fabrics in bold colors" "in poses that defy the conventional language of nude photography." "The series was her way of showering off the male gaze by looking at women through her own eyes."

Her book Say So (2021) contains self-portraits that could, in the words of Chris Wiley writing in frieze, "be superficially described as sadomasochistic erotica, since they feature Hubbs in a variety of compromising position and in various states of undress." However, "when we plumb their depths, these pictures reveal themselves as being less about titillation and more about universal, close-to-the-bone emotional struggles..."

Hubbs is the associate director of Light Work in Syracuse, NY.

== Publications ==
- Woman In Motion. Los Angeles: Hesse, 2017. ISBN 9780997697322.
- Say So. London: Self Publish, Be Happy, 2021. ISBN 9781916041219. With an essay by Chris Kraus. Edition of 1000 copies.

== Solo exhibitions ==
- Whitney Hubbs, Situations, New York City, 2020

== Collections ==
Hubbs' work is held in the following permanent collections:

- J. Paul Getty Museum, Los Angeles, CA: 5 prints (as of 26 March 2022)
- UCR/California Museum of Photography, College of Humanities, Arts, and Social Sciences at University of California, Riverside, CA: 1 print (as of 26 March 2022)
