= Rachel Cox (photographer) =

American photographer

- Born: 1984 (age 40–41)
- Known for: photography
- Website: www.rachelcoxphotography.com

Rachel Cox (born 1984) is an American photographer based in Iowa City, Iowa. She is an associate professor of photography at the University of Iowa.

== Early life and education ==
Cox received her MFA in photography from the University of New Mexico.

== Career ==
In her project Shiny Ghost, she photographically documented her relationship with her dying grandmother. Her project Mors Scena utilized the physical spaces used to grieve deaths in the United States as its subject.

Cox's work is held in the collections of the Museum of Contemporary Photography, Chicago, and the Museum of Fine Arts Houston.

== Personal life ==
Cox lives in Iowa City with her partner Matt. They have one daughter.
