= Ann Mandelbaum =

American artist and photographer

Ann Mandelbaum (born 1945) is an American artist and photographer. She has an MA in Media Studies from The New School and an MFA from Pratt Institute in Painting and Drawing. She retired in 2021 after over 40 years teaching Fine Art and Photography at Pratt Institute.

Her 4th monograph, Matter, will be published by Hatje Cantz in 2022. It offers both analog black and white work from 1990-2000 and digital color images from 2007–present. None of the 105 examples have been exhibited or published before. The richness of the volume is in the 35-year process delineated. It reveals a continual obsession with the organic world, weaving through abstraction and sensation. Using both darkroom manipulation and later digital layers - Mandelbaum consistently reinvents and rediscovers a language of surprise. It follows 3 others: Ann Mandelbaum [ edition Stemmele 1994], Ann Mandelbaum, New Work[ Edition Stemmle, 1999], and Thin Skin[ Hatje Cantz, 2006].

She had had over 20 solo international exhibitions in museums and galleries including: Grey Art Gallery, New York; Southeastern Center for Photography, Winston Salem; Center for Creative Photography, Tucson; Frankfurter Kunstverein; Musee del'Elysee, Lausanne; Arge Kunst, Bolzano; Fotomuseum, Munich, Canal Isabel, Madrid; Galerie Francoise Paviot, Paris; Galerie Anita Beckers, Frankfurt; Rena Bransten, San Francisco; Jane Jackson, Atlanta.

In 2005, Hatje Cantz Verlag released a monograph on her work. She is included in the collection of the National Gallery of Canada, the Houston Museum of Fine Arts, the Brooklyn Museum and the Center for Creative Photography.
