= Karen Halverson =

American photographer

Karen Halverson (born 1941) is an American photographer.

== Education ==
She received a BA degree in philosophy from Stanford University in 1963. In 1965 she received an MA degree in the History of Ideas from Brandeis University, followed by an MA in Anthropology from Columbia University in 1975.

== Publications ==
- Downstream: Encounters with the Colorado River. University of California Press, 2008. ISBN 978-0520253469.

== Collections ==
- Brooklyn Museum
- Getty Museum
- Los Angeles County Museum of Art
- Milwaukee Art Museum
- Museum of Fine Arts, Houston
- Smithsonian American Art Museum
