= Keliy Anderson-Staley =

American photographer

Keliy Anderson-Staley (born 1977) is a 20th-century American photographer, artist, and educator based in Houston. She is known for her tintype portraits and teaches photography and digital media at the University of Houston.

== Life ==
Keliy Anderson-Staley grew up "off the grid" in Maine in an isolated cabin in the woods and made up her name's spelling when she was 11. She received her BA from Hampshire College and her MFA from Hunter College. Anderson-Staley joined the faculty at the University of Houston in 2013.

== Artist works ==
Anderson-Staley's work explores cultural identity, history, and narrative structure, and she is known for her tintype portraiture. She uses replicas of 150-year-old cameras with the chemical process wet plate collodion. These wooden view cameras and brass lenses have exposures that take ten to 30 seconds.

== Publications ==
- On a Wet Bough. Waltz Books, 2014. 978-1-939932-00-6.

== Awards and recognition ==
- 2022: Guggenheim Fellowship
- 2014: Carol Crow Memorial Fellowship
- 2012: George and Eliza Gardner Howard Foundation Fellow
- 2008: New York Foundation for the Arts Fellow
