= Sally Gall =

American photographer

Sally Gall (born 1956) is an American photographer.

Her work is included in the collections of the Whitney Museum of American Art, the RISD Museum, the Tufts University Art Galleries, the Museum of Fine Arts Houston, the Brooklyn Museum, and the Bates Museum of Art.
