= Barbara DuMetz =

American photographer

- Born: 1947; Charleston, West Virginia, U.S.
- Occupation: Photographer
- Awards: CEBA Awards, LULU Award

External videos
- The Barbara DuMetz Photography Exhibit, Fisk University
- "Barbara DuMetz Profile Video", Spencer Glover & Malcolm Voltaire

Barbara DuMetz (born 1947) is an American photographer and pioneer in the field of commercial photography. She began working in Los Angeles as a commercial photographer in the 1970s, when very few women had established and maintained successful careers in the field, especially African-American women. Over the course of her career, "she made a major contribution to diversifying the landscape of images that defined pop culture in the United States."

DuMetz is known for her work with African-American celebrities, corporations and images of everyday life in African-American communities. She has won three CEBA awards and a LULU award for her commercial photography. Group shows have included her work in Atlanta, Chicago, Los Angeles and New York City. Retrospectives of her work have appeared at the Carl Van Vechten Gallery at Fisk University in 2014 and at Texas Southern University.

== Early life ==
DuMetz was born in Charleston, West Virginia, the only girl and second of four children to Eustace T. DuMetz, II, DDS and Constance R. (née Brooks). Her grandfather, Eustace DuMetz, was a free-lance photographer who worked for the Pittsburgh Courier and Charleston Gazette.

When DuMetz was five years old, her family moved to Detroit where she attended school, graduating from Central High School. She attended Fisk University in Nashville, Tennessee, majoring in psychology. While attending Fisk university She became a member of Pi chapter of Alpha Kappa Alpha sorority. After graduating from Fisk University in 1969, she attended the Art Center College of Design, now located in Pasadena, California.

== Career ==
DuMetz has been a professional photographer for more than four decades. Over the course of her career, she has produced award-winning images for advertising agencies including Burrell Advertising, J. P. Martin Associates and InterNorth Corporation. Her photographs have appeared in African-American publications including Black Enterprise, Ebony, Essence, Jet and The Crisis. She has taken commercial photographs for corporations including The Coca-Cola Company, Delta Air Lines and McDonald's Corporation.

DuMetz ran and maintained three different photography studios located in the Los Angeles area where she was contracted by department stores, record companies, graphic design studios, advertising agencies, public relations firms, film production companies, actors and business professionals. DuMetz's has shot photo layouts of celebrities and artists and personalities including Maya Angelou, Ernie Barnes, Bernie Casey, Pam Grier, Kareem Abdul-Jabbar, Quincy Jones, Samella Lewis, Ed McMahan, Thelonious Monk, Lou Rawls, Della Reese, Richard Roundtree, Betye Saar, Charles Wilbert White, and Nancy Wilson. Her show The Creators: Photographic Images of Literary, Music and Visual Artists, at the Southwest Arts Center in Atlanta, Georgia, in 2015, included images of over two dozen African-American artists whom she has photographed.

DuMetz's work was included in the 2025 exhibition Photography and the Black Arts Movement, 1955–1985 at the National Gallery of Art.
