= Constance Philpitt Warner =

Nature photographer (1897–1992)

- Born: May 20, 1897; Hyattsville, Maryland, U.S.
- Died: June 10, 1992 (aged 95); Fort Lauderdale, Florida, U.S.
- Occupations: Nurse, nature photographer

Constance Philpitt Warner (May 25, 1897 – June 10, 1992) was a photographer who specialized in natural history photography and worked with the Smithsonian's National Zoo.

== Biography ==
Warner was born in Hyattsville, Maryland, United States, on May 25, 1897. She studied nursing and worked as a nurse before turning to photography. Through her marriage to Dr. Carden Warner who was an eye specialist, she developed interest in the natural protections within the structure of animals' eyes that help prevent injury.

After 1947, Warner took up photography and photographed a wide variety of animals at zoos around the world, chiefly at the National Zoo where she was based. Warner's photographs are included in a collection of slides in the Smithsonian Institution Archives. In the 1965 annual report, the Smithsonian identified Warner as an "honorary collaborator" to recognize the photographic work she had done and offered to the zoo for use in publication. Her photography also appears in publications such as National Geographic magazine, Life, and Reader's Digest.

Warner died in Fort Lauderdale, Florida, on June 10, 1992.
