= Stephanie Pfriender Stylander =

American photographer

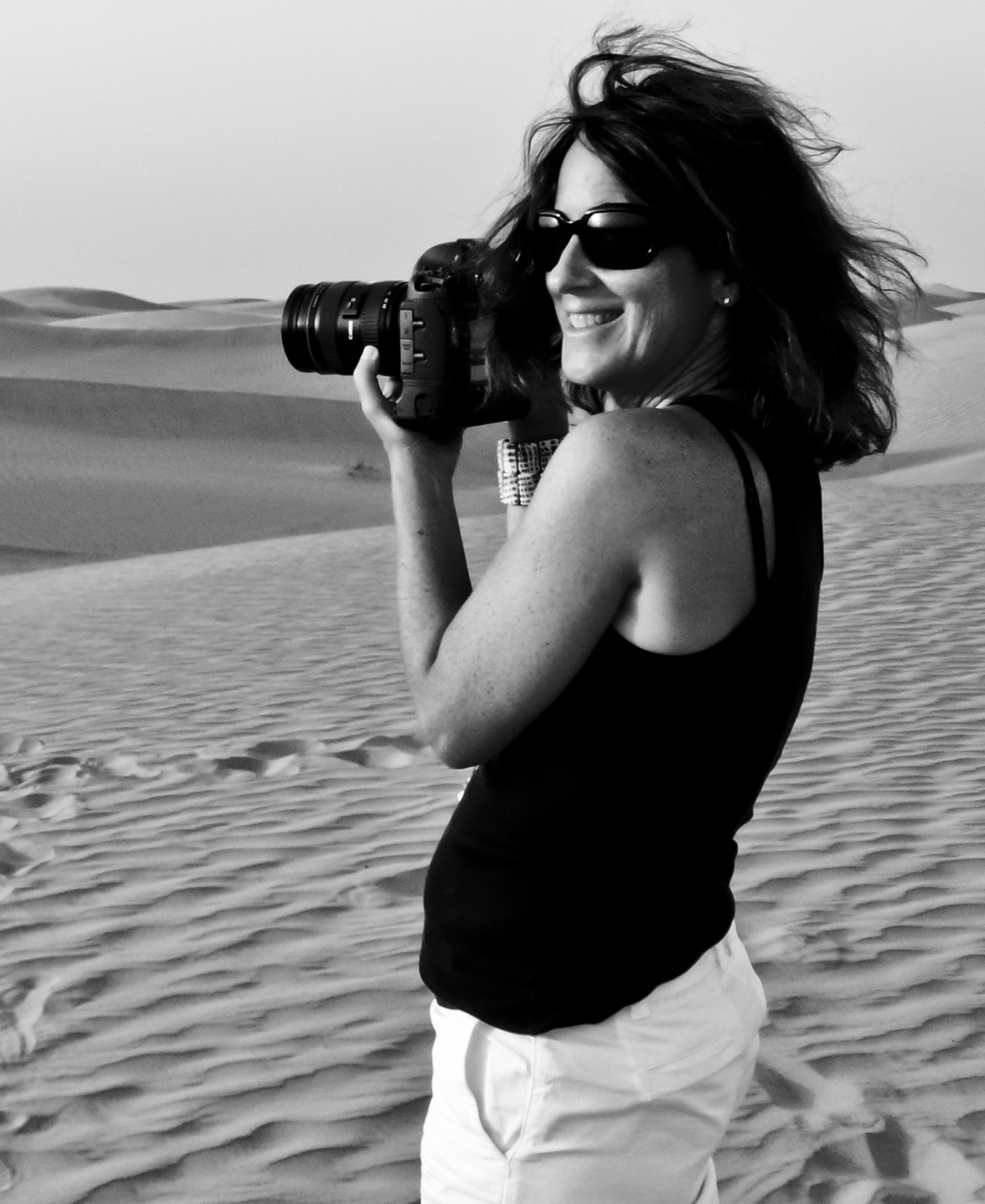
- Born: February 11, 1960 (age 66)
- Education: School of Visual Arts and Endicott College
- Known for: Photography

Stephanie Pfriender Stylander (born 1960) is an American fashion and entertainment portrait photographer.

== Early life ==
Stylander was raised in Glen Rock, New Jersey. She studied at the School of Visual Arts and Endicott College, receiving a Bachelor of Fine Arts and an Associate of Science in photography, respectively.After graduating, she worked as an assistant to photographer Art Kane in New York City. She began her photography career in the early 1990s after moving to Milan and Paris.

== Career ==
Pfriender Stylander's photographs have been widely published in magazines throughout the world, British GQ, Conde Nast Traveler, French Glamour, Interview, Newsweek, Vanity Fair, and Vogue. She photographed entertainment legends, such as Bjork, Sheryl Crow, Aretha Franklin, John Hurt, Samuel L Jackson, Lenny Kravitz, Nicole Kidman, Heath Ledger, Jennifer Lopez, and Keith Richards. Her most notable shoot is of a young Kate Moss' photographed in a fashion editorial story for Harper's Bazaar Uomo, 1992.

Currently, Staley-Wise Gallery, New York, is featuring Pfriender Stylander photographs in a joint exhibition "2 Women of Style". Her photographs have been included in exhibitions at Photo London 2019, Photo Basel 2019, Festival International de la Photo de Mode, Art Basel Miami, Paris Photo 2019, Photo Shanghai, and are housed in private collections.

Pfriender Stylander is represented by the Staley-Wise Gallery in New York, Ira Stehmann Fine Art in Munich, and Galerie Sophie Scheidecker in Paris. She and her husband reside in New York City.

== Publication ==
- The Untamed Eye. Publisher: MW Editions. Printed in Italy, 2018. ISBN 978-0-998-7018-2-0. Pages: 168; 138 color and black and white photographs.
