= Sarah Louise Judd =

American photographer (1802–1881)

- Born: June 29, 1802 June 26, 1802; Farmington, Connecticut
- Died: October 11, 1881 (aged 79); Stillwater, Minnesota
- Resting place: Fairview Cemetery, Stillwater
- Known for: Photography
- Spouse: Ariel Eldridge (m. 1849)

Sarah Louise Judd (June 26, 1802 – October 11, 1881) was the first commercial photographer in Minnesota. She also established the first schools in the area of Stillwater, Minnesota.

== Biography ==
Born in Farmington, Connecticut on June 26, 1802. In 1838 became her family became stockholders in a new company located in Maine Mills in 1844. she moved first to Marine, Illinois, (c. 1832) before settling in Stillwater, Minnesota in 1845. She founded the first schools at Point Douglas, Minnesota (1845) and Stillwater (1846). She was the first teacher in and Washington County. Mrs. Judd is known for starting to produce daguerrotypes in the spring of 1848 and continued in Stillwater two years. This is the earliest recorded production of photography in Minnesota. In January 1849 she married Ariel Eldridge (1816–1896). She also taught at the first school in Marine Mills, Minnesota in 1849. She was an entrepreneur that aided in her husband's bookstore and active in the local First Presbyterian Church. She died in her home in Stillwater. Sources list her death date as either October 11, 1881 or October 10, 1886
