= Sylvia de Swaan =

American visual artist and photographer

- Born: 1941; Chernivtsi, Romania now Ukraine
- Died: December 7, 2023 (aged 81–82); Warsaw, New York
- Known for: Photography
- Website: sylviadeswaan.net

Sylvia de Swaan (1941-2023) was an American photographer.

Swaan was born in Chernivtsi, Romania in 1941. She emigrated to the United States in 1952 and studied at Hunter College and the Art Students League of New York. Swaan lived and worked in Mexico, Europe, and the United States, settling in central New York. Her work is included in the New York Heritage digital collection.

For a time she was the director of Sculpture Space in Utica.

Swaan died on December 7, 2023 in Warsaw, New York.
