= Mary Frey =

American photographer and educator

Mary E. Frey (born 1948) is an American photographer and educator who lives in western Massachusetts. Her staged scenes of mundane middle-class life, using family, friends and strangers, which appear to be documentary at first sight, are intended to address "the nature of the documentary image in contemporary culture."

In 1984 Frey had a solo exhibition at the Hudson River Museum and was awarded a Guggenheim Fellowship. Her work has been shown in group exhibitions at the Museum of Modern Art in New York, and held in the collection there and at the Art Institute of Chicago and Museum of Fine Arts, Houston.

== Early life and education ==
Frey grew up in Yonkers, a borough of New York City. She was the oldest of 6 children.

She earned an MFA from Yale School of Art, Yale University in 1979.

== Photography ==
Frey makes staged scenes of mundane middle-class life, using family, friends and strangers, which appear to be documentary at first sight. She has said:

I was interested in how the best pictures create their own fictions, I considered all my subjects (whether they were friends or strangers) my "cast of characters" who were complicit in whatever I did. My working method was to set up my camera and either wait for something to happen or simply direct my subjects to recreate an action or moment, as if they were truly engaged in their activities… For me, the most interesting photographs hover somewhere between feeling documentary and set-up, thus questioning the inherent "truth" of the photographic image.

The series Domestic Rituals is composed of black and white work made between 1979 and 1983 using a 4×5 large format camera and diffuse flashbulb lighting. Mark Steinmetz wrote in Time that these photographs "seem quite naturalistic, but are in part staged by the photographer, and she avoids the temptation to romanticize." William Zimmer, reviewing an exhibition of Domestic Rituals in The New York Times, wrote that "how she captures [. . .] her large cast of characters [. . .] going about their lives without them being self-conscious in her presence, is the real marvel." Originally made for gallery walls rather than for book format, the work was published as Reading Raymond Carver in 2017. She has said:

My use of large format film insures the fact that every detail in a scene will be described with painful accuracy and the open flash I use illuminates these surfaces with a neutral, democratic light, so no detail takes precedence over another, giving everything in my scenes equal visual weight.

Real Life Dramas is colour work in the same vein as her previous work, made between 1984 and 1987 using a medium format camera. Originally when exhibited, the images were paired with captions. The captions "come from the paperback romances that the women she photographs presumably read, and her choice of captions is invariably both apt and funny. [. . .] Though her witty texts seem appropriate to the pictures, they are actually ... [not] revealing of her subjects' actual thoughts". When this work was published as a book in 2018, the strict pairings of text and image were abandoned, but the phrases still included throughout.

== Educator ==
After her MFA, she accepted a full-time position teaching photography at Hartford Art School, University of Hartford, where she stayed for 35 years, retiring in 2015.

== Publications ==
- Imagining Fauna. Self-published, 2014. ISBN 978-1389035029.
- Domestic Rituals. Blue Sky Book 9. Portland: Blue Sky, 2014.
- Reading Raymond Carver. Berlin: Peperoni, 2017. ISBN 978-3-941249-12-7.
- Real Life Dramas. Berlin: Peperoni, 2018. ISBN 978-3941249271. With an essay by Tim Carpenter.
- My Mother, My Son. TBW, 2024. ISBN 978-1-942953-54-8.

== Awards ==
- 1984: Guggenheim Fellowship from the John Simon Guggenheim Memorial Foundation

== Collections ==
Frey's work is held in the following permanent collections:

- Art Institute of Chicago, Chicago, IL: 2 prints (as of April 2021)
- Museum of Fine Arts, Houston, Houston, TX: 1 print (as of April 2021)
- Museum of Modern Art, New York: 9 prints (as of April 2021)

== Exhibitions ==
=== Solo exhibitions ===
- Domestic Rituals: Photography by Mary Frey, Hudson River Museum, Yonkers, NY, 1984

=== Group exhibitions or exhibitions during festivals ===
- New Photography 2: Mary Frey, David Hanson, and Philip-Lorca diCorcia, Museum of Modern Art, New York, 1986/87
- Pleasures and Terrors of Domestic Comfort, Museum of Modern Art, New York, 1991. Curated by Peter Galassi.
- Pictures by Women: a History of Modern Photography, Museum of Modern Art, New York, 2010/11
- Domestic Rituals & Real Life Dramas, Copenhagen Photo Festival, Copenhagen, Denmark, 2019
