= Camille Solyagua =

American photographer

- Born: 1959 (age 66–67); Denver, Colorado
- Education: University of California, San Diego (BA); Middlebury College (MA); Academy of Art College
- Known for: Photograms
- Website: https://www.camillesolyagua.com/

Camille Solyagua (born 1959) is a Portland-based photographer known for her photograms of plants, insects and animals.

== Early life and education ==
Solyagua was born in Denver, Colorado. She received a Bachelor of Arts in Spanish Literature from University of California, San Diego in 1984, a Master of Arts in Spanish literature from Middlebury College in 1985, and studied at the Academy of Art College between 1989 and 1990.

== Style and critical reception ==
Many of Solygua's works are photograms – photographs made without a camera. Her photography focusses on the natural world, including plants, animals and insects. In a review of her 2007 exhibition at the Charles A. Hartman gallery, The Oregonian noted that each of her photos was made in a darkroom with no camera and unlike photographs that can be endlessly reproduced, each was "one-of-a-kind". The review also described her work as "spiritual but unromantic" and "[having] an unflinchingly scientific eye". A 1997 New York Times review of a group exhibition at the Candace Perich Gallery described her photographs as "emphasis on design and symmetry with an eye toward the fantastic".

== Career ==
Solyagua is based in Portland, Oregon.

=== Collections ===
Photographs by Solyagua are in the collections of the Museum of Fine Arts, Houston, the Santa Barbara Museum of Art, and the Los Angeles County Museum of Art.
