= Lynn Saville =

American photographer

- Born: 1950 (age 75–76); Durham, North Carolina
- Education: Duke University (BA); Pratt Institute(MFA)
- Known for: Night time urban photography of New York City
- Website: www.lynnsaville.com

Lynn Saville (born 1950) is an American photographer of night time urban landscapes.

== Early life and education ==
Saville was born in Durham, North Carolina.

She received a Bachelor of Arts degree from Duke University, and a Master's in Fine Art from Pratt Institute, New York.

== Life an work ==
Saville is primarily known for her night photographs of urban landscapes. Her subjects include streets and buildings in the New York area. She has described these nocturnal city scenes as: "an empty skeletal set where lights and shadows showcase an uninterrupted dance." Geoff Dyer described her work for The New Yorker magazine as "the archeology of overnight: resting tools, tired steps, dreaming brooms, sleeping shadows" through scenes that convey a sense of emptiness and vacancy.

She has taught at the International Center of Photography.

== Exhibitions ==
In 2015, Saville had a solo exhibition at the Pratt Institute gallery in Brooklyn, New York. In 2017, Saville had a one-person show at the Griffin Museum of Photography.

== Publications ==
- Horses in the Circus Ring. Dutton Books for Young Readers, 1989. ISBN 978-0525444176.
- The Language of Life. Bill Moyers, 1995.
- Acquainted with the Night. Rizzoli, 1997.
- Night/Shift: Color Photographs by Lynn Saville. Monacelli/Random House, 2009. ISBN 978-1580932196.
- Dark City: Urban America at Night, Photographs by Lynn Saville. Bologna: Damiani, 2015.
- New York, Photographs by Lynn Saville. Long Island City: Kris Graves, 2018.

== Collections ==
Her work is included in the permanent collections of the Mint Museum, the Museum of Fine Arts Houston, the Los Angeles County Museum of Art and the Brooklyn Museum of Art.

Her archives are held at the David M. Rubenstein Rare Book & Manuscript Library at Duke University.
