= Charlotte Rosshandler =

Canadian-American photographer

Charlotte Hooper Rosshandler (born 1943) is a Canadian-American photographer.

Her work is included in the collections of the National Gallery of Canada, and the Art Gallery of Guelph.
