= Angela Cappetta =

American photographer

Angela Cappetta is an American photographer.

== Early life ==
Cappetta has Italian heritage and had a multi-generational upbringing in New Haven, Connecticut.

== Photography ==
In the 1990s, she often got up early in the morning to walk the neighborhood of her home in the Alphabet City area of Manhattan and photograph with a 6x9 format camera. Her work includes diaristic self-portraits.

Cappetta's photographic series "Glendalis" revolves around a Puerto Rican girl named Glendalis, whose family shared multiple floors of a building on Stanton Street. The series follows Glendalis and her family for a decade, beginning in the 1990s when Glendalis was nine years old; it documents milestone events such as Glendalis's Sweet 16 and her cousin's quinceañera. Cappetta has acknowledged parallels between Glendalis's life and her own childhood. In 1999, some of her images were included in the group show Common Boundary at the Center for Photography at Woodstock curated by Sandra S. Phillips. The series was not designed to follow Glendalis from the outset, but that she became the nucleus of the photo series as time went on. Cappetta says the works are not a coming of age. She views them instead as a representation of family, community, and how relationships evolve over time.

Her project "We Are Gathered Here" is a documentary wedding photography series, bringing together over a decade of candid photographs made before smartphones changed the way we experience and photograph gatherings. Rather than focusing only on the ceremony itself, Cappetta turns her camera towards everything surrounding it, forming a vivid portrait of the wedding as a social gathering. Shot on film with Cappetta’s direct and unvarnished approach, the photographs capture a period when people would gather without the constant presence of screens and cameras. The result is both an intimate record of weddings and a wider reflection on community, connection and the ways we come together.

Cappetta received a fellowship from the New York Foundation for the Arts in 2000, and completed fellowships at the MacDowell Colony in 2000, 2004 and 2010. Prints from her Glendalis series are held in the collection of the Center for Photography at Woodstock, Kingston, New York, and the Victoria and Albert Museum, London (1 print). Her book Glendalis is held in the MoMA Library collection. She was shortlisted for the Rencontres d'Arles Photographie Prix du Livre in 2025 and is one of 45 photographers named as finalists in the Vogue Women by Women.

== Publications ==
- Glendalis: the Life and World of a Youngest Daughter. Bologna, Italy: L'Artiere, 2024. ISBN 979-12-80978-19-6. With essays by Luna Lauren Véléz and Cappetta. Edition of 750 copies.
- We Are Gathered Here. Bologna, Italy: L'Artiere, 2026. With essays by Dr. Shana Lopes Associate Curator of Photography at SFMOMA and Cappetta. Edition of 750 copies.
