= Layla Love =

American artist

- Born: 1979 (age 46–47); Los Angeles, California
- Education: University of California, Santa Cruz; Richmond, The American International University in London
- Known for: Photography
- Website: www.laylaloveart.com

Layla Love is an American photographer based in New York. Her works generally focus on disadvantaged, exploited, and trafficked people.

== Life, education and photographic work ==
Love was born in 1979 in Los Angeles, California. Growing up in California, Washington D.C., and Ireland, her childhood was characterized by continuous travel. By age 12, Love developed a fascination with photography.

Love studied at UC Santa Cruz and Richmond, The American International University in London.

At age 21, she ventured to war-torn areas with a focus on the plight of women and traveled to Chad, Cameroon, and Nigeria. Love's photography has been shown by Eric Franck Fine Arts at Paris Photo in Paris in 2011, and at the Association of International Photography Art Dealers (AiPAD) Photography Show in New York in 2009.

In 2014, after finishing 10 years of photojournalism work, Love moved to Kauai, Hawaii to focus on health and new projects. By 2014, over her career she published three books of images and writings on her photojournalism experiences.

In 2020, with the COVID-19 pandemic being underway, Love paired with fellow photographer Rachel Crane to undertake a project of photographing signs local populations on Kauai, Hawaii had put up to advocate for mental health support.

== Exhibitions ==
Love has exhibited photography domestically across the United States as well as internationally.

- 2007 - Representing Woman – Unbreakable Surrealism solo exhibition, World Culture Open Center, New York City
- 2009 - National Arts Club show curated by Catherine Johnson, London and New York City.
- 2009 - Paris Photo, Paris, France
- 2010 - Haiti Flag Day Fundraiser, White House, Washington D.C.
- 2011 - AiPad with Eric Franck Fine Art, New York City
- 2014 - Urban Indigenous Boutique and Gallery, Kilauea, Hawaii
- 2018 - Rise, Gallery Henoch, New York City
- 2020 - What Is Your Reality in the Pandemic Era?, Stoodio One, Brooklyn, New York
- 2021 - Art on Paper, Insight Artspace Art Fair, New York City
- 2023 - Champions, Art Exhibition at Gleason's Gym, New York City

Permanent Collections

- The Diamond Rooms of 30+ locations of Tiffany and Co. as of 2011
- Photograph "Love from the Roots" - White House permanent collection since 2008

== Books ==
- She of God (2019) Co-authored with Emily Anne Gendron, Cardiff-by-the-sea, CA: Waterside Productions.
- 300-page workbook authored by Emily Anne Gendron and Rise of the Butterfly.

== Philanthropy ==
Profits from her show Rise were promised to Voices for Freedom, Apne Aap, and CATW.

In 2016, Love, with Gloria Steinem, conceived of Rise of the Butterfly, to provide a sustainable source of funding for grassroots organizations working to fight human trafficking and help women and girls around the world recover from being trafficked.

Rise of the Butterfly aims to connect the Fine Art world with survivors of Human trafficking. Prior to founding Rise of the Butterfly, Love worked in conflict zones to help emancipate women from prostitution, slavery and other forms of human trafficking. Rise of the Butterfly seeks to raise awareness of human trafficking through public art initiatives, and gallery shows.

In 2022, Love acted as a co-founder for POSSIBLE Humanitarian Concerts. POSSIBLE seeks to merge entertainment and humanitarian causes by partnering with other NGOs such as Justice for Women, Chopra Foundation, Montessori Mission United Nations, Artic Arts Project, Blue Cooling Initiative, and Space Future Forum.
