= Yvonne Hemsey =

Photojournalist

- Born: November 12, 1948 (age 77); Puerto Rico
- Occupations: Photographer, photojournalist
- Years active: 1980–present
- Known for: Photojournalism of organized crime figures, breaking news, corporate portraiture

Yvonne Hemsey (born November 12, 1948) is an American photographer and photojournalist based in New York City. Over a career spanning more than four decades, she has photographed organized crime figures, breaking news events, politicians, celebrities, and corporate subjects. Her images have been published internationally and used in numerous documentaries and network news broadcasts. She is best known for her photographs of Mafia figures including John Gotti and Salvatore "Sammy the Bull" Gravano.

== Early life and education ==
Hemsey was born in Puerto Rico on November 12, 1948. She moved to New York City to study at the Mannes College of Music. She is married with two sons.

== Career ==
Hemsey is self-taught as a photographer. She began her career in 1980, freelancing for newspapers including the Daily News and the New York Post. This work led to representation by the international photo/press agency Gamma Liaison. When Gamma Liaison was acquired by Getty Images in 1999, Hemsey's work became represented by Getty. Her photographs have been published in TIME Magazine, Newsweek, Paris Match, Der Spiegel, Nouvel Economiste, The Wall Street Journal, and The New York Times.

=== Organized crime photography ===
On assignment for TIME Magazine, Hemsey covered the Mafia Commission Trial before the United States District Court for the Southern District of New York, which lasted from February 25, 1985, until November 19, 1986. On September 15, 1986, she photographed Carmine Persico, boss of the Colombo Crime Family, who agreed to pose exclusively for her while at the Metropolitan Correctional Center awaiting trial.

Hemsey photographed John Gotti, head of the Gambino Crime Family, on January 20, 1987. She also photographed Paul Castellano arriving for the "Commission Trial" on February 27, 1985.

On March 15, 1988, Vincent "Chin" Gigante, boss of the Genovese Crime Family, consented to being photographed while strolling down the street in Greenwich Village in his characteristic bathrobe attire. He was accompanied by his brother, Father Louis Gigante.

=== News and documentary photography ===
During the 1980s and into the 2000s, Hemsey covered major news stories including the insider trading scandal, the AIDS epidemic, drug epidemics, politics, and breaking news events. Her photographs of the 1982 Tylenol poisoning crisis have been widely reproduced in news coverage and historical accounts.

On October 14, 1986, Hemsey photographed Holocaust survivor and author Elie Wiesel at his home in New York City the day he was awarded the Nobel Peace Prize.

Hemsey photographed financier Ivan Boesky during the insider trading scandals of the 1980s.

She photographed convicted murderer Jean Harris hours before her conviction for killing cardiologist and "Scarsdale Diet" author Dr. Herman Tarnower. The photograph was published in Newsweek on March 20, 1981. She also photographed Joel Steinberg at Rikers Island on December 9, 1988.

In October 1986, she photographed a young man receiving AIDS prevention counseling.

=== Political photography ===
Hemsey photographed Rudy Giuliani numerous times during his tenure as U.S. Attorney for the Southern District of New York, when he indicted the heads of New York's five crime families. During Giuliani's campaign for mayor of New York City, one of Hemsey's portraits was used for publicity purposes.

Other political figures she photographed include Donald Trump, Jimmy and Rosalynn Carter, Geraldine Ferraro, Walter Mondale, Ed Koch, Mario Cuomo, Henry Kissinger, and Jesse Jackson.

=== Celebrity and corporate portraiture ===
As Hemsey's career progressed, she transitioned from street photography and breaking news to corporate portraiture. Subjects have included Ruth Madoff, Ted Turner, Lena Horne, Rupert Murdoch, Tom Brokaw, Imelda Marcos, B.F. Skinner, Dr. Ruth Westheimer, Peter Benchley, Malcolm Forbes, Catherine Deneuve, Andy Rooney, Vanessa Williams, Drew Barrymore, Steve Martin, Michael Jackson, Frank Sinatra, Luciano Pavarotti, Paul Newman, Joe Namath, Olga Korbut, Whitey Ford, and Wilt Chamberlain.

Hemsey photographed Michael Jackson and Brooke Shields for the cover of Paris Match on April 6, 1984.

Hemsey has also photographed medical procedures including in vitro fertilization and plastic surgeries such as breast augmentation, implant leakage repairs, and rhinoplasties.

=== Book covers ===
Hemsey's photographs have appeared on several book covers:

- His Eminence and Hizzoner: A Candid Exchange by NYC Mayor Ed Koch and Cardinal John O'Connor (William Morrow & Co, 1989)
- The First Billion is the Hardest: Reflections on a Life of Comebacks and America's Energy Future by T. Boone Pickens (Crown Currency, 2009)
- The World According to Breslin by Jimmy Breslin (Ticknor & Fields, 1984)
- Queen Bess – An Unauthorized Biography by Jennifer Preston (McGraw-Hill/Contemporary, 1990)
- Cosmetic Surgery by Marcia Amidon Lusted (ABDO Publishing Company, 2009)
- Life in Schools: An Introduction to Critical Pedagogy in the Foundations of Education (5th Edition) by Peter McLaren

== Controversies ==
On December 8, 1982, while covering the premiere of That Championship Season for TIME Magazine, actor Robert Mitchum threw a basketball at Hemsey's face, breaking her glasses and causing facial lacerations.

On July 11, 1986, Hemsey was involved in a confrontation with Bernhard Goetz, the "subway vigilante," and his girlfriend Lizabeth Theisen. Hemsey, on assignment for TIME Magazine, attempted to photograph Goetz near his apartment on 15th Street near Seventh Avenue. While Goetz had no objection, Theisen did, and a scuffle between the women ensued. Hemsey summoned police and filed a complaint alleging that Goetz had assaulted her. Goetz stated that his only involvement was attempting to pull the women apart. Theisen filed a counter-complaint of harassment. No summonses were issued.

== Archives ==
Hemsey's photographs are held in the Getty Images editorial archive and continue to be licensed for use in news articles, documentaries, and historical retrospectives.
