= Raissa Venables =

American photographer (born 1977)

Raïssa Venables
- Born: 1977 (age 48–49); New Paltz, New York
- Occupation: Artist

Raїssa Venables (born 1977) is an American photographer.

== Background and education ==
Venables was born in 1977 in New Paltz, New York. From 1993 to 1997, she attended the Arts Student’s League in Manhattan, concentrating on Anatomy for Life Drawing. In 1999 she received a BFA degree in photography and ceramic sculpture from the Kansas City Art Institute in Kansas City, Missouri. She earned a master's degree in photography at the Milton Avery Graduate School of Arts at Bard College in Annandale-on-Hudson, New York and a MFA degree in photography in 2002.

== Philosophy and style ==
Venables' photographs are about planar relationship, passage of time, motion, and perceptual fields, blurring the realm of the real world with the imagined one. She is influenced by Early Renaissance Flemish painters including Jan van Eyck, Rogier van der Weyden, and Robert Campin particularly with their usage of color and lighting. Venables' work is also influenced by the neo-cubistic approach to splitting and dissolving an object or space before reassembling them together. Curators make the comparison of Venables’ work with thematic perspective found in medieval art, in which objects are arranged in accordance to their spiritual values as opposed to their natural ones.

Matthias Harder, director of the Helmut Newton Foundation in Berlin, wrote about the artist’s reason for taking this approach, “Venables’ real intention is to open up unfamiliar perspectives and to transform real spaces into imaginary ones with realistic traits.”

== Publications ==
=== Solo exhibition catalogues ===
- Raïssa Venables. Ostfildern-Ruit, Germany: Hatje Cantz, 2006, edited by Kunstverein Ulm ISBN 978-3-7757-1763-2 with a foreword by Monika Machnicki, essays by Matthias Harder and Monika Machnicki and a transcript of an interview between Venables and Lori Waxman, touring exhibition catalogue
- Raïssa Venables, BAT CampusGalerie Exhibition. Bayreuth, Germany: CampusGalerie of British American Tobacco, 2010 OCLC 707159953 with an essay by Ulf Erdmann Ziegler, exhibition catalogue

=== Group exhibition catalogues ===
- Lange, Christiane, and Nils Ohlsen. Realismus: das Abenteuer der Wirklichkeit = Realism: the adventure of reality Munich: Hirmer, 2010. ISBN 978-3777424217 "Catalog of an exhibition held at the Kunsthalle Emden, January 23-May 24, 2010, and Kunsthalle der Hypo-Kulturstiftung, Munich, June 11-September 5, 2010"
- Real: Photographs from the Collection of the DZ Bank. Germany: Hatje Cantz, 2010, edited by Luminita Sabau ISBN 978-3-7757-2212-4 with contributions by Walter Grasskamp, Sabau, Martin Seel, et al.. German and English, exhibition catalogue

== Solo exhibitions ==
- [Unknown name of exhibition], Kunstverein Ulm, March–April 2006; Städtische Galerie Waldkraiburg February–March 2007; Kunstverein Ludwigshafen, May–July 2007; Kunstverein Grafschaft Bentheim, October–December 2007; Oldenburger Kunstverein, 2007/2008
- Raissa Venables: Intimacies, Jersey City Museum, New Jersey
- Raissa Venables, Klaudia Marr Gallery, Santa Fe, NM

== Collections ==
Venables' work is held in the following permanent public collections:

- Kunsthalle in Emden, Emden, Germany
- Nelson-Atkins Museum of Art, Kansas City, Missouri (Hall Family Foundation gift): 1 print, "Cupola" (2005)
- Anderson Museum of Contemporary Art, New Mexico: 1 print, "Yellow Steps" (2007)
