= Winifred Hall Allen =

American photographer

Winifred Hall Allen (born Winnifred Hall; March 21, 1911 – ) was a Jamaican-American photographer who documented the Great Depression and the Harlem Renaissance. Her work explored the role of African Americans within professional and social realms. Her identity as a female African-American artist facilitated her ability to photograph within various Harlem communities.

== Early life ==
Allen was born in Clarendon, Jamaica to Charles Hall and Rebecca Lumden. At the age of 18, Allen moved to New York City, where she attended the New York Institute of Photography. She completed an apprenticeship at the Woodward Studio in New York City and ultimately assumed ownership of the space when Woodward relocated to Chicago. She later renamed the studio "Winifred Hall Photo Studio". She was married to Fred Allen for many years and trained him to assist in her photography work before they separated. She became a U.S. citizen in 1946.

== Career ==
The initiation of Allen's photography career coincided with the establishment of the New Deal, and she became one of the leading photographic contributors for black newspapers and black-oriented foundations. Under the New Deal, Harlem could be photographed in a more realistic fashion, one that countered previous sensationalized representations. Like acclaimed contemporary James Van Der Zee, Allen's sought to "advance the race" through her work. Allen made a living from photography in the 1930s and 1940s working as a portrait photographer. Her documentation of birthday parties, weddings, club celebrations, as well as a variety of other social occasions brought further attention to the realities of Harlem society.

Allen chose not to exhibit any of her work in galleries or exhibitions. The only photographs that have been published are courtesy of Jeanne Moutoussamy-Ashe, who visited Allen at her studio to conduct an interview. Moutoussammy found three boxes of negatives in Allen's closet and persuaded Allen to donate some to her. The remaining body of Allen's work was destroyed by Allen herself, as she thought they held no value.

== Recognition ==
Most of the recognition that Allen has received has been by writers, who often discuss her work in relation to other female African-American photographers of the 1930s. However, her location within the Harlem community has also commonly invoked a connection between her work and that of James Van Der Zee.

== Publications ==
In 1986, Jeanne Moutoussamy-Ashe published 21 of Hall's photographs, which had never been published in any other source previously.
