= Mary Morgan Keipp =

American photographer (1875–1961)

Keipp's photograph of a man and a boy walking

Mary Morgan Keipp (October 25, 1875 – 1961) was a noted figure in the art photography movement of the early 20th century, exhibiting her photographs of rural Dallas County African-Americans in major exhibitions at the New York Camera Club (December 1899), the Annual Photographic Salon (November 1900), Dudley Galleries in London (October 1901), and the National Arts Club of New York Photo-Secession Exhibition (1902) organized by Alfred Stieglitz.

Born in Selma to a German immigrant father, Keipp began taking photographs as a hobby when she was 16. When she went to nursing school in the Northeast she began exhibiting the photographs she took during her summers at home in Alabama's Black Belt. After graduating, she returned to Selma in 1904 and began her career as a Nurse anesthetist at King Memorial and Selma Baptist Hospitals. With no outlet to exhibit her work locally, the photographs were kept among her private belongings and not seen again until they were donated after her death to the Selma Depot Museum by her nephew's family.

Keipp's photographs depict rural African Americans going about their normal routines in the Reconstruction South. Typical subjects include laundresses, nannies, field hands, and children at play. No evident moralism or artistic propositions color her work, which occupies a place between documentary realism and impressionism.
