= Nancy Borowick =

American artist, photographer and author

- Born: 1985 (age 40–41); Chappaqua, New York
- Education: International Center of Photography; Union College
- Website: http://www.nancyborowick.com/

Nancy Borowick (born 1985, Chappaqua, New York) is an American artist, photographer, and author. She studied photography at the International Center of Photography, and her work primarily documents family structures and personal histories to dissect how humans interact with, grieve, and memorialize loved ones. Her book The Family Imprint (2017) uses documentary photography and ephemera to tell the story of her parents who were both diagnosed with stage-four cancer and died within a year of each other. Her work has been shown in numerous solo and group exhibitions in the United States and abroad.

== The Family Imprint ==
Borowick's project The Family Imprint began as a project at the International Center of Photography as she documented her mother who was diagnosed with stage-four cancer. The photographs mostly depict her parents in various stages of diagnosis, delight, joy, sadness, Borowick's own wedding, and her parents' funerals. Borowick found difficulty in getting publishers interested in printing the book—many of which found the topic and the work too dark or solemn. In an attempt to both prove an audience existed for the project, Borowick launched a Kickstarter campaign that raised $65,313 to cover fees for printing, distribution, and a publishing agent. The book was published in 2017.

== Awards ==
=== 2018 ===
- Humanitarian Award by the Women That Soar organization
- German Photo Book Award for The Family Imprint, Bronze Prize

=== 2017 ===
- PDN Photo Annual Book Prize, The Family Imprint (Hatje Cantz, 2017, dist. by DAP)
- International Photo Awards, 1st prize in Documentary Books & 2nd prize in People
- NPR Favorite Visual Stories of 2017
- Wall Street Journal Book Shelf 2017 for The Family Imprint
- Photo-Eye Best Books of 2017 for The Family Imprint
- Women Photograph, Best Books of 2017 for The Family Imprint

=== 2016 ===
- World Press Photo, 2nd prize, Long Term Projects category, Amsterdam Finalist, World Report Award, Milan, Italy

=== 2015 ===
- National Geographic + Visura contest, USA
- Arnold Newman Prize for New Directions in Photographic Portraiture

=== 2014 ===
- Eddie Adams Workshop Award- Innovation in Visual Storytelling, USA
- Emerging Photographer Magazine, USA
- New York Photo Festival, Photo World, USA
- Lens Culture Top 5 Emerging Talent, exhibition in Spain, Japan & UK
- Best of ASMP 2014 featured photographer, USA
