= Susan Wides =

American photographer

Susan Wides (born 1955) is an American photographer.

Her work is included in the collections of the Brooklyn Museum, the International Center of Photography, the Princeton University Art Museum, the Samuel Dorsky Museum of Art, and the Museum of Fine Arts Houston.
