= Lynne Bentley-Kemp =

American photographer

Dr. Lynne Austin Bentley-Kemp (born 1952) is an American fine-art photographer, photography educator, and researcher.

== Career ==
Before becoming a professor of photography at Florida Keys Community College (now the College of the Florida Keys), she was an associate professor at the Rochester Institute of Technology. She earned a Ph.D. from Florida Atlantic University in 2003.

Bentley-Kemp has researched the practice of collecting photographs. Her work includes a series of 34 black-and-white infrared photographs titled Windows to the Sun. She was married to the educator Weston D. Kemp until his death in 2019.

== See also ==
- List of women photographers
