= Lissa Wales =

American photographer (1957–2005)

- Born: Elizabeth Marie Wales; 1957
- Died: 2005 (aged 47–48)
- Education: Arizona State University

Elizabeth Marie "Lissa" Wales (1957–2005) was an American photographer known for her photographs of drummers. Lissa Wales was known for her photographs of drummers that she documented in twenty years. The photographs were published in magazines in the United States, Europe and Asia.

== Biography ==
Wales grew up in Valley and studied at the Arizona State University (ASU) with a BA degree in Communications.

Wales developed acute myelogenous Leukemia in 2004. At a large benefit concert, held on 10 September 2005, she was honored at the Celebrity Theatre in Phoenix, The event was organized by Troy Luccketta (of the band Tesla), with the following drummers playing together: Denny Seiwell (Paul McCartney), Chad Smith (Red Hot Chili Peppers), Danny Seraphine (first drummer of Chicago), Billy Ashbaugh (NSYNC), Carmine Appice (Vanilla Fudge / Rod Stewart ), Jimmy DeGrasso (ex - Megadeth), Ken Mary (House of Lords) and Dom Famularo (World Educator).

As a tribute to Wales, the 2009 book by Jules Follet Sticks 'n' Skins featured photos and biographies of over 500 drummers.
