= Gulnara Samoilova =

American photographer (born 1964)

- Гульнара Самойлова
- Born: 1964 (age 61–62); Ufa, Russian SFSR, Soviet Union

Gulnara Samoilova (born 1964) is a Russian-born American photographer, living in New York City. Her work in New York City after the September 11 attacks won a World Press Photo award and is held in the collection of the Museum of Fine Arts, Houston. Samoilova is the founder of the website, social media platform and travelling exhibition Women Street Photographers, and edited a book of the same name.

== Life and work ==
Samoilova was born and grew up in Ufa, Bashkortostan, then part of the Soviet Union. After school she worked in a photo lab, then became a portrait photographer, and later a photojournalist for a local newspaper. She gained a diploma in photography from Moscow Polytech College.

In 1992 Samoilova moved to New York City and studied at the International Center of Photography. She worked for the Associated Press and photographed the aftermath of the September 11 attacks in New York City in 2001.

In 2017 Samoilova launched the website, social media platform and travelling exhibition Women Street Photographers, to show street photography by women. In 2021 a book of the same name was published, which she edited, containing the work of 100 photographers.

== Publications ==
- Women Street Photographers. Munich; London; New York: Prestel, 2021. Edited by Samoilova. ISBN 978-3-7913-8740-6. With a foreword by Ami Vitale and an essay by Melissa Breyer.

== Awards ==
- 2002: First Prize: People in the News, Singles category, World Press Photo, Amsterdam for a photograph in New York City after the September 11 attacks

== Collections ==
Samoilova's work is held in the following public collection:

- Museum of Fine Arts, Houston: 4 prints from New York City after the September 11 attacks (as of August 2021)
