= Nora Herting =

American artist

- Education: University of New Mexico (BFA); Ohio State University (MFA)
- Known for: Photography, Graphic recording, Graphic facilitation
- Notable work: "Face of Brooklyn" "Vertical Landscapes"

Nora Herting is an American artist, known for her photography work on graphic recording and graphic facilitation. She worked on Face of Brooklyn, a series of portraits of Brooklyn residents, sponsored by the Brooklyn Historical Society. She is the co-founder and CEO of ImageThink.

== Early life and education ==
Herting graduated from University of New Mexico with a Bachelor of Fine Arts in 1999. She worked at the Archdiocese of Chicago from 2000 to 2003. She received her Master of Fine Arts at Ohio State University in 2005. In both schools, her focus was in photography. While in Ohio, she worked on a project called Free Sitting, where she got a job as a trade photographer at Lifetouch in JCPenney, documenting her processes and feelings about doing portrait photography.

== Career ==
From 2006 to 2011, Herting worked as a design thinking strategist and graphic facilitator while working for Capgemini Consulting.

In 2007, Herting received a grant from the Getty Foundation and the Brooklyn Historical Society, where she created Face of Brooklyn, a collection of 281 portraits of Brooklyn residents taken at 8 parks across the borough. In 2011, she contributed to the Brooklyn Public Library's exhibition Attitude: Brooklyn Portraits by Brooklyn Photographers.

In 2007, she and artist Rachel Beach created Flip, an exhibition that includes Beach's wooden wall sculptures and Herting's Spirit photographs of cheerleaders.

Herting and fellow artist Heather Willems co-founded ImageThink in 2009 after seeing the limits of using traditional Powerpoint in meetings and the potential for graphic recording and graphic facilitation to help shape business strategy instead.

In 2013, Herting became a resident at Les Halles Le Havre, France through the Triangle Arts association. The resulting photographic work, Vertical Landscapes, was exhibited in Talle Humane at the Museum of modern art André Malraux - MuMa.

In 2016, she and Willems authored the book Draw Your Big Idea, published by Chronicle Books. The book is "a series of visual exercises for introspection, reflection, brainstorming and goal setting through drawing".

In 2018, Herting created portraits of Falun, Sweden residents for Faces of Falun, a reinterpretation of her earlier work based in Brooklyn. The series exhibited at Dalarna Museum in conjunction with the Gallerie Se Konst's art festival Sammankomsten.

== Publications ==
- Herting, Nora; Willems, Heather (2016). Draw Your Big Idea: The Ultimate Creativity Tool for Turning Thoughts Into Action and Dreams Into Reality. Chronicle Books. ISBN 978-1452152929.

== Personal life ==
Herting lives in Brooklyn, New York.
