= Joan Redmond =

American photographer

Joan Redmond (born 1946) is an American photographer.

Her work is included in the collection of the National Gallery of Canada, the Museum of Contemporary Photography, the Norton Simon Museum and in the Art Institute of Chicago.
