= Zoe Lowenthal Brown =

American photographer (1927–2022)

- Zoe Lowenthal Brown in 2010
- Born: Zoe Iris Norwood; April 11, 1927; Minnesota, U.S.
- Died: June 13, 2022 (aged 95); San Francisco, California, U.S.
- Known for: Photography

Zoe Lowenthal Brown (April 11, 1927 – June 13, 2022) was an American photographer, painter, technical writer and editor. Her work as a photographer has been affiliated with Minor White.

== Education and early life ==
Brown attended the San Francisco Art Institute (formerly the California School of Fine Arts) from 1951 through 1953. Founded by Ansel Adams, the institute is known for having the first fine-art photography program in the country. Minor White served as the director of the school at the time of Brown's attendance. Brown studied with Minor White who had asked her to study with him after seeing her photographs. She attended the California School of Fine Arts from 1951 through 1953.

Brown became dedicated to the medium of photography, and raised money for a down payment for her first quality camera (a Ciroflex) by selling a pint of her blood.

After graduation, Brown worked for a time as an assistant to the photographer Dorothea Lange. She transcribed Dorothea Lange: Field Notes and Photographs, 1935–1940 for the Oakland Museum. She also worked as an assistant to Wayne Miller.

== Work ==
Over the years, Brown's work spanned a broad range of styles and subjects, from documentary photographic "visual essays," through portraiture, and to deep explorations of light and form.

In 1952, she made a series of children on Halloween, for which she became known and was invited to publicly exhibit her work. This work was compared to Ralph Eugene Meatyard's photographs. She also photographed San Francisco's Asian New Year festivals, and this series of images were published in Aperture magazine in 1953.

Also in 1953, a series of her black and white photographs, shot with a Contax camera, was exhibited in Berkeley when she was still a student at the California School of Fine Arts. Brown was a member of The Photographers Gallery in San Francisco. In 1954-55 her work was included in the Perceptions exhibition at the San Francisco Museum of Art. Other artists in the show included Dorthea Lange, Minor White, and Edward Weston. In 1954 her work was included in The New Realism exhibition. Brown's work in the show focused on children "in the act of being themselves...in inner-city dwellings" and celebrations in the San Francisco Bay Area.

Brown's work has been written about in the 1953 book, 35MM Photography by Jacob Deschin, and in the 2004 book, Ten Photographers, 1946-54 - The Legacy of Minor White : California School of Fine Arts, the Exhibition Perceptions.

In 1954, she received an award from the Art Commission of the city and county of San Francisco for distinguished work in Photography.

In the 1960s, several of Brown's subjects were the Beat Generation artists and writers. At that time, Minor White spoke of Brown's work as "an example of the perceptive eye unearthing and recording a psychological truth, or a truth of a state of mind."

Brown has written that her "eye was caught by the puzzling, the ambiguous, by odd juxtapositions" for her photographic subjects. She often worked with a hand-held camera rather than using a tripod, and mainly worked with natural available light.

=== Reviews ===
- Aperture magazine Volume 2, No. 1, 1953, pp. 15, 18, 19, 26
- Dody Warren, Perceptions, (review), Aperture, Vol 2, No. 4, p. 23
- U.S. Camera, August 1954, p. 57
- Modern Photography, April 1955, p. 18

== Collections ==
Brown's photographic work is included in the collections of the Museum of Fine Arts, Houston, the San Francisco Museum of Modern Art, the Oakland Museum of California and the Minneapolis Institute of Art.
