= Ami Vitale =

U.S. photojournalist and documentary filmmaker

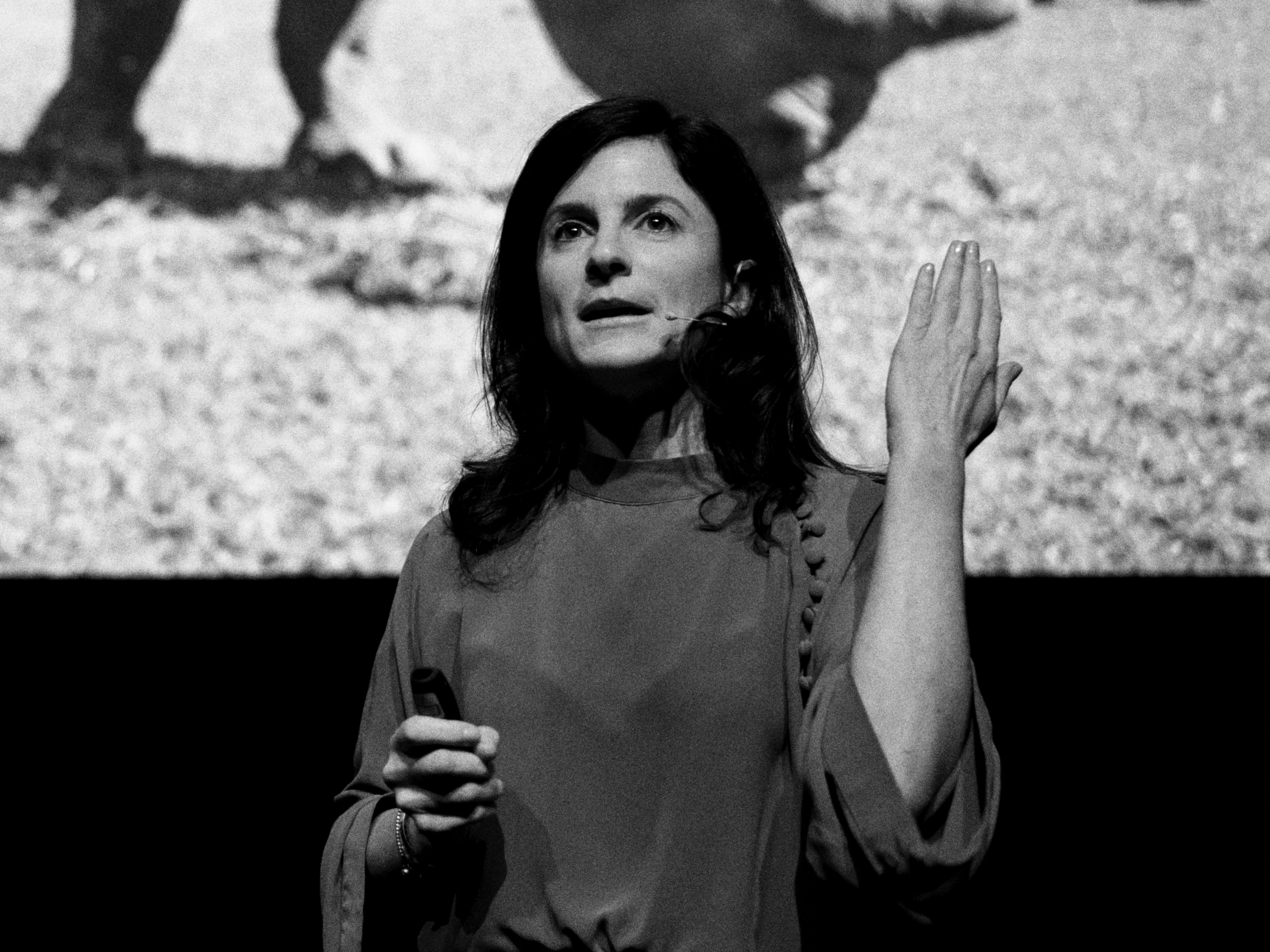
- Vitale at the 2018 World Press Photo festival
- Born: Florida, United States
- Occupations: Photojournalist; Documentary filmmaker

Ami Vitale is a U.S. photojournalist, documentary filmmaker, educator, and speaker. In 2018, she published a photo book titled Panda Love which captures pandas within captivity and being released into the wild.

== Early life and education ==
Vitale was born in Florida. She realized the potential of photography at a young age.

She has a degree in International Studies from the University of North Carolina.

== Photography and filmmaking ==
In 1994, Vitale joined the Associated Press (AP) as a picture editor in New York and Washington, D.C. She self funded her travel through her work with AP and left for the Czech Republic in 1997.

She moved to Prague, Czechia, and spent a year covering the war in Kosovo, traveling back and forth to Prague, and spending a month at a time in the war zone. She later traveled to Angola, and then to the second Intifada in Gaza and Israel. In 2000, she received an Alexia Foundation grant to document a small village in the West African nation of Guinea Bissau.

Vitale currently photographs wildlife and environmental stories in order to educate about global conservation issues. She is a visual journalist working as a photographer for National Geographic, a documentary filmmaker, and a cinematographer. Her recent still photography focuses on wildlife conservation in Africa, the Middle East, and Asia. As an ambassador for Nikon and a contract photographer with National Geographic magazine, she has documented wildlife and poaching in Africa, covered human-wildlife conflict, and concentrated on efforts to save the northern white rhino and reintroduce pandas to the wild.

Vitale is a founding member of Ripple Effect Images, as well as a member of the Photojournalism Advisory Council for the Alexia Foundation.

== Writing ==
Vitale is an author, contributor and frequently writes corresponding articles with her photojournalistic works.

== Publications ==
=== Books by Vitale ===
- Panda Love: the Secret Lives of Pandas (2018) – author, photographer

=== Books with contributions of photography by Vitale ===
- Associated Press: Guide to Photojournalism (2000) by Brian Horton
- National Geographic: The Most Popular Instagram Photos (2016)
- Seeing it All: Women Photographers Expose our Planet. 2024

== Films ==
- Independent Lens (2010) – camera development
- PBS Frontline World (2007) – reporter
- Bangladesh: A Climate Trap (2019) – director, co-writer
- Shaba (2021) – director

== Awards ==
- 2003: General News, third prize stories, World Press Photo, Amsterdam
- 2005: People in the News, second prize stories, World Press Photo, Amsterdam
- 2015: Nature, second prize singles, World Press Photo, Amsterdam
- 2017: Nature, second prize stories, World Press Photo, Amsterdam
- 2017: Science & Natural History Picture Story, third place, Pictures of the Year International
- 2018: Nature, first prize stories, World Press Photo, Amsterdam
- 2020: Wildlife Photographer of the Year, nomination
- 2020: National Geographic Photo of the Decade
- 2024: Honorary Fellowship, The Royal Photographic Society
