= Darlyne Komukama =

Photographer and installation artist

- Born: 1984 (age 41–42); Kampala
- Other name: DJ Decay
- Education: Bachelor's in Organisational Studies, Makerere University
- Occupations: Photographer, multimedia artist, installation artist, cultural practitioner
- Known for: Feminism‑focused art, black identity work, installation projects
- Notable work: The Saloon; Our Things; Penthouse

Darlene Komukama (born in 1984) is a Ugandan self-taught photographer, multimedia artist, installation artist, and Cultural Practitioner whose work focuses on feminism and black identity.

== Early life and background ==
Komukama was born in 1984 in Kampala, Uganda. She is a self-taught artist whose work focuses on the lived experiences of African women. She owns a Bachelors in Organizational Studies from Makerere University in Uganda.

== Artistic career ==
Komukama practices photography, installation, and multimedia projects that explore cultural and social themes related to black women and feminism.

Her major projects include the following;

- The Saloon: She co-created this with other three Ugandan women to celebrate black hair culture and practices, framing hair as both art and lived knowledge.
- Our Things: A video archive installation she made with another Ugandan artist to collect and share stories rooted in Ugandan experiences.
- Penthouse: A 2018 installation built on a rooftop in Kampala that served as a safe space for women to express their rage and emotional power.

== Exhibition and recognition ==
Komukama's projects have been shown on cultural events and venues including: the Southbank Centre in London as part of the Africa Utopia festival; Constitution Hill in Johannesburg for the Being Her(e) Exhibition; the Chale Wore Festival in Accra; the Africa Bass cultural festival in Ouagadougou, Burkina Faso; and other multiple locations in Kampala, Uganda, like the LaBa! street art festival.

== Other creative works ==
Komukama engaged in sound and performance art under her nickname DJ Decay. She also participated in and curated cultural events, such as co-curating an arts and performance day with Alliance Française Kampala.

== See also ==
- Contemporary African art
- Women photographers
