= Caroline Haskins Gurrey =

American photographer

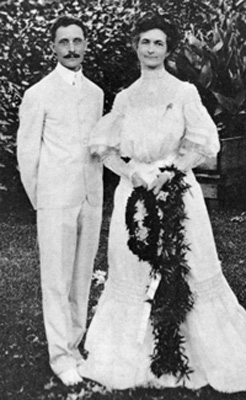
Caroline Gurrey and her husband Alfred Richard Gurrey, Jr., 1903

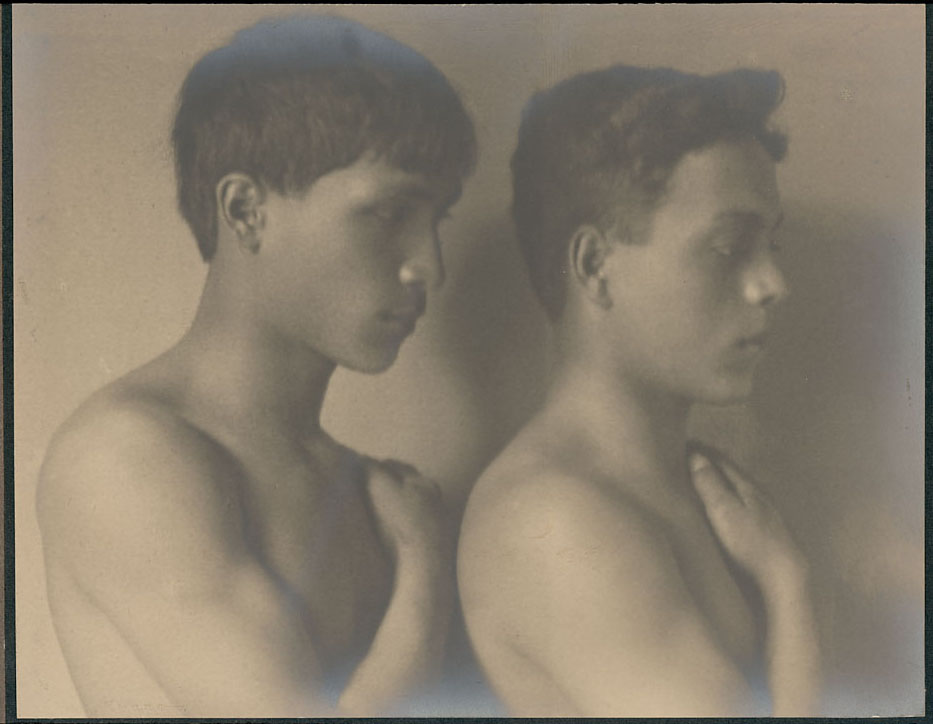
Caroline Gurrey: Portrait of Japanese-Hawaiian and Portuguese-Hawaiian boys (1909)

Caroline Gurrey (née Haskins, 1875–1927) was an American photographer who worked in Hawaii at the beginning of the 20th century. She is remembered for her series on mixed-race Hawaiian children.

== Biography ==
Born in Oakland, California, Caroline Gurrey ran a successful photographic studio in Honolulu where for many years she specialized in portraiture. In 1904, she married Alfred Richard Gurrey, Jr., an art dealer and amateur photographer remembered for his photographs of surfing. Caroline's most notable work is a set of photographs of Hawaii's mixed race children. In the summer of 1909, the photographs were exhibited at the Alaska–Yukon–Pacific Exposition in Seattle. Said to combine the Pictorialist style with ethnographic photography, they depict Hawaiian or mixed-race boys and girls. The 50 photographs displayed at the fair are now preserved in the Smithsonian's National Anthropological Archives.

Caroline Gurrey died in Hawaii in 1927.

== Literature ==
- Abramson, Joan (1976). Photographers of old Hawaii. Island Heritage.
