= Helen Johns Kirtland =

American photojournalist and war correspondent (1890–1979)

- Born: 1890
- Died: October 3, 1979 (aged 88–89)
- Occupations: Photojournalist, war correspondent

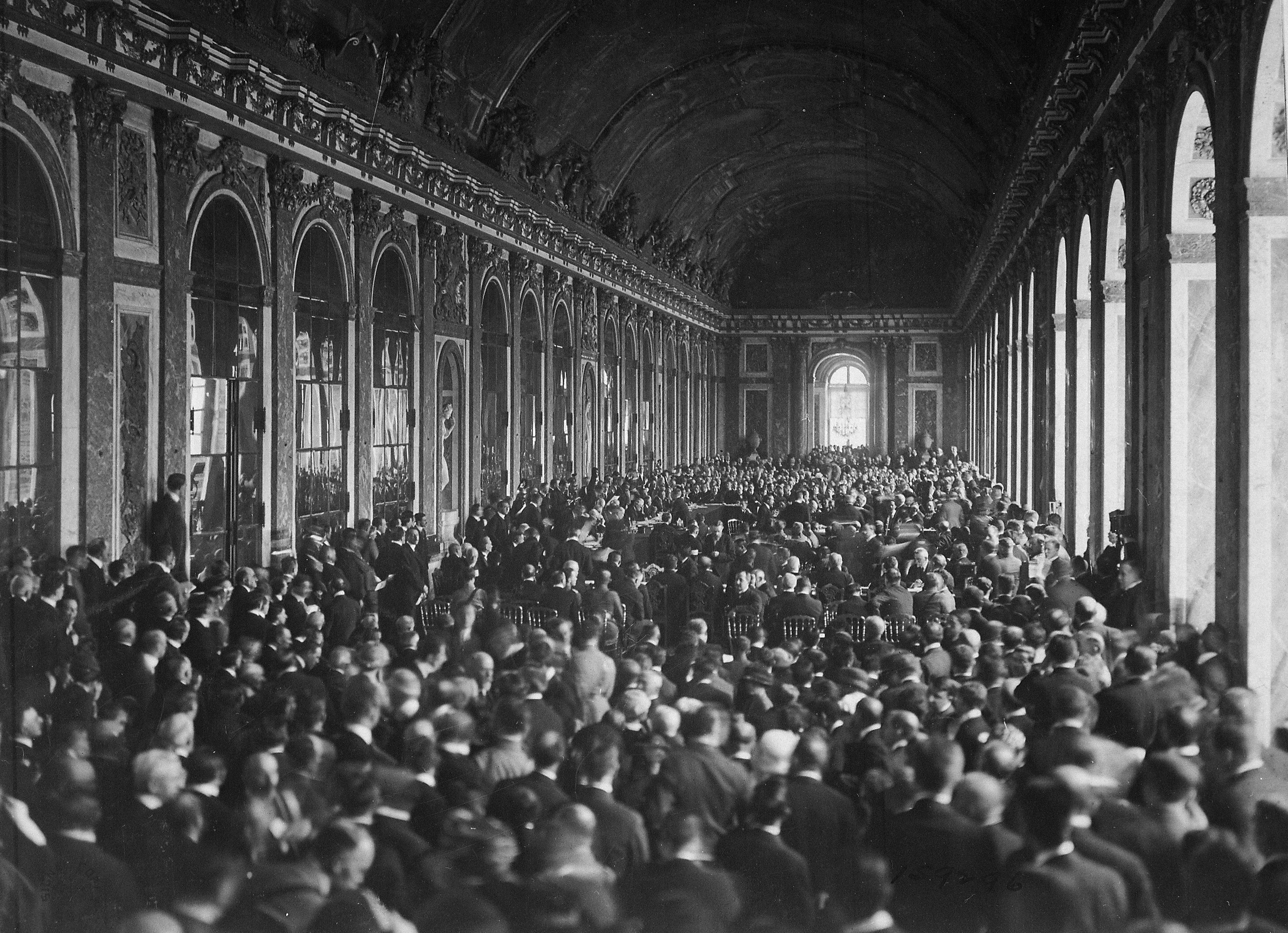
Kirtland's press photograph of the signing of the Treaty of Versailles

Helen Johns Kirtland (1890 – October 3, 1979) was an American photojournalist and war correspondent who competed with her male counterparts in her coverage of World War I.

== Early life ==
The daughter of Henry Ward Johns of the Johns Manville Corporation and his wife Emily Warner. After her father died in 1898, her mother moved to Lawrence Park, an artists' colony in Bronxville, New York. Kirtland grew up in Yonkers, New York. In 1904, she attended a girls' school in Germany. While young, she also visited Switzerland and France. In 1917, she married Lucian Swift Kirtland, of Poland, Ohio, a newspaper reporter.

== Career ==
During World War I, Kirtland was first based in France, working for the YMCA, before she joined her husband as a correspondent for Leslie's Illustrated Weekly. As an acknowledged journalist, she competed with her male counterparts, seeking out action. One of her stories covers battles near the Piave River in northern Italy with pictures of the Austrian trenches captured by the Italians.

In 1919, Leslie’s Photographic Review of the Great War included several pages of her war photographs. During the war, she had also written an illustrated article, "A Tribute to Women War Workers", explaining how women had helped the Allies. It included a rare portrait of Henriette Poincaré, the president's wife.

In the 1920s, Kirtland and her husband worked together, covering stories in Europe and Asia. Lucian contributed to journals including Harper’s Monthly, American Legion Weekly, and the New York Herald Tribune, his stories illustrated with photographs taken by Helen but seldom attributed to her.

Following her husband's death in 1965, Helen Kirtland died at their home in Bronxville on October 3, 1979.
