= Anna Benjamin =

American photojournalist (1874–1902)

Anna Northend Benjamin (1874–1902) was an American photojournalist, the first female photojournalist to report on a war. She covered both the Spanish-American War and the Philippine Insurrection.

== Life ==
Benjamin was born in Salem, Massachusetts on October 6, 1874. She reported on the Spanish-American War for Leslie's Weekly, despite the fact that the US government banned women journalists from the war zone. She reported on the Philippine insurrection for the New York Tribune and San Francisco Chronicle. She also wrote for magazines like The Outlook, Munsey's Magazine and Ainslee's Magazine.

Benjamin died of a tumor on January 2, 1902, while visiting her sister in France.
