= List of women photographers =

Women have made significant contributions to photography since its inception. Notable participants include:

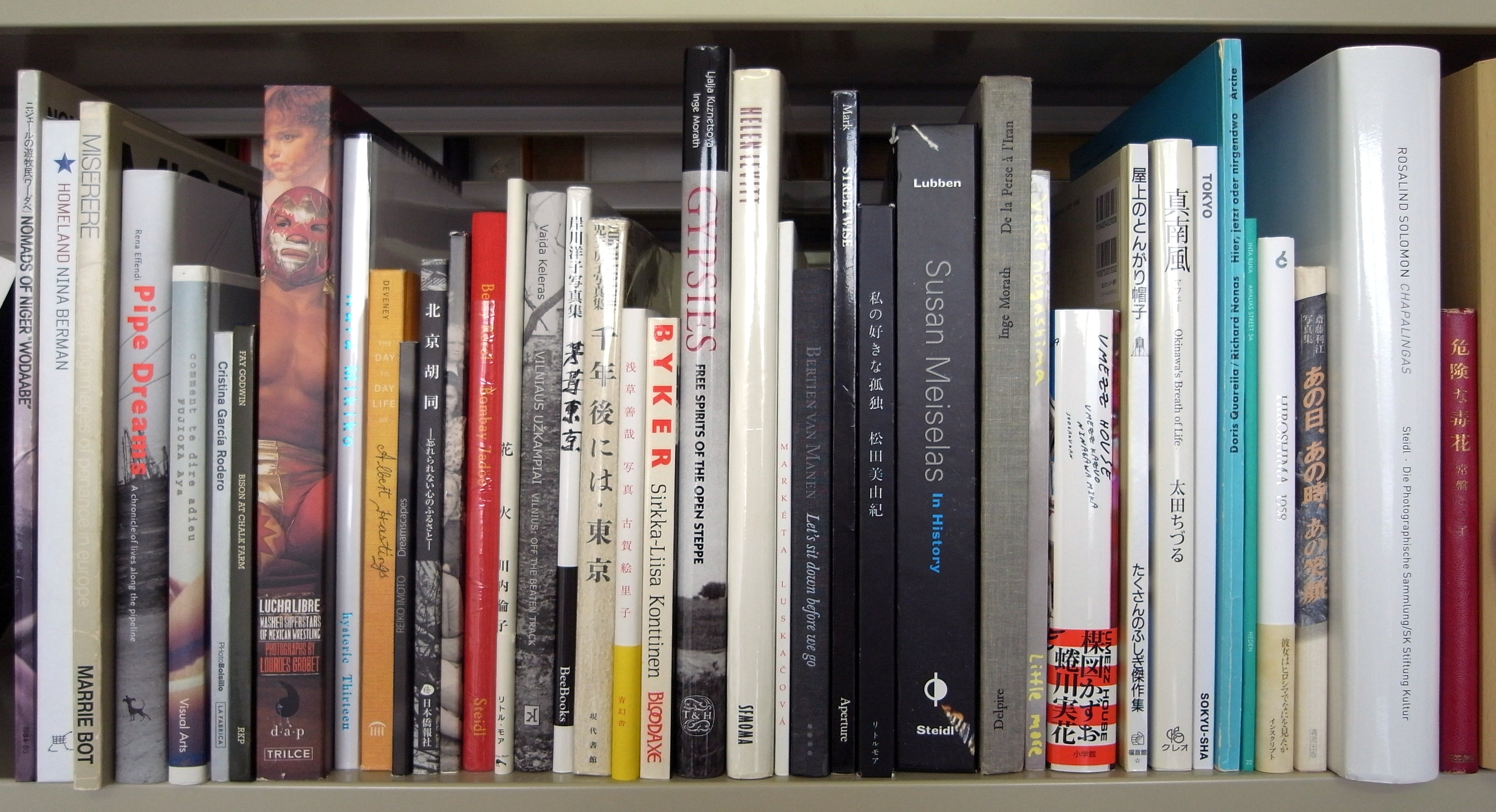
Photobooks by Carol Beckwith, Nina Berman, Marrie Bot, KayLynn Deveney, Rena Effendi, Aya Fujioka (藤岡亜弥), Cristina García Rodero, Fay Godwin, Lourdes Grobet, Mikiko Hara, Reiko Imoto (井本礼子), Kyōko Ioka (井岡今日子), Olya Ivanova (Ольга Иванова), Betsy Karel, Rinko Kawauchi, Vaida Keleras, Yōko Kishikawa (岸川洋子), Fusako Kodama, Eriko Koga (古賀絵里子), Ljalja Kuznetsova (Ляля Кузнецова), Sirkka-Liisa Konttinen, Helen Levitt, Markéta Luskačová, Bertien van Manen, Mary Ellen Mark, Miyuki Matsuda, Susan Meiselas, Inge Morath, Yurie Nagashima, Mika Ninagawa, Kei Orihara, Chizuru Ōta (太田ちづる), Megumi Ōtsuka (大塚めぐみ), Doris Quarella, Emmanuelle Riva, Inta Ruka, Toshie Saitō (齋藤利江), Rosalind Solomon, Toyoko Tokiwa

== Afghanistan ==
- Farzana Wahidy (born 1984), documentary photographer concentrating on women's issues in Afghanistan

== Algeria ==
- Zohra Bensemra (born 1968), photojournalist

== Azerbaijan ==
- Rena Effendi (born 1977), interested in the environment, post-conflict society, the effects of oil industry on people and social disparity

== Belarus ==
- Ottilia Reizman (1914–1986), documentary film and news photographer
- Tatsiana Tsyhanova (born 1978), portrait photographer

== Belgium ==
- Charlotte Abramow (born 1993), photographer and filmmaker
- Marleen Daniels (born 1958), photojournalist turned fashion photographer
- Jennifer Des (born 1975), photographer
- Bieke Depoorter (born 1986), Magnum photographer, several photo books
- Martine Franck (1938–2012), documentary photographer and portrait photographer
- Cindy Frey (active since 2003), musical bands photographer
- Nathalie Gassel (born 1964), writer, photographer
- Aglaia Konrad (born 1960), photographer, educator
- Diana Lui (born 1968), Malaysian-Belgian artist, photographer
- Régine Mahaux (born 1967), celebrity photographer
- Germaine Van Parys (1893–1983), pioneering photojournalist who joined Le Soir in 1922
- Marie-Françoise Plissart (born 1954), architecture photographer, videoartist
- Agnès Varda (1928–2019), film director, photographer, educator
- Eva Vermandel (born 1974), has photographed in Iceland and Ireland
- Katrien Vermeire (born 1979), photographer, filmmaker
- Stéphanie Windisch-Graetz (1939–2019), artistic portrait and animal photographer

== Brazil ==
- Claudia Andujar (born 1931), Swiss-born Brazilian photographer and photojournalist
- Brígida Baltar (born 1959), visual artist and photographer
- Alice Brill (1920–2013), German-born Brazilian photographer and painter
- Angélica Dass (born 1979), photographer and lecturer
- Luiza Prado (born 1988), artist, photographer
- Rosângela Rennó (born 1962), artistic photographer
- Hildegard Rosenthal (1913–1990), German photographer noted for her work after emigration to Brazil
- Juliana Stein (born 1970), visual artist and photographer
- Cybèle Varela (born 1943), mixed-media artist
- Alice Dellal (born 1987), model, photographer

== Cameroon ==
- Ginette Daleu (1977–2018), artist and photographer
- Angèle Etoundi Essamba (born 1962), humanist photographer of Africa

== Croatia ==
- Marija Braut (1929–2015), artistic photographer
- Sanja Iveković (born 1949), photographer, sculptor and installation artist, creating photographic works early in her career, earning her the Camera Austria Award
- Ivana Tomljenović-Meller (1906–1988), photographer, poster designer, and teacher who attended the Bauhaus

== Cuba ==
- Marta María Pérez Bravo (born 1959), black-and-white photography expressing mythological beliefs
- Lissette Solorzano (born 1969), medical photographer, photojournalist, widely exhibited

== Czechoslovakia, Czech Republic ==
- Bohumila Bloudilová (1876–1946), portrait photographer
- Irena Blühová (1904–1991), documentary photographer, student of the Bauhaus and Bratislava School of Fine Arts
- Veronika Bromová (born 1966), specialist in new media applications
- Anna Fárová (1928–2010), photography historian
- Eva Fuka (1927–2015), see United States
- Jitka Hanzlová (born 1958), portrait photographer
- Libuše Jarcovjáková (born 1952), diaristic photographer
- Běla Kolářová (1923–2010), Avant-garde photographer
- Markéta Luskačová (born 1944), social photographer, often covering children, also London's markets
- Emila Medková (1928–1985), influenced by surrealism
- Lucia Moholy (1894–1989), born in Prague, produced many of the photographs associated with the Bauhaus school, later working as a stage photographer in Berlin
- Marie Šechtlová (1928–2008), the poetry of the everyday
- Marie Tomanová (born 1984), portrait photographer, born in Valtice, since 2016 living in New York City

== Democratic Republic of Congo ==
- Gosette Lubondo (born 1993), photographer
- Pamela Tulizo (born 1994), photographer

== Estonia ==
- Ina Bandy (1903–1973), Tallinn-born humanist photographer, later based in Paris
- Birgit Püve (born 1978), freelance photographer and photo editor
- Katrina Tang (born 1985), fashion and portrait photographer
- Ann Tenno (born 1952), landscape photographer and photo artist, noted for her photographs of Tallinn and the churches and manor houses of Estonia

== Ethiopia ==
- Sheba Chhachhi (born 1958), photographer, filmmaker, artist
- Eyerusalem Jiregna (born 1993), photographer and photojournalist
- Aïda Muluneh (born 1974), photographer, photojournalist and contemporary artist

== Finland ==
- Eija-Liisa Ahtila (born 1959), conceptual photographer and video artist
- Caroline Becker (1826–1881), the first professional female photographer in Finland
- Signe Brander (1869–1942), cityscapes of Helsinki
- Adele Enersen (fl 2010s), writer, photographer, blogger
- Elina Brotherus (born 1972), photographer, video artist
- Nanna Hänninen (born 1973), chaotic objects, urban landscapes, and plants with repainting
- Marja Helander (born 1965), Sámi photographer, artist and filmmaker
- Marjaana Kella (born 1961), portrait photographer and academic
- Sirkka-Liisa Konttinen (born 1948), has photographed the Newcastle district of Byker and created a Coal Coast series on the beach between Seaham and Hartlepool
- Meeri Koutaniemi (born 1987), photographer and journalist
- Tuija Lindström (1950–2017), photographer, artist and academic
- Susanna Majuri (1978–2020), captures short narrative scenes as if film stills
- Laura Malmivaara (born 1973), actress, photographer and television host
- Heli Rekula (born 1963), photographer and video maker
- Victoria Schultz (fl 1970s), photographer and documentary film producer
- Seita Vuorela (1971–2015), novelist and photographer
- Saana Wang (born 1979), fine art photographer
- Julia Widgrén (1842–1917), early female professional photographer

== Gambia ==
- Khadija Saye (1992–2017)

== Ghana ==
- Felicia Abban (1935–2024), Ghana's first female professional photographer
- Josephine Kuuire artist, photographer, and activist

== Greece ==
- Ianna Andreadis (born 1960), combines photography with her interest in archaeology, also landscapes from southern Africa
- Venia Bechrakis (fl 2000s), artist and fine art photographer
- Mary Kay (fl 2000s), landscape photographer
- Nelly's (1899–1998), noted for her Greek temples, Berlin Olympics, later advertising, photo-reportages in the United States
- Voula Papaioannou (1898–1990), photographer of Greek people and landscapes
- Mary Paraskeva (1882–1951), possibly the first Greek woman to have left a large photographic legacy from the beginning of the 20th century
- Athena Tacha (born 1936), conceptual photographer

== Guatemala ==
- María Cristina Orive (1931–2017), photographer, reporter and photojournalist, co-founder of the La Azotea publishing the work of Latin American photographers

== Hong Kong ==
- Nancy Sheung (1914–1979)
- Tang Ying Chi (born 1956), artist, curator, photographer
- Wong Wo Bik (graduated 1977), architectural photographer

== Hungary ==
- Vivienne Balla (born 1986), fashion and fine art
- Ghitta Carell (1899–1972), Hungarian-born Italian portrait photographer
- Kati Horna (1912–2000), Hungarian-born Mexican photojournalist
- Judith Karasz (1912–1977), Bauhaus graduate
- Ergy Landau (1896–1967), Hungarian-born photographer, worked in Vienna, Berlin and latterly in Paris
- Mari Mahr (born 1941), Hungarian-British photographer
- Olga Máté (1878–1961), early portrait photographer
- Ylla (born Camilla Koffler) (1911–1955), first to specialize in animal portraiture

== Iceland ==
- Hansína Regína Björnsdóttir (1884–1972)
- María Guðmundsdóttir (born 1942), filmmaker, photographer and actress
- Nicoline Weywadt (1848–1921), pioneering female photographer
- Rebekka Guðleifsdóttir (born 1978), whose work posted to Flickr led to employment in advertising campaigns

== India ==
- Sonal Ambani (fl 2000s), writer, artist and photographer
- Rita Banerji (fl 2000s), writer, photographer and gender activist
- Dimpy Bhalotia (born 1987), street photographer
- Pamella Bordes (born 1961), worked as an international photojournalist for Gamma Press Photos, exhibitions include notable images from India and Cambodia, also self-portraits
- Sue Darlow (1960–2011), photographer in the UK and India
- Serin George (fl 2000s), fashion photographer and model
- Gauri Gill (born 1970), contemporary photographer
- Li Gotami Govinda (1906–1988), painter, photographer, writer and composer
- Indrani (born mid-1980s, Kolkata), full name Indrani Pal-Chaudhuri, India's best known fashion photographer, based in New York, known for her celebrity portraits such as David Bowie, Iman, Beyoncé, Kate Winslet, Will Smith, Lady Gaga, Kim Kardashian, Kanye West, also known as a Tribeca Film Festival Award-winning film director
- Saadiya Kochar (born 1979), first worked with the human body, portraits and then documentary (Kashmir)
- Richa Maheshwari (born 1988), fashion and lifestyle photographer based in New Delhi
- Pushpamala N. (born 1956), photographer and visual artist
- Latika Nath (fl 2000s), writer, photographer and wildlife conservationist
- Rathika Ramasamy, India's first woman wildlife photographer, particularly of birds
- Ketaki Sheth (born 1957), photographer and writer
- Dayanita Singh (born 1961), first photojournalism, later portraits and documentary work including Goa
- Shobha Deepak Singh (born 1943), photographer, writer and dancer
- Sooni Taraporevala (born 1957), screenwriter also working in photography, especially of India's Parsi Zoroastrian community
- Hema Upadhyay (1972–2015), photographer and installation artist
- Ajita Suchitra Veera (fl 2000s), film director, writer and photographer
- Homai Vyarawalla (1913–2012), India's first woman photojournalist, covered celebrities including Gandhi, Nehru, Jinnah and Indira Gandhi
- Annapurna Dutta (1894–1976), one of India's earliest professional female photographers; her photos featured Sarojini Naidu and others

== Iran ==
- Sahar Ajdamsani (born 1996), singer, writer, photographer
- Fatemeh Behboudi (born 1985), photojournalist and documentary photographer
- Parisa Damandan (born 1967), has collected portrait photographs illustrating the history of Isfahan, continuing her work after the 2003 Bam earthquake
- Solmaz Daryani (born 1989), photographer and photojournalist
- Zahra Amir Ebrahimi (born 1981), photographer, television actress and short movies director
- Shadi Ghadirian (born 1974), portraits of women dressed in traditional style, often juxtaposed with modern anomalies such as a mountain bike or cola can, now increasingly exhibited in the west
- Hengameh Golestan (born 1952), pioneering woman photographer
- Sooreh Hera (born 1973), artist and photographer
- Zahra Kazemi (1948–2003), Iranian-Canadian freeland photojournalist who died following arrest in Iran after covering poverty, destitutions and oppression in the Middle East
- Sanaz Mazinani (born 1978), Iranian-Canadian photographer and curator, installation based photography
- Shirin Neshat (born 1957), photos of women confronted by Islamic fundamentalism, later working with multimedia and film
- Ashraf os-Saltaneh (1863–1914), first woman photographer of Iran
- Shirana Shahbazi (born 1974), conceptual photography, installations
- Newsha Tavakolian (born 1981), Iranian documentary photographer
- Maryam Zandi (born 1947), founding board member of Iran's National Society of Photographers, has published many calendars of Iranian portraits

== Iraq ==
- Halla Ayla (born 1957), photographer, painter

== Ireland ==
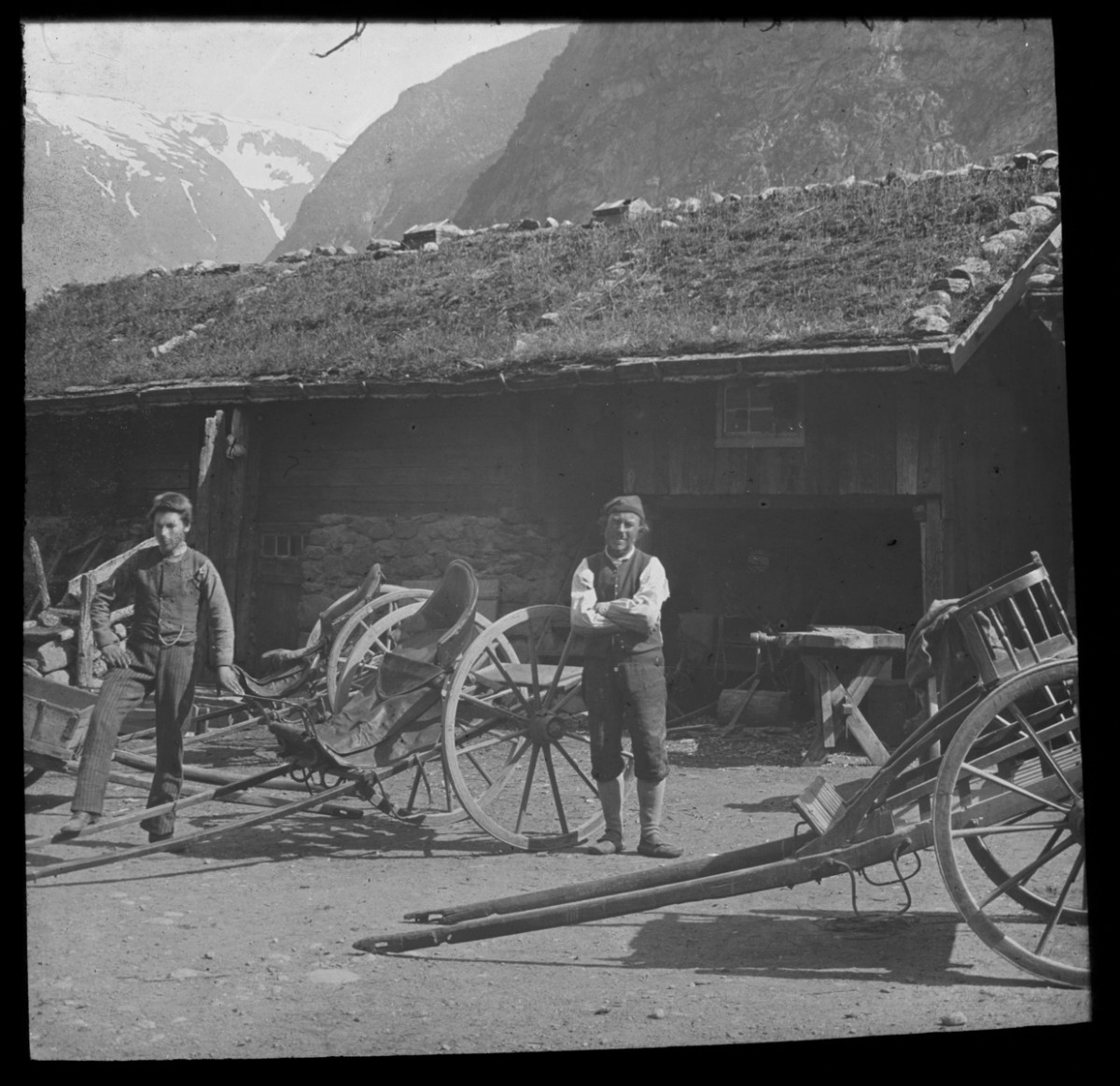
Photograph by Jane Shackleton

- Rhiannon Adam (born 1985)
- Elizabeth Hawkins-Whitshed (1860–1934), mountaineer, writer and photographer
- Joan Kennelly (died 2007), photographer and photojournalist
- Jane Shackleton (1843–1909), pioneering Irish photographer
- Helen Sloan (active since 1994), still and film photographer, known for photographing the TV series Game of Thrones

== Israel ==
- Lili Almog (born 1961), photographer and mixed media artist
- Dalia Amotz (1938–1994), photographer, works exhibited in Jerusalem's Israel Museum
- Sheffy Bleier (born 1964), photographer and educator
- Elinor Carucci (born 1971), see United States
- Michal Chelbin (born 1974), former military photographer, several publications
- Yishay Garbasz (born 1970), large format photographer and interdisciplinary artist
- Liselotte Grschebina (1908–1994), German-born, emigrated to Palestine, roots in New Vision
- Lea Golda Holterman (born 1976), commercial and artistic photographer
- Naomi Leshem (born 1963), fine art photographer
- Sagit Zluf Namir (born 1978)
- Angelika Sher (born 1969), Lithuanian-born Israeli photographer
- Tal Shochat (born 1974), fine arts photographer

== Italy ==
- Letizia Battaglia (1935–2022), photojournalist in Sicily, specializing in coverage of the Mafia for the newspaper L'Ora
- Vanessa Beecroft (born 1969), photographer and performance artist, now in Los Angeles
- Monica Bonvicini (born 1965), sculptor, photographer, video artist, educator
- Ghitta Carell (1899–1972), Hungarian-born, naturalized Italian photographer fluent from 1930 to 1950
- Elisabetta Catalano (1944–2015), fine arts photographer
- Marcella Campagnano (born 1941)
- Marina Cicogna (1934–2023), film producer and photographer
- Francesca Dani (born 1979), travel photographer
- Yvonne De Rosa (born 1975), art photography
- Inge Feltrinelli (1930–2018), German-born Italian photographer and publisher
- Domiziana Giordano (born 1959), painter, actress, photographer and video artist
- Maria Eisner (1909–1991), Italian-American photographer, photo editor and photo agent
- Luisa Lambri (born 1969), working mainly on architecture and abstraction
- Otonella Mocellin (born 1966), photographer and video artist
- Tina Modotti (1896–1942), born in Italy, worked as a fine art photographer and documentarian, with Edward Weston, ran a studio in Mexico City
- Valentina Murabito (born 1981), photographer and visual artist
- Dianora Niccolini (born 1936), pioneer of male nude photography
- Virginia Oldoini (1837–1899), early proponent, aesthetically interested in images of herself, large collection in Metropolitan Museum of Art
- Priscilla Rattazzi (born 1956), Italian-American magazine photographer
- Chiara Samugheo (1935–2022), photographer, photojournalist
- Floria Sigismondi (born 1965), fashion, installations, video
- Francesca Todde (born 1981), photographer and publisher
- Grazia Toderi (born 1963), video artist and photographer
- Marion Wulz (1905–1993), experimental fine art photographer
- Wanda Wulz (1903–1984), experimental fine art photographer

== Jamaica ==
- Esther Anderson (born 1946), portraits and documentary work
- Maria LaYacona (1926–2019)
- Donnette Zacca (born 1957)

== Kenya ==
- Mimi Cherono Ng'ok

== Latvia ==
- Inta Ruka (born 1958), specializing in portraits of people in the areas where they live

== Lithuania ==
- Esther Shalev-Gerz (born 1957), installation artist who also exhibits her photography
- Audronė Vaupšienė (born 1965), fashion photographer and collaborator in artworks

== Luxembourg ==
- Deborah De Robertis (born 1984), performance artist and photographer
- Marianne Majerus (born 1956), specializes in garden photography contributing widely to magazines and newspapers
- Su-Mei Tse (born 1973), musician, artist and photographer

== Mali ==
- Fatoumata Diabaté (born 1980)

== Malta ==
- Adelaide Conroy (born 1839), early photographer in Valletta

== Morocco ==
- Aassmaa Akhannouch (born 1973)
- Leila Alaoui (1982–2016)
- Lalla Essaydi (born 1956)
- Leila Ghandi (born 1980)

== Namibia ==
- Margaret Courtney-Clarke (born 1949), documentary photographer and photojournalist

== Pakistan ==
- Bani Abidi (born 1971), fine art photographer and video artist
- Saadia Sehar Haidari (born 1971), photojournalist
- Sadia Khatri (fl 2010s), photographer and feminist activist
- Farah Mahbub (born 1965), fine art photographer
- Farrukh Saleem (born 1988), Karachi based Female photographer known for her portraits and wedding photography

== Palestine ==
- Karimeh Abbud (1896–1955), professional photographer in Nazareth in the 1930s, also producing postcards
- Sama Raena Alshaibi (born 1973), Iraq-born Palestinian–US conceptual artist, using photography, also an academic
- Rula Halawani (born 1964), photographer, photojournalist, educator
- Emily Jacir (born 1972), artist in photography and other media, also an academic
- Ahlam Shibli (born 1970), photographer of Bedouins of Palestinian descent

== Peru ==
- Andrea Hamilton (born 1968), fine art photographer
- Milagros de la Torre (fl 1990s), fine art photographer
- Daphne Zileri (1936–2011), Argentine-born Peruvian photographer and photobook author

== Poland ==
- Jadwiga Golcz (1866–1936), Polish photographer, one of pioneering women of the medium in Poland
- Lotte Beese (1903–1988)
- Helga Kohl (born 1943), Polish photographer based in Namibia
- Margaret Michaelis-Sachs (1902–1985), Austrian-Australian photographer of Polish-Jewish origin, portraits, architecture of Barcelona, Jewish quarter in Cracow
- Nata Piaskowski (1912–2004), Polish-born American photographer, portraits and landscapes, based in San Francisco
- Zofia Rydet (1911–1997), documented postwar Poland
- Faye Schulman (1924–2015), took photos during World War II
- Ilona Szwarc (born 1984), photographer
- Joanna Zastróżna (born 1972), photographer and filmmaker

== Portugal ==
- Helena Almeida (1934–2018), conceptual painter and photographer
- Helena Corrêa de Barros (1910–2000), amateur photographer
- Ana Dias (born 1984), photographer of erotic femininity
- Mónica de Miranda (born 1976), photographer and visual artist
- Rita Carmo (born 1970), portrait photographer and concert photojournalist

== Romania ==
- Alexandra Croitoru (born 1975), seeks to challenge accepted ideas of power sharing and gender in Romania
- Marta Rădulescu (1912–1959), writer and photographer
- Thea Segall (1929–2009), Romanian photographer who was based in Venezuela

== Russia ==
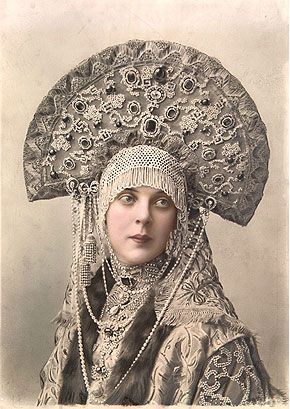
Princess Olga Orlova at the 1903 Ball, a hand-tinted image of Princess Olga Orlova by Elena Mrozovskaya, now in the collection of the Hermitage Museum

- Hélène Adant (1903–1985), Russian-born French photographer
- Evgenia Arbugaeva (born 1985), photographer of the Russian Arctic
- Maria Bordy (born 1918), Russian-born press photographer active in the U.S.
- Anastasia Chernyavsky (fl 2010s), Russian-born photographer working in the U.S.
- Tatyana Danilyants (born 1971), film director, photographer and poet
- Lena Herzog (born 1970), see United States
- Masha Ivashintsova (1942–2000), photographer from St Petersburg
- Ida Kar (1908–1974), known for her portraits of artists and writers
- Anastasia Khoroshivlova (born 1978), artist and photographer
- Galina Kmit (1931–2019), artist, photographer and photojournalist
- Diana Markosian (born 1989), documentary photographer who has photographed the north Caucasus and central Asia
- Elena Mrozovskaya (before 1892 – 1941), early Russian professional photographer
- Irina Popova (born 1986), Russian / Dutch documentary photographer
- Galina Sanko (1904–1981), photojournalist and war photographer
- Yulia Spiridonova (born 1986), photographer and contemporary artist
- Danila Tkachenko (born 1989), visual artist and documentary photographer
- Sophia Tolstaya (1844–1919), diarist and photographer
- Natalia Turine (born 1964), German-born Russian photographer and journalist based in France

== Singapore ==
- Marjorie Doggett (1921–2010), animal rights advocate, architectural photographer, and heritage conservationist
- Sim Chi Yin (born 1978), photojournalist

== Slovenia ==
- Julie Martini (1871–1943), photographer
- Justina Hermina Pacek (1931–2016), nurse, photographer, painter, illustrator

== South Africa ==
- Jenna Bass (born 1986), film director, photographer and writer
- Jodi Bieber (born 1966), known for taking the photograph of Bibi Aisha, the Afghanistan woman whose nose and ears were mutilated by her husband and brother-in-law
- Hannelie Coetzee (fl 2000s), visual artist and professional photographer
- Mbali Dhlamini (born 1990), artist and photographer
- Tracy Edser (born 1982), photojournalist and documentary producer
- Vera Elkan (1908–2008), remembered for her images of the International Brigades in the Spanish Civil War
- Phumzile Khanyile (born 1991)
- Constance Stuart Larrabee (1914–2000), South African's first female World War II correspondent, also known for images of South Africa
- Carla Liesching (born 1985), visual artist specialising in photography
- Nandipha Mntambo (born 1982), visual artist and photographer
- Ruth Seopedi Motau (born 1968), professional photographer and photo editor
- Zanele Muholi (born 1972), has used photography in support of LGBTI issues, several solo and group exhibitions since 2004
- Neo Ntsoma (born 1972), known for being the first woman recipient of the Mohamed Amin Award, the CNN African Journalist of the Year Prize Photography
- Jo Ractliffe (born 1961), photographer and teacher
- Lesley Rochat (fl 2000s), conservationist and underwater photographer
- Colla Swart (born 1930), photographs of people, landscapes and flowers in Namaqualand
- Nontsikelelo Veleko (born 1977), depicts black identity
- Gisèle Wulfsohn (1957–2011), covered the struggle against apartheid and HIV/AIDS awareness initiatives

== South Korea ==
- Jun Ahn (fl 2000s), photographer known for her Self-Portrait series
- Bae Doona (born 1979), actress and photographer
- Ina Jang (born 1982), South Korean photographer based in the United States
- Miru Kim (born 1981), artist, photographer and arts events coordinator
- Jungjin Lee (born 1961), photographer and artist based in New York
- Nikki S. Lee (born 1970), self-portraits posing in various ethnic and social groups such as punks, hip-hop musicians, male partners
- Soi Park (fl 2010s), fine art photographer

== Switzerland ==
- Hélène Binet (born 1959), first photographed in the Grand Théâtre de Genève before turning to architectural photography, now based in London
- Mauren Brodbeck (born 1974), photography
- Martha Burkhardt (1874–1956), painter and photographer
- Claudia Christen (born 1973), multi-disciplinary designer and photographer
- Laurence Deonna (1937–2023), journalist, writer and photographer
- Alwina Gossauer (1841–1926), early professional photographer
- Henriette Grindat (1923–1986), artistic photographer in the post-war period inspired by the surrealistic trends of the times
- Beatrice Helg (born 1946), fine art photographer
- Olivia Heussler (born 1957), photographer documenting political and cultural events
- Monique Jacot (1934–2024), photojournalist
- Rosa Lachenmeier (born 1959), painter and photographer
- Catherine Leutenegger (born 1983), visual artist and photographer
- Ella Maillart (1903–1997), travel photography
- Franziska Möllinger (1817–1880), Switzerland's first female photographer
- Karin Muller (born 1965), author, filmmaker, photographer and adventurer
- Marie-Jeanne Musiol (born 1950), Canadian-Swiss photographer
- Marguerite Naville (1852–1930), painter, illustrator and photographer of Egyptian archaeological finds
- Leta Peer (1964–2012), painter and fine art photographer
- Julieta Schildknecht (born 1960), Swiss-Brazilian photographer and journalist
- Annemarie Schwarzenbach (1908–1942), prolific writer and photographer, leaving some 50 photo reports documenting the rise of the Nazis in Germany and her travels to the Middle East and the United States
- Eva Sulzer (1909–1990), photographer, musician, collector and filmmaker

== Taiwan ==
- Wang Hsin (born 1942), documentary and fine art photographer

== Turkey ==
- Eylül Aslan (fl 2000s), fine art photographer and feminist
- Sabiha Çimen (born 1986)
- Nilüfer Demir (born 1986), photojournalist and photographer
- Elvin Eksioglu (born 1966), film director photographer and screenwriter
- Semiha Es (1912–2012), Turkey's first female photojournalist, worked between 1950 and 1970s as a war photographer
- Yıldız Moran (1932–1995)
- Maryam Şahinyan (1911–1996), Turkey's first female photographer, managing a studio from 1937, archive of some 200,000 images
- Naciye Suman (1881–1973), Turkey's first Muslim female photographer, owning a studio from 1919 to 1930

== Ukraine ==
- Elena Filatova (born 1974), created a photographic hoax claiming she shot photographs of the Chernobyl area while on a solo motorcycle ride; many of the images were not even hers.

== Uzbekistan ==
- Umida Akhmedova (born 1955), photojournalist working in Central Asia, arrested in 2010 for her images of the Uzbek people

== Yemen ==
- Alaa Al-Eryani (born 1990), photographer, filmmaker, writer, and feminist activist

== Gallery ==
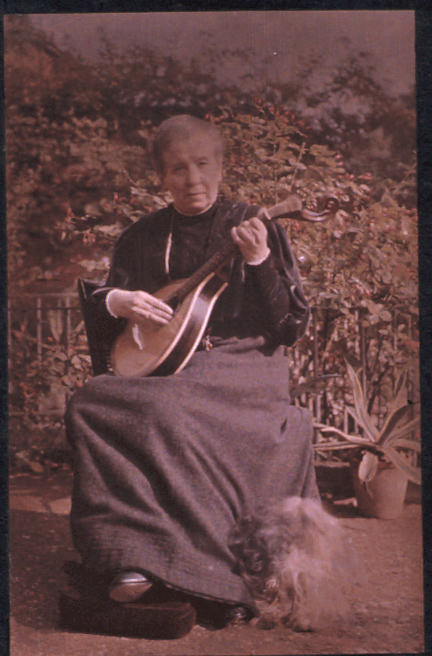
Sarah Angelina Acland

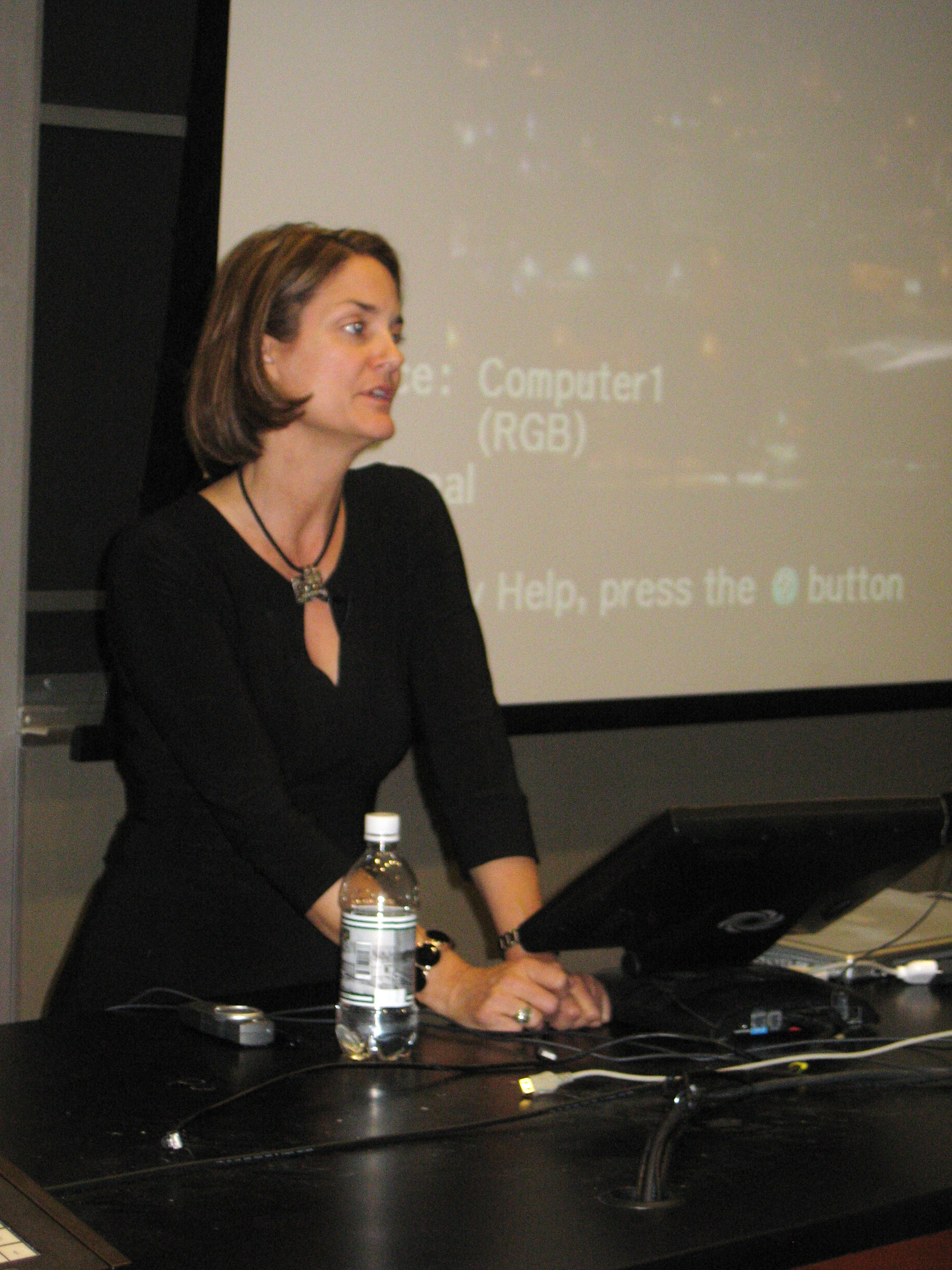
Carolyn Cole

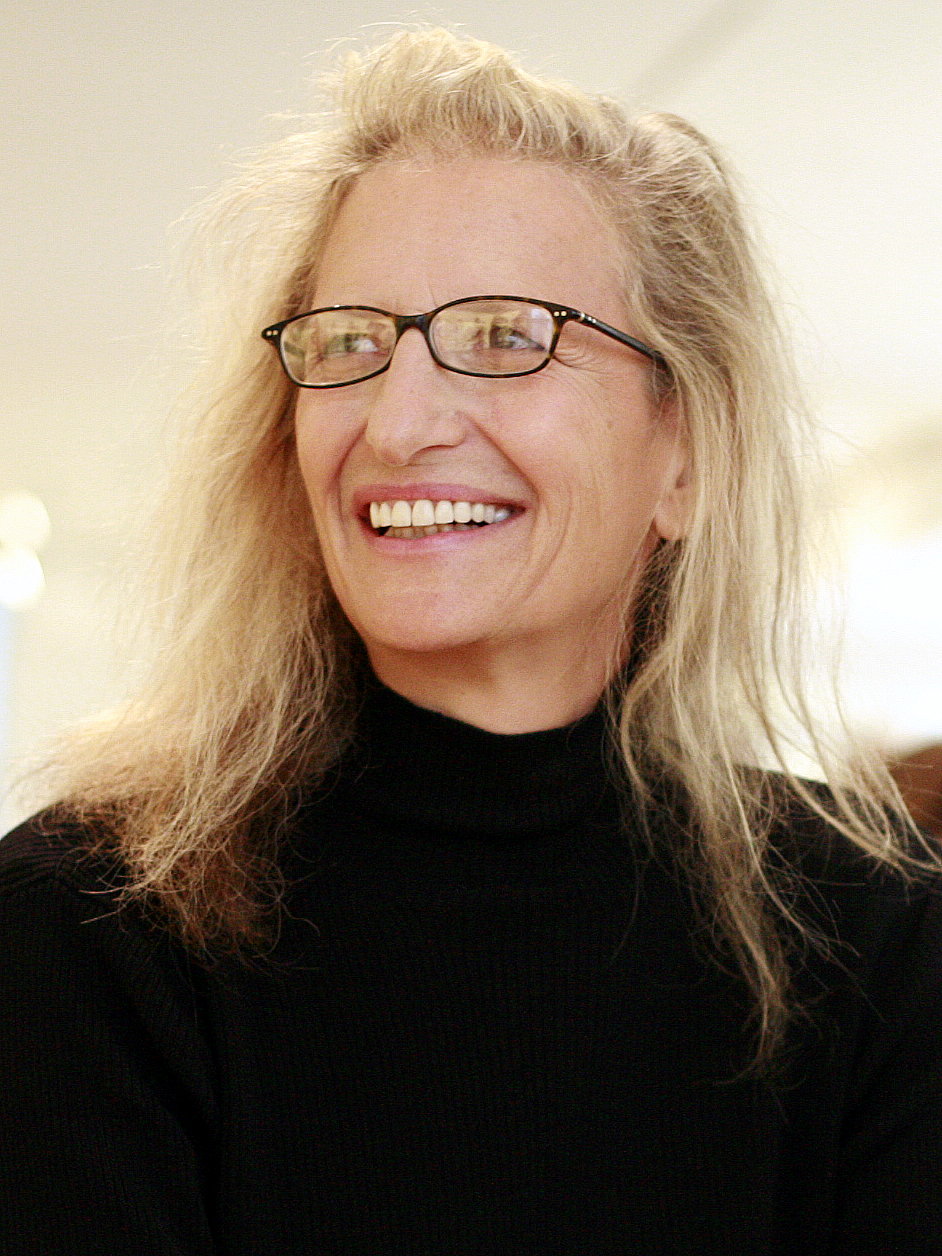
Annie Leibovitz

== See also ==
- Timeline of women in photography
- List of photographers
