= Pigorini =

Pigorini may refer to:

- Luigi Pigorini (1842–1925), Italian palaeoethnologist, archaeologist and ethnographer
- Palazzo Pigorini, palace in Parma
- Pigorini National Museum of Prehistory and Ethnography, museum in Rome
