= Elaine Stocki =

Photographer, painter and professor

- Born: 1979 (age 46–47); Winnipeg, Manitoba
- Occupations: Photographer, painter, professor

Elaine Stocki (born 1979) is a Canadian artist and professor known for her paintings, photographs and her abstract feminist art. Stocki lives in Los Angeles and teaches art at Fullerton University.

== Early life and education ==
Stocki was born in 1979 in Winnipeg, Manitoba. She studied at the University of Manitoba, where she received both a BSc (chemistry) and a BFA degree. She received a Master of Fine Arts from Yale University in 2009.

== Work ==
Although Stocki is known primarily for her photographs, her paintings have been exhibited in Paris, New York and Los Angeles.

Her photographs have been described as "little retro gems", that appeal to viewers' nostalgia, but can also have a raw, street photography quality. Stocki prints her images on silver gelatin, and tints them by hand. Her works' retro feel is produced by the processes by which she creates them, including film sprocket holes and layers cut and pasted by hand. The street photography quality of her work is often referenced to the "indecisive moment", a play of the term coined and made famous by photographer Henri Cartier-Bresson. Stocki has expressed disdain for the ironical photography of the 1990s often referred to as postmodern. "I think the deadpan look of photographers like Tina Barney doesn't reflect human experience. ... I take offense at work that is entirely divorced from human experience!"

Stocki was awarded the international Tierney Fellowship in Photography for emerging artists in 2009, the same year as South African photographer Tracy Edser.

Her work is in the permanent collections of the Philadelphia Museum of Art and the Los Angeles County Museum of Art.

== Selected works ==
| Year | Title | Publication |
|---|---|---|
| 2009 | Balcony Series & P.A Series | Night Papers |
| 2009 | Elaine Stocki: Balcony | TBW Books |
| 2011 | Time magazine's LightBox | Time |
| 2015 | Matte Magazine no. 40: Homeless | Matte Magazine |
| 2017 | Hoar Frost | Golden Spike Press |
| 2018 | LENS Catalogue | LACMA |

== Awards ==
| Year | Name | Won/Nominated |
|---|---|---|
| 2009 | Tierney Fellowship | Won |
| 2011 | Grange Prize | Finalist |
| 2012 | Sobey Art Award | Nominated |
| 2019 | Duke and Duchess of York Prize in Photography | Won |
