= Chiara Samugheo =

Italian photographer (1935–2022)

- Born: Chiara Paparella; 25 March 1925; Bari
- Died: January 13, 2022 (aged 96); Bari
- Known for: photojournalism, celebrity photographs

Chiara Samugheo, pseudonym of Chiara Paparella (25 March 1925–13 January 2022), was an Italian neorealist photographer and photojournalist.

== Early life ==
Samugheo was born in Bari, Italy in 1925, although throughout her life she gave 1935 as her year of birth. As a youngster she dreamed of composing music, and against the wishes of her parents, who would have her be a school teacher, Samugheo left for Milan in 1953. There she mixed with the intellectual and artistic environment of Enzo Biagi, Alberto Moravia, Pier Paolo Pasolini and Giorgio Strehler, who suggested she study acting and mime. As reported by in Il Fatto Quotidiano by Serena Viola "I escaped to Milan, where my life changed," meeting there her life partner Pasquale Prunas, founder of the magazine Sud for which Domenico Rea and Francesco Rosi wrote.

== Photojournalist ==
Needing a job, since her parents, in order to persuade her to return to Bari, had cut off her allowance, Samugheo accepted her first commission; to go to Predappio, the home of the Mussolini family. She then photographed women in Galatina, the invasate, possessed with Tarantism, who would travel to the Chapel of Saint Paul (Chiesa di San Paolo) to seek healing from a "spider bite" that caused hysteria, depression, or convulsions.

Inspired by Patellani's photojournalism, Chiara Samugheo's 1955 fotodocumentari, reportage on poverty Naples with text by Domenico Rea, brought her to attention. It was a confrontational and frank recording of starving populations, in an accusatory spirit about the shame of 'this Italy'. Most striking is a flash-lit portrait of a screaming mother which was dominant in the layout.

Her work was published in Cinema Nuovo, established by film critic Guido Aristarco in 1952 who supported neorealist cinema of Italy through his articles published in the magazine, and was arrested on 10 September 1953, and convicted of "press crimes" for publishing the story of "L'armata s'agapò" (the Army was Asleep). War, fascism, poverty and the resistance were now no longer permitted topics, and no longer tolerated by the Christian Democrat censors. Such was the climate in which Cinema Nuovo published important photodocumentaries, such as those by Samugheo and Franco Pinna, Carlo Cisventi, Benedetto Benedetti, Paolo Costa.

Samugheo continued to work, very successfully, for illustrated magazines like Tempo, Epoca and Paris Match. Carlotti writes of two "schools" of freelancers that emerged in the early 1950s and places Samugheo in Milan's alongside "Mario Dondero, Ugo Mulas, Alfa Castaldi, Carlo Bavagnoli...and Uliano Lucas" while the other group, in Rome, comprised:

Antonio and Nicola Sansone, Franco Pinna, Calogero Cascio, and Mario Carubba, to name just a few. These new photographers did not work on commission but rather submitted their work to newspapers themselves. They were familiar with, and inspired by, the work of great foreign photographers, and had magazines like Paris Match, Stern, and of course Look and Life in mind.

== Celebrity photographer ==
Later in the 1950s and into the 1960s Samugheo discontinued her reportage to photograph Italian film stars and celebrities for the cinema and fan press. Her camera of choice was a Hasselblad, with which she photographed, usually on location and increasingly in colour, great international stars including Liz Taylor, Shirley MacLaine, Monica Vitti, Sophia Loren, Claudia Cardinale and Gina Lollobrigida.

In the era of la dolce vita a new type of photojournalism and the magazines in which it appeared presented the star system as a sign of modernity, presenting the figure of the "diva", the woman of cinema, as an object of desire. Chiara Samugheo's photographs start from this context, but aim to give back to the divas' body-object a true femininity and personality, something intimate that enhanced the mythology of Italian cinema. Donata Gianeri writes of the tranfomation of actress and singer Milva:

It's as if she's lost a dimension, her face has paled and thinned, but she hasn't a shadow or a crease, almost as if all her romantic misadventures have barely touched her (perhaps the art of a true actress lies precisely in this: not allowing dramas to ruin her facade, which must be presented intact to photographers—in this story, to Chiara Samugheo's lens—and to the press); in return, she's acquired perfect self-confidence. She's arrived, and she knows it; she's a moneymaker, she knows it. Authors who present her with their best work, contracts that offer themselves. Pop-culture aggression is no longer of use to her; she can appear as sweet as a seasoned diva and, like a seasoned diva, keep the poison in her mouth.

In March 1974, when she was living on the historic and fashionable Via del Biscione, near Piazza Campo de' Fiori, Rome, it was reported that youths crashed her party attended by guests Ugo Tognazzi, Franca Bettoia, Vittorio Gassman, Paolo Villaggio, Sydne Rome, Marquis Renato Prunas, architect Andrea Sartogo, and others from Roman society. When the intruders were ejected, a scuffle ensued, police called, and valuable items were found to have been stolen.

After living in Rome, Samugheo moved to Nice where she exhibited, and worked in her studio on rue Droite where she befriended painter Daniel Schinasi whom she photographed in his studio on the Côte d'Azur. She donated approximately 165,000 of her photographs to Carlo Arturo Quintavalle, director of the Parma Museum of Photography. Made an honorary citizen in France, on 2 June 2003 Samugheo received the title of Cavaliere della Repubblica Italiana. She died in Bari on 13 January 2022, at the age of 96.

== Awards ==
Among 44 awards and prizes won by Samugheo are:

- Oscar dei due mondi de Spoleto
- Premio Minerva, La Venere d'argento
- Premio della Ferrania, Premio fotocine club di Mantova
- Premio stampa di Sanremo
- Premio Intemazionale della culture di Piazza Navona
- Premio concorso journalistico internazionale
- Premio Intemazionale della danza a Bento, Brasil,

== Exhibitions ==
- 1996, to 31 January: Chiara Samugheo: Al cinema con le stelle. Istituto Internazionale per l'Arte Contemporanea, Via Adda, Milan
- 1999, February: 39th Monte Carlo International Television Festival, Palazzo dei Congressi, Rome
- 2000, January: Palais de l'Europe, 8 Av. Boyer, Menton, France
- 2004, 8 March–9 May: Chiara Samugheo: Le Parmigiane. Palazzo Pigorini, strada Repubblica 29, Parma
- 2002, January: Ritratto d'una diva, Centro Universitario Mediterraneo, Promenade des Anglais, Noto, Sicily
- 2006, from 9 April: Vicini alle stelle, Sarti Shaw, Chiara Samugheo, Tazio Secchiaroli, curators Amiand Deriaz and Uliano Lucas. Mazzotta Foundation, Milan
- 2007, 30 June–14 October: Fellini privat: il maestro fotografato da Chiara Samugheo. Remini, Museo Fellini
- 2012, 7 June: Off the set. Chiara Samugheo’s photographs for cinema. Museo Nazionale del Cinema - Fondazione M. A. Prolo, Torino, Italia Collections
- Museum of Fine Arts Houston
- CSAC - Centro Studi e Archivio della Comunicazione (Abbazia di Valserena) of University of Parma.

== Publications ==
- Costumi di Sardegna (1982)
- Sardegna nel Sinis
- "Stelle di carta: fotografie di Chiara Samugheo (Library resource)". European Institute for Gender Equality.
- O dolce mio (1985)
- Lucca e la Lucchesia
- Vanità sarda
- Vicenza e Palladio
- Sardegna, quasi un continente
- I Nebrodi
- Bacco in Sardegna
- Natura magica della Sardegna
- Le corti del verde
- Il reale e l'effimero
- Cento dive
- Cento anni di cinema
- Carnaval de Rio
- Rond, Gian Luigi; Quintavalle, Arturo Carlo; Montaldo, Anna Maria (1995). Al cinema con le stelle: cento fotografie di Chiara Samugheo [At the cinema with the stars: a hundred photographs by Chiara Samugheo] (in Italian). Cagliari: Centro d'arte e cultura.
- Samugheo, Chiara (2004). Le parmigiane: fotografie di Chiara Samugheo [The parmesanes: photographs by Chiara Samugheo] (in Italian). Monte Università Parma.
- Samugheo, Chiara; Lucas, Uliano; Quintavalle, Arturo Carlo, eds. (2006). Vicina alle stelle - Chiara Samugheo. Milano: Mazzotta. ISBN 978-88-202-1796-9.
- Samugheo, Chiara; Vannucchi, Barbara; Grassi, Enzo; Ricci, Giuseppe; Fontemaggi, Alessandra; Rinaldini, Alessandra (2007). Fellini privat: il maestro fotografato da Chiara Samugheo [The Private Fellini: the master photographed by Chiara Samugheo] (in Italian). Rimini: Fondazione Federico Fellini.
- Samugheo, Chiara (2017). Ciriello, Daniela; Ciriello, Germana; Fabris, Piero; Longo, Renato (eds.). Chiara Samugheo: un'amazzone della fotografia [Chiara Samugheo: an amazon of photography]. Louvre (in Italian). Bari: Les Flâneurs edizioni. ISBN 978-88-99500-57-3.

== Bibliography ==
- Bini, Alfredo; Rondi, Gian Luigi; Quintavalle, Arturo Carlo; Morandini, Morando; Fava, Claudio G.; Cozzi, Carlo; Mori, Anna Maria (1995). "100 DIVE 100 anni di Cinema. Foto di Chiara Samugheo" [100 Divas. 100 years of cinema. The photography of Chiara Samugheo]. Bianca e Nero (in Italian) (Special edition): passim.
- Marro, Olivier (2007). Chiara Samugheo, Cinecittà for ever, nous nous sommes tant aimés: exposition, Mougins, Musée de la photographie André Villers, 12 avril-2 septembre 2007. Musée de la photographie André Villers. Mougins: Musée de la photographie André Villers Service des affaires culturelles de la Ville de Mougins. ISBN 978-2-9526404-4-2.
- Miglietti, Francesca Alfano; Casa dei Tre Oci (Venice, Italy); Marsilio editori, eds. (2015). Through women's eyes: from Diane Arbus to Letizia Battaglia: passion and courage (First ed.). Venezia: Marsilio; Tre Oci. ISBN 978-88-317-2281-0.*
