= Rita Carmo =

Portuguese photographer

- Born: 8 May 1970 (age 55); Leiria, Portugal
- Education: Fashion Design (IADE), Communication Design (University of Belas-Artes)
- Occupations: Photojournalist, instructor, graphic designer, music video director
- Years active: 1992—present
- Known for: Music photography
- Notable work: Altas Luzes (2003), Bandas Sonoras — 100 Retratos na Música Portuguesa (2013)
- Awards: Região de Leiria's Afonso Lopes Vieira Professional Merit Award, APORFEST Women in Music Industry Award
- Website: www.ritacarmo.com

Rita Carmo (born 8 May 1970) is a Portuguese portrait and concert photographer and photojournalist known for her work in the musical area. She is a resident photographer at Blitz Magazine since 1992, as well as a collaborator at various national publications such as Expresso and Forbes Portugal, and her photography work has been published in several international magazines around the world.

She has published two book albums of her photographic work, Altas-Luzes (2003) and Bandas Sonoras — 100 Retratos na Música Portuguesa (2013), as well as collaborating in other published books such as with Blitz magazine, Xutos e Pontapés, The Gift and Sérgio Godinho.

Adjacent to her photography work, she is also a graphic designer, photography instructor, music video director and regularly exhibits her work in both solo and collaborative exhibitions. Aside from her jury work in multiple editions of photography competitions, she was also one of the six juries in Festival da Canção 2021, the live broadcast national music festival for selecting the entry that represents Portugal in Eurovision Song Contest.

She received the Região de Leiria's Afonso Lopes Vieira Professional Merit Award in 2019, and in 2023, APORFEST awarded her the Women in Music Industry Award.

== Early life and education ==
Rita Carmo was born in 1970 in Leiria In 1995, she graduated in Communication Design in University of Belas-Artes in Lisbon, after previously completing IADE's course in Fashion Design with a specialization in Fashion Photography. As a finalist in the Fashion course at IADE, aspiring to become a fashion illustrator, a fashion producer who worked as a reporter in Blitz weekly newspaper noticed Rita Carmo's final project fashion photography exposition stand and asked Carmo to photograph her colleagues' fashion show for the newspaper, and, later, was invited to photograph a concert.

== Career ==
In February 1992, Carmo began her collaboration as a photographer at Blitz weekly newspaper, for which she was invited to join the editorial staff in September of the same year, and where she remained until April 2006, when the newspaper was restructured into a monthly magazine.

Carmo is currently resident photojournalist at Blitz Magazine and collaborator at Expresso, Forbes Portugal, and Career Choices, as well as a photography instructor in World Academy — Artistic School, CENJOR — Centro de Formação para Jornalistas (Training Center for Journalists) and Instituto Português de Fotografia (Portuguese Photography Institute), and previously on Restart. She has a design partnership "Espanta-Espíritos", with António Afonso, since 1995.

Internationally, her photography work has been widely published, such as in Japan (Rockin'On and Snoozer Mag), UK (Melody Maker), France (Le Figaro Magazine), Brazil (Revista Bizz), Spain (OK!) and the Netherlands (Story).

She was kissed by Bono Vox, lead vocalist of the band U2, in the Zooropa Tour concert in 1993, which was transmitted live.

=== Music videos ===
Carmo made her music video solo directing debut in 2017 with Celina da Piedade's "Linha e o Linho". In 2020, she directed Sara Vidal's "Baile da meia volta", and in 2021, the first and second single from Cat Music's album "Tatuagem Virtual", "Lado B" and "Planta na Terra", respectively.

=== Jury work ===
She was a jury in Portugal Festival Awards in 2013, 2014 and 2015.

For FNAC, she was a jury of the FNAC New Talents Photography Award in 2004 and 2005, as well as FNAC's Photography Marathons.

In Azores, she was jury of the LabJovem Award - Azores Young Creators Contest in the area of photography in 2012, 2014 and 2016.

She was a jury in Festival da Canção 2021, the live broadcast national music festival for selecting the entry that represents Portugal in Eurovision Song Contest, along with Paulo de Carvalho, Rita Guerra, NBC, Vanessa Augusto and Marta Carvalho.

=== Awards ===
In 2019, she receives the Região de Leiria's Afonso Lopes Vieira Professional Merit Award, dedicated to distinguished professionals in the area of journalism.

In 2023, she receives the APORFEST Women in Music Industry Award, awarded by public voting to acknowledge women with a relevant role in the Portuguese music industry over time.

=== Media appearances ===
Aside from multiple magazine and press interviews, Carmo has also appeared on several occasions on television, radio, and other media outlets. On television, she has been interviewed various times in each of the main Portuguese television broadcasting networks: RTP1, RTP2, SIC and TVI, such as on SIC Notícias' Jornal da Noite, RTP's 5 para a Meia-Noite and Bom dia, Portugal.

On radio, podcasts, and other media outlets, she has been interviewed on "TSF", "Femina", "Fala com Ela", "Primavera Sound", "Cabeças de Cartaz" and "Encontros Imediatos", among others.

== Publications ==
Carmo has published 2 photo albums as collections of her work focused on musician's portraits and live concert performances, as well as a special joint edition sold with Blitz magazine nº30 and nº31, "Portugal XXI — Imagens de Sons Portugueses" in November 2008.

- Altas-Luzes (2003). ISBN 978-972-37-0867-7
- Bandas Sonoras — 100 Retratos na Música Portuguesa (2013). ISBN 978-989-51-0839-8

=== Collaborations ===
- Xutos & Pontapés - XX Anos (1999). ISBN 9789728494025
- 15 Histórias de Hábitos - Criadores de Moda em Portugal (2003). ISBN 9789725891131
- Retrovisor: Uma biografia musical de Sérgio Godinho (2006). ISBN 978-972-37-1097-7
- The Gift 20 (2015).
- Mulheres na Ciência (2019). ISBN 978-972-98602-6-3
- Mulheres na Ciência (2021). ISBN 978-989-54649-5-1
- Kioskzine 4.0 - Rita Carmo (2022)
- 75 Canções - 2º edition (2023). ISBN 978-972-37-2293-2

== Exhibitions ==
Carmo has participated in various exhibitions of her photography work.

- Exhibitions associated with the publishing of Carmo's first book "Altas-Luzes" (2003) are set in various places:
  - Exhibition in Livraria Arquivo, in Leiria (May 2004)
  - Exhibition in Sociedade Harmonia Eborense, in Évora (May 2005)
  - Exhibition in 4ème Festival Portugais (4th Portuguese Festival) in Paris (June, 2005)
  - Exhibition in Azambuja, Festival do Tejo (July 2005)
  - Exhibition in Cybercento, in Castelo Branco (Abril 2006)
- Collective exhibition in shop windows as part of the event “Chiado has the Largest Photographic Exhibition in the World”, in 2010
- Exhibitions associated with the publishing of Carmo's second book “Bandas Sonoras” (2013) are set in various places across Portugal, starting in October 2011 with an exhibition of the same name as the book in Barreiro
  - Exhibition in Azores, Terceira Island (April 2013)
  - Exhibition in Theater José Lúcio da Silva, Leiria (November 2013)
  - Exhibition in Feira da Música de Beja in Beja's Casa da Cultura (September 2014)
  - Exhibition in Festival Maré de Agosto on the island of Santa Maria, Azores (August 2016)
  - Exhibition in Instituto Politécnico de Setúbal (October 2017)
  - Exhibition in Centro de Artes e Espectáculos da Figueira da Foz (Março 2018)
  - Exhibition in Festival MicroSons in Oeiras (Abril 2019)
  - Exhibition in Casa da Cultura, Setúbal (Março 2022)
- Solo exhibition "Sul e Sueste" for the month of photography in Barreiro's Municipal Auditorium Augusto Cabrita in 2014, featuring portraits of musicians taken on the region of Barreiro
- Curator for Super Bock Super Rock Festival 20 Year Exhibition on Pavilhão de Portugal, Parque das Nações in 2015
- Exhibition "12 Mulheres, 12 Vozes" (12 Women, 12 Voices) in Coimbra's downtown shop windows in 2019 as part of the festival "Abril no Feminino"
- Exhibition "VelvetNirvana" in 2020 in Pavilhão Branco in Lisbon's Museum
- Solo exhibition of the project "Exit - Saída de Emergência" on FNAC stores in 2022, documenting empty concert halls during the lockdown period of COVID19's pandemic
- Retrospective collective exhibition of Coldplay's performances in Portugal at Alma Shopping - Coimbra, where she was also curator, inaugurated on 1 of April, 2023
- Solo exhibition for Altice Arena Open Day celebrating its 25 years of activity, inaugurated in May 2023

== See also ==
- List of women photographers
