= Chiesa di San Paolo apostolo =

Church in San Marino

Coordinates: 43°55′31.8″N 12°29′58.6″E

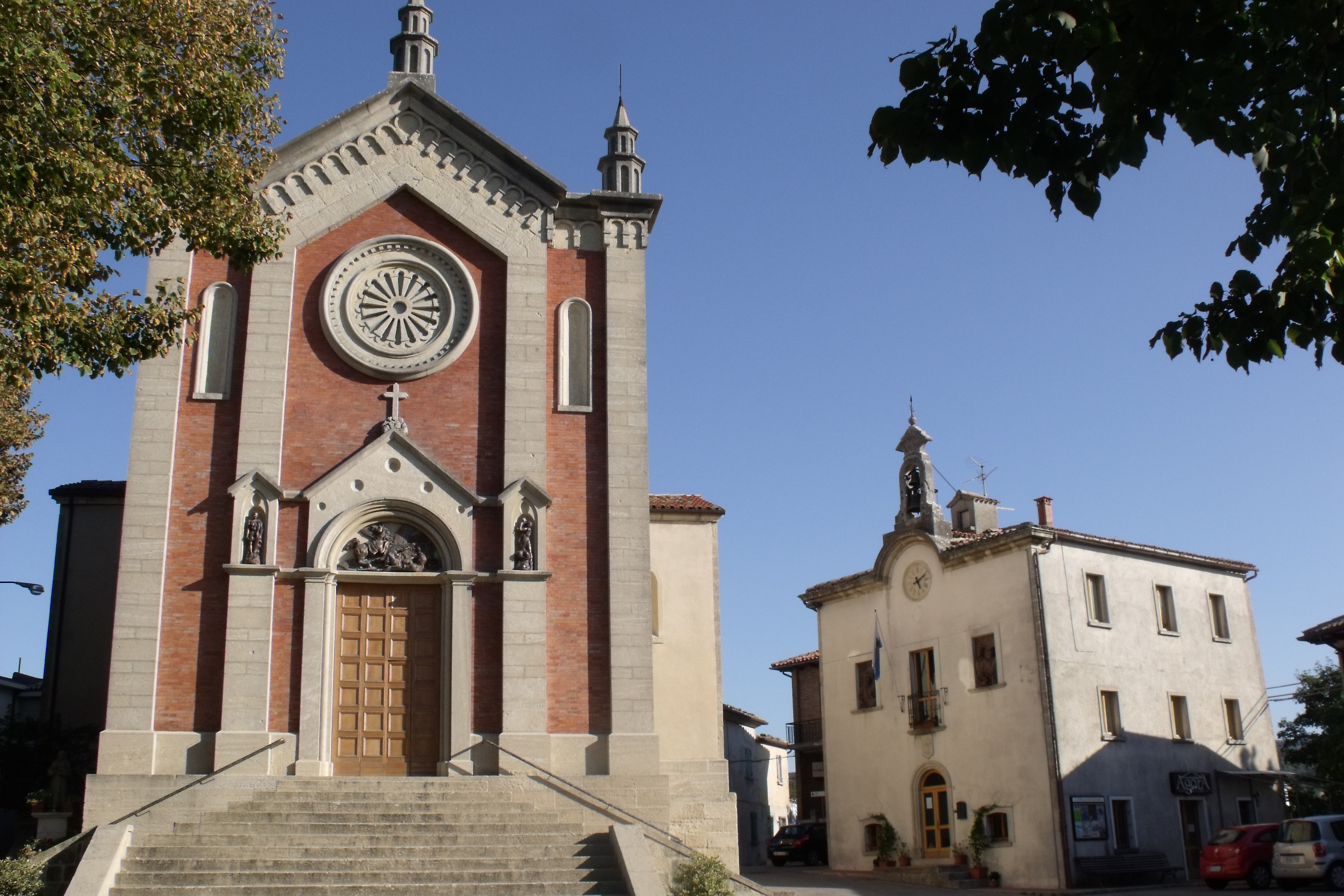
Church of San Paolo Apostolo and the town hall (Casa del Castello) in Faetano

Chiesa di San Paolo apostolo is a church in San Marino. It belongs to the Roman Catholic Diocese of San Marino-Montefeltro. It was built from 1898 and consecrated in 1917.
