= Victoria Schultz =

Finnish media professional

Victoria Schulz
- Born: 1941 (age 84–85); Helsinki, Finland
- Occupations: Photographer, Director
- Website: https://www.schultz.film

Victoria Schultz is a Finnish photographer and documentary film producer. Born in Helsinki, Finland, she attended a school run by nuns from St. Louis, Missouri and studied at the University of Helsinki where she received a master's degree in languages and literature. She wrote her master's thesis in 1964 on the work of the African American writer James Baldwin. In 1967, she arrived in New York where she obtained another master's from Columbia University School of Journalism. It was there that she focused on film and photography that centered on social upheavals.

== Early life ==
Schultz was born in 1941 in Helsinki, Finland. Growing up, Schultz had a passion for books, comics and magazines that combined images and texts. Also, as an avid movie-goer, she developed her love for strong, visual narration. As she became a documentary filmmaker, she focused first on developing factual stories.

== Career ==
During the 1970s, Schultz was a correspondent for the Finnish radio and television in the United States and Latin America. It was during this time that she covered the Nicaraguan Revolution and made the film, Women In Arms, which showed women's powerful and important roles in this uprising.

The general strike in Nicaragua occurred in June 1979 and one month later, war broke out and the overthrow of the Somoza family dictatorship occurred.

She covered the Nicaraguan revolution as a reporter for WBAI radio and the Finnish Broadcasting Company. She also served as a photographer. Women in Arms portrays the brave roles of the Sandinista women in the revolution. It won awards in many countries and was shown extensively in the United States on college campuses, by the Nicaraguan Film Industry, and at art theatres including the in New York City at Bleecker Street Cinema, and the Museum of Modern Art. It is still being shown and also used as a visual reference to the days of the Nicaraguan revolution.

In the late 1980s, Schultz was employed by the United Nations as a film producer and director. Her role was to cover trouble spots around the world where the UN had missions. She specialized in disarmament issues and was sent to Iraq to search for weapons of mass destruction. Her documentaries on these issues were shown worldwide. She was also a reporter for CNN and a senior TV-producer with the UN mission in Kosovo. It was in the 2000s that she devoted herself to photography. Selections of her photographs are included in the National Library of France, Bibliothèque nationale de France.

Now she focuses on making independent short films and memoirs. She combines still photos from her archives, film from her documentaries, as well as newly shot footage in these films. She divides her time between New York, Paris and Helsinki.

Schultz's early work includes many reports and films on social issues. Schultz made award-winning documentaries that were shown worldwide. She produced award-winning reports on post war Kosovo in the Balkans in 1999 for CNN World Report. Among the documentaries she produced at the United Nations are two films on the search for weapons of mass destruction in Iraq, Hide and Seek in Iraq and Secrets in the Sand. These were broadcast all the around world.

She also made an independent documentary called Covering Chiapas. This film was on the Zapatista Movement, where the Zapatistas took over territory in Chiapas, Mexico and marched into the Cathedral in San Cristóbal de las Casas. The film covers the details of this noted event.

Starting in the early 2000s up until now, Schultz focused on her passion for still photography. She uses her life experiences as an inspiration and creates stories using still photos. She not only takes pictures of others but frequently includes herself in her photos.

== Photography ==
Schultz's first portfolio, "Stories from Inside the Camera", is a series of photos portraying dramatic moments from her past. The series includes subsections, "Yes and No in my Sister's Soul," which includes the use of negative film to portray the self, "Shadowboxing in my Father's Eye," which depicts the F-stops in the camera's lens, and "Not Much Fun to be His Other One," which is a depiction of a couple's struggle.

Another portfolio includes "Animal Tales," "Escapees from the Zoo" and "I Married a Crocodile." In the first subsection, the series of photos includes the wearing of animal masks to accentuate human urges and anxieties. The second involves a bride and a large, live reptile to represent our partner choices in life.

The third portfolio series, "Social Matters," touches upon world affairs. It includes the series "Amerika", "Que Viva Mexico!" and "Activists of the Occupy Movement." Without the constraints of CNN or the UN broadcasting company, she expresses her personal thoughts in her photos as well as her sense of humor.

== Films ==
Funded by the Ford Foundation, Rockefeller Foundation, and the New York Council of the Arts, Victoria Schultz directed and produced many independent documentaries, such as Women in Arms, "La Frontera" "Covering Chiapas" "Argentina under Tyranny" and "Holy Terror.".

Back to making films, Schultz has recently produced and directed a feature film YOU NEVER KNOW, which tells the story of a young woman who returns to her native Finland and discovers family secrets having to do with Soviet Russia's control of the country. Her distributor in New York is CINEMA GUILD. She is currently working on a series of memoir films, with each one depicting a fragment from her long and adventure-filled life.
