= Francesca Todde =

Italian photographer (born 1981)

Francesca Todde (born 1981) is an Italian photographer and publisher, living in Milan. Most of her personal projects are focused on the relation between humans and animals.

== Life and work ==
Todde was born in Padua, Italy. She studied at the Accademia di Belle Arti di Carrara in Carrara, Italy.

Her book Transhumance describes two transhumance journeys in France (2013) and Italy (2015) where people and thousands of animals traveled together for hundreds of kilometers. Her book A Sensitive Education is focused on "the symbiotic relationship between animals and humans", through the bird educator Tristan Plot. It was made between 2017 and 2019 in France. Her book Iuzza (2024) uses photographs by Todde and texts by Luca Reffo to describe something of the life of Italian actress and writer Goliarda Sapienza. Between 2017 and 2024, Todde travelled to the places where Sapienza lived in Italy and accessed her archives.

She is co-founder of the Italian publisher Départ Pour l'Image, alongside Luca Reffo.

== Publications ==
- Selva
- Transhumance
- Along the Hills Crests
- An Emotional Reintegration
- Centaures
- A Sensitive Education. Milan: Départ Pour l'Image, 2020. With text in English by Luca Reffo and Todde. Translated by Anna Eva De Chiara. ISBN 978-88-944622-2-7. Edition of 300 copies.
  - Second edition. Milan: Départ Pour l'Image, 2021. ISBN 978-88-944622-2-7. Edition of 500 copies.
- Iuzza. Goliarda Sapienza. Milan: Départ Pour l'Image, 2024. With texts by Luca Reffo. ISBN 978-88-947598-7-7. In English, Italian, and French. Edition of 1500 copies.

== Solo exhibitions ==
- Transhumance, Underpasso della Stua, Largo Europa, Padua, Italy, November–December 2015. Curated by Simone Falso and organised by the Department of Culture of the Municipality of Padua
- A Sensitive Education, Cortona on the Move, Cortona, Italy, July–October 2021
- Iuzza On Goliarda Sapienza, Centre photographique Rouen Normandie, Rouen, France, October 2024 – January 2025
