= Rena Effendi =

Azerbaijani freelance photographer

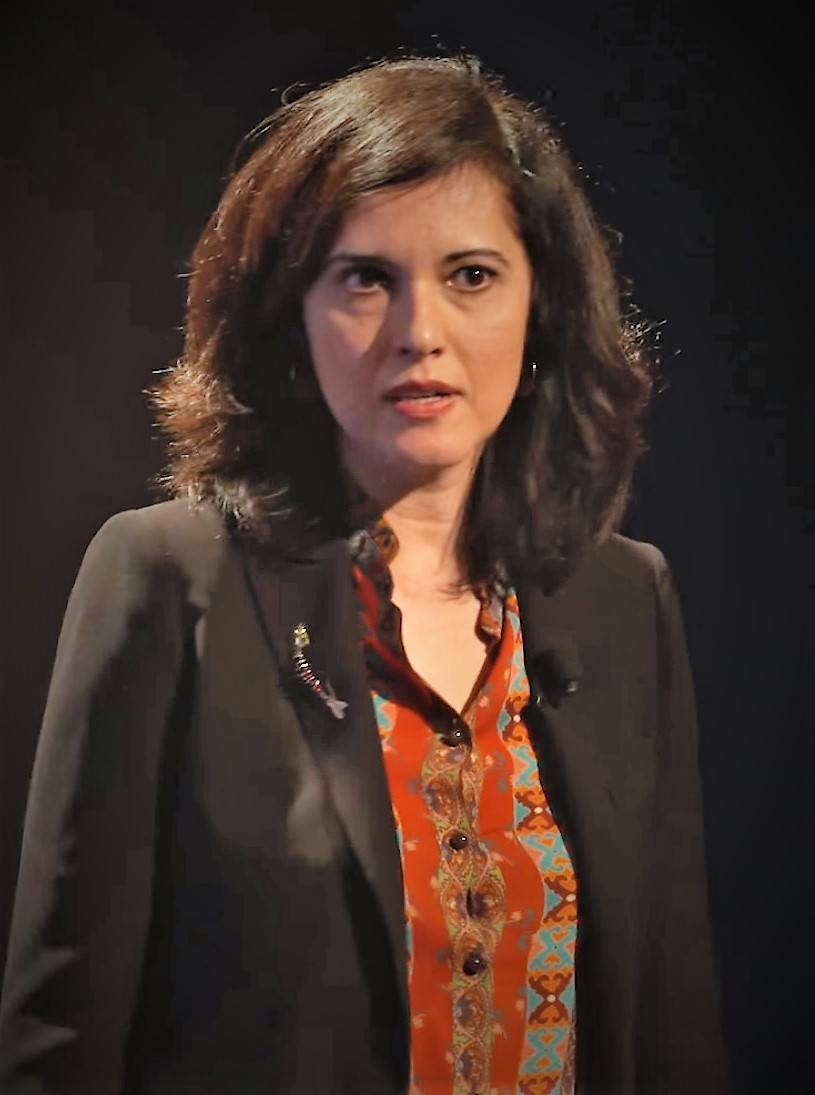
Effendi speaks at the World Economic Forum in 2019

Rena Effendi (born 1977) is an Azerbaijani freelance photographer. Her work focuses on themes of environment, post-conflict society, the effects of oil industry on people, and social disparity.

== Life ==
Effendi was born in 1977 in Baku. She studied linguistics at the Azerbaijan State Institute of Languages.

Effendi began photographing in 2001 and became a full-time photographer in 2005 after quitting her job as an Economic Development Specialist at the United States Agency for International Development in Baku. Effendi's first monograph Pipe Dreams, published by Mets & Schilt, focuses on how the oil industry affected the lives of ordinary citizens in Azerbaijan, Georgia and Turkey along the Baku–Tbilisi–Ceyhan pipeline. She initially got a commercial assignment from BP, the oil consortium that operates this pipeline from Azerbaijan via Georgia to the southern Turkish port of Ceyhan. While photographing this promotional material, she discovered that just a small percentage of the urban population in her country is benefiting from the oil boom. Over the course of 6 years, this work was turned into Pipe Dreams.

Effendi has also produced stories in Chernobyl after the nuclear disaster of 1986, transgender people in Istanbul, village life in Khinalug, the Russia–Georgia war of 2008, life of youth in Tehran, Russia, and Cairo. She published this work in 2010 by the title of Chernobyl: Still Life in the Zone. In the work, she decided to showcase people's life in the zone instead of a memento.

Her work has been published in the International Herald Tribune, Newsweek, Financial Times, Time Magazine, National Geographic, Marie Claire, Courrier International, Le Monde and L'Uomo Vogue. Her work has also been shown at the Saatchi Gallery in London, Aperture Gallery in New York, Istanbul Modern, Venice Biennial and Art Basel.

== Publications ==
- USAID Azerbaijan: From relief to development. Baku: USAID/Caucasus Azerbaijan, c2003. OCLC 62496020
- Pipe Dreams: A Chronicle of Lives along the Pipeline. Amsterdam: Mets & Schilt, 2009. ISBN 978-9053306956, on Swiss exhibitions in 2009
  - Pipe dreams. Eine Chronik des Lebens entlang der Pipeline. Bern: Benteli, 2009. ISBN 9783716516034.
  - Las quimeras del petróleo: la vida cerca del oleoducto. Barcelona: Blume, 2009. ISBN 9788498014365.
  - Линия Жизни. Moskva: Izdateli L. Gusev i M. Sidorenko, 2009. ISBN 9785903788101.
- Liquid Land. Amsterdam: Schilt, 2012. ISBN 978-9053307892.
  - Land ohne festen Boden. Die vergessenen Menschen von Baku. Bern: Benteli, 2012. ISBN 9783716517444.
  - Жидкая земля. Moskva: Treemedia, 2012. ISBN 9785903788200.

== Awards ==
Effendi has won the Fifty Crows Documentary Award, the Mario Giacomelli Memorial Award and the Getty Images Editorial Grant. In 2008, National Geographic Magazine honored her with an All Roads Photography Award, in 2009 she received the Young Photographer in the Caucasus Award, and in 2011 she won a Prince Claus Award. She won 3rd prize in the Observed Portraits category at the 2014 World Press Photo Contest, Amsterdam, Netherlands for "Transylvania: Built on Grass".
