= Diana Lui =

Diana Lui (born May 7, 1968) is a Malaysian artist, photographer and filmmaker. She is known for her large format photographic portraits of today's growing hybrid generation of multicultural and multiethnic individuals.

Diana Lui was born in Malaysia and has been based in Paris for more than 10 years. She graduated from the Art Center College of Design in Pasadena, California in 1992. A master with the 8×10 inch view camera, Diana Lui develops long term photographic and artistic projects over several years. Intimate Portraits, what Lui calls "intimate/psychological/anthropological portraits on today’s hybrid generation of new nomads who have lost their roots and origins due to the onslaught of globalism" was initiated 20 years ago and continues to develop to this day. Lui's silent portraits show the existential urgency of each individual's existence through the space or objects surrounding him/her, the intrinsic gestures and physical positioning of the individual within his/her environment. With this constantly evolving series, she has won several awards including France's 20th Bourse du Talent (Young Talent Award for Photography) and the Prix Kodak de la Critique Photographique (Kodak Critics’ Award), Belgium's Prix National de la Photographie Ouverte du Musée de la Photographie à Charleroi and was in 2008 a finalist for the Prix de la Fondation HSBC pour la Photographie.

== Background ==
Diana Lui's interest in different art forms is due to her early education in the arts in Malaysia ranging from Chinese ink painting to the performance arts such as ballet and contemporary dance. Her studies in the fine arts in UCLA (University California Los Angeles) were guided by teachers who were prominent artists of the 1960s Post-Modernist period such as Robert Heinecken and Jan Stüssy. In UCLA, Lui experimented with drawing, painting, printmaking, sculpting and photography. She further deepened her art studies at the prestigious Art Center College of Design in Pasadena, California. Her graduation project combined printing processes such as photogravure and platinum/palladium printing in order to create subtle black and white portraits taken with an 8x10 inch view camera. Lui was able to successfully master these alternative printing processes thanks to her teacher Anthony Zepeda, Los Angeles master printmaker, a former printer of Rauschenberg's. Though photography has predominated her work, her recent projects have evolved into new themes that push the limits of photography by combining installation, performance, experimental short films, painting and drawing. Lui's transient life between three different continents has developed in her a heightened sense of "rootlessness", loss of origins and traditional values. This "rootlessness" has become the center from which her art and research has taken shape.

== Publications ==
- Retratos Intimos, text in English and Spanish by Tomás Rodríguez Soto (curator) & Adam Beinash (Art & Auction magazine), Museo de Bellas Artes de Caracas, Venezuela, 2005. ISBN 9802382582
- Cities of the Immortals, text by Richard Vine (Art in America magazine) & Jean Loh (guest curator), Guangdong Museum of Art, China, Beaugeste Editions, Shanghai, 2007.
- Another Voice, We..., text in English and Chinese by Xiao Xiao Lan (curator), Shanghai Art Museum, 2008. ISBN 9787806789186
- Pur-Sang, Diana Lui & Klavdij Sluban, text by Thierry Dumanoir (curator), Editions Filigranes, Hors Collection, 2010. ISBN 9782350461946
- Trees, Individuals & Sexuality, Aura Gallery, Shanghai, 2006
- Méduses,(in French) text by Anne Biroleau-Lemagny (general curator, Bibliothèque nationale de France), collectors' portfolio of 15 original prints, Editions Chez Higgins, Collection Vanités, Paris, 2011.
- Chez Robert Frank,(in French) photos and text by Diana Lui & Klavdij Sluban, collectors' portfolio of 15 original prints, Editions Chez Higgins, Collection Témoignages, Paris, 2011.
