= Annapurna Dutta =

Indian Professional Photographer

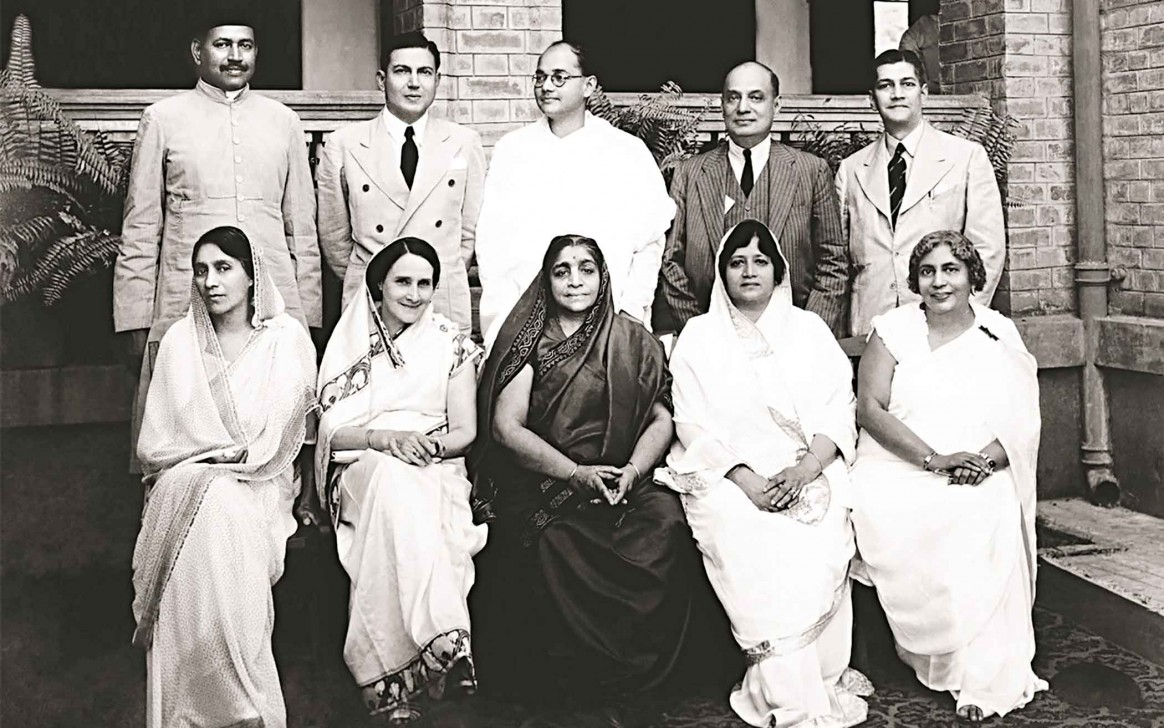
At "Kashana", the house of Hassan Suhrawardy, Kolkata, 1937: Sitting (left to right): Aruna Asaf Ali, Nellie Sengupta, Sarojini Naidu, Shahbanu Begum, and unknown. The photograph was taken by Annapurna Dutta, "Photographer Mashima".

Annapurna Dutta (1894–1976) was one of the early female professional photographers from India. At a time when studio-photography was a male-dominated profession, and accepting employment outside the domestic home was uncommon for women, Annapurna gained popularity as "Photographer Mashima" amidst her younger contemporaries. She did not own a studio, but instead worked on a commission-basis, visiting people's homes to click portraits. Most of these commissions came from families where women observed a purdah. She also developed and printed the pictures herself.

== Life and career ==
Born in undivided Bengal, Annapurna was married at the age of 12 to Upendranath Dutta, a lawyer by profession and a keen, but amateur photographer. She learnt painting and photography, later taking up photography professionally at the age of 25. She supported her family through earnings from her commissions.

Her commissions came from elite families such as those of the singer Abbas Uddin, poet Jasimuddin, and the family of Hasan Suhrawardy.
