= Saana Wang =

Finnish fine art photographer

- Born: 1979 (age 46–47); Helsinki, Finland
- Education: Aalto University; Gerrit Rietveld Academie
- Known for: Photography

Saana Wang (born 1979 in Helsinki) is a Finnish fine art photographer. She graduated from the Gerrit Rietveld Academie in 2004, the Photo Global Program of the School of Visual Arts in New York, and the Aalto University School of Arts, Design and Architecture in Helsinki, Finland.

In her photographs, Wang depicts the changing of social structure and city urbanization in modern China. Wang uses the masks of the traditional Beijing opera to transform the local Chinese residents into fictional characters. As a decisive step towards defamiliarization, she turns the people's spare living rooms into a stage. Wang conveys multilayered reality that express structures of power as well as tensions between the different elements in the picture.

Wang has had exhibitions in New York City, European countries such as Finland, Germany, Denmark, Switzerland, as well as East Asia. Wang won the International Photography Prize International Talent Support – Photo Award 2009. Wang is part of the "photographic movement The Helsinki School". She is often invited to participate panel discussions in institutions such as The American-Scandinavian Foundation (known as Scandinavian House) in Manhattan, NY.

Wang lives and works in New York City. She has also lived in Beijing, China.
