= Jane Shackleton =

Irish photographer (1843–1909)

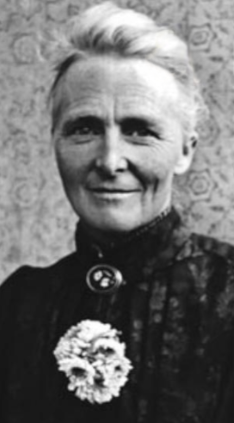
- Born: Jane Wigham Edmundson; 30 January 1843; Dublin, Ireland
- Died: 5 April 1909 (aged 66); Lucan, Dublin, Ireland
- Other names: Jane Edmundson Shackleton, Jane W. Shackleton, Jane Wigham Shackleton
- Occupation: photographer
- Years active: 1880–1909
- Relatives: Ernest Shackleton (cousin-in-law)

Jane Shackleton (30 January 1843 – 5 April 1909) was a pioneering Irish photographer. Of the upper-class, she took atypical photographs for her era, focusing on a photojournalistic approach to her subjects, showing the development of Ireland during its period of industrialization.

== Early life ==
Jane Wigham Edmundson was born on 30 January 1843 in Dublin, Ireland to Mary (née Wigham) and Joshua Edmundson. Her parents were Anglo-Irish. Joshua owned and operated a home improvement store which provided a number of services from ironmongery to furnishings, as well as gas lighting and sanitation. He was descended of the Cromwellian soldier, William Edmundson, who founded Quakerism in Ireland. Mary, originally from Edinburgh was the daughter of John Wigham and became the sole support of her five children when Joshua died in 1848. Keeping the business, Mary taught her children to be independent. On 6 March 1866, Edmundson married Joseph Fisher Shackleton, a first cousin of the polar explorer Ernest Shackleton. Her husband's family operated mills in the midlands, sparking an interest for Shackleton in industrial development and architecture.

== Career ==
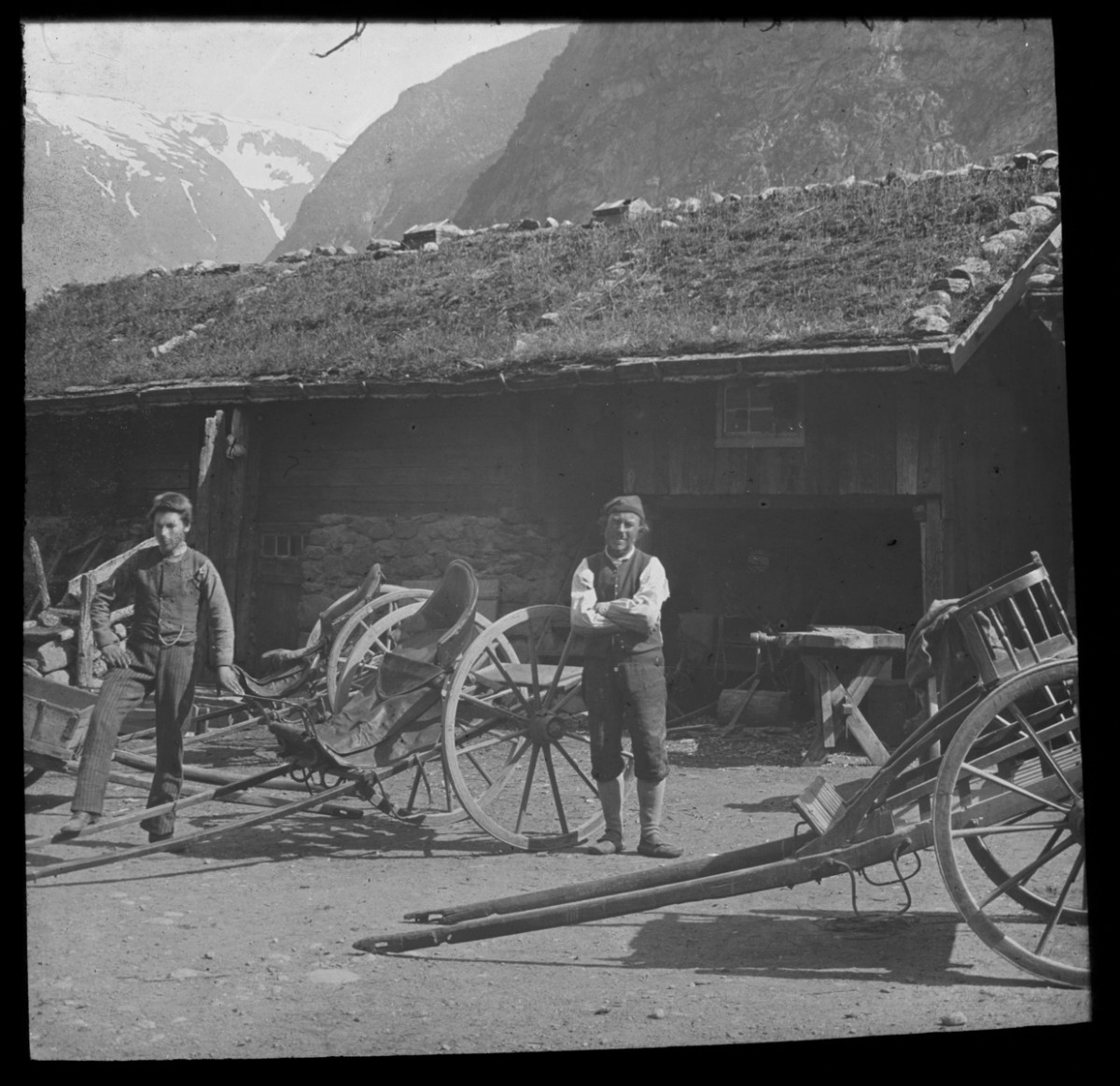
One of Shackleton's photographs

The Shackletons were well-to-do and made their home in the Anna Liffey House in the Dublin suburb of Lucan. The house was opulently fitted with modern conveniences, fireplace and water views and adjoined the family's Shackleton Mills. Built in the late Georgian style around 1815, she raised her children, William (born 26 May 1867), Mary (born 4 March 1870), and Chrissie on the estate. Developing an interest in photography, in the mid-1880s, Shackleton began as an amateur photographer, taking portraits of her family members. From the beginning, she developed her own film and between 1880 and 1890 she took over 1,000 photographs.

Many of her images reflected her interest in industrialization including photographs of industrial architecture and waterways. She also had an intense interest in the Aran Islands and took many shots featuring working-class people and culture on the islands. The majority of photographers of her day took images of romantic settings, hoping to capture the beauty of their surroundings, but Shackleton utilized a more documentary approach, similar to modern photojournalists, producing images which reflected the every-day reality of life. Among her subjects were harvesters, railways and stone cottages, as she sought to capture images of Ireland's transformation from an agricultural society to an urban, industrialized nation.

Shackleton's photographs of people captured the drudgery of working-class people, showing their poverty and lack of adequate footwear, as well as the dilapidated housing where they lived. While other pictures, like a 1903 photograph of a workshop, captured the O'Conor Boathouse on an island in Lough Allen. Her black and white images were usually candid shots and not posed portraits. Shackelton travelled through the waterways of Ireland aboard her motor boat, The Pearl, boating along the River Shannon and making nine trips to the Aran Islands, including Inis Mór and Inis Meáin between 1891 and 1906. The family excursions often included camping trips and picnics in the Wicklow Mountains.

From 1889, Shackleton gave lectures, illustrating her talks with lantern slides, which she had developed. She was elected as a member of the Royal Society of Antiquaries of Ireland in 1892 and made numerous excursions with the society, documenting Ireland's monuments and historical sites. In 1895, she traveled with the Royal Society to the Inishkea Islands in County Mayo, and at other times visited Inishmurray in County Sligo and Clare Island in County Mayo, documenting her trips with photographs.

== Death and legacy ==
Shackleton died on 5 April 1909 at her home in Lucan. In 2002, the Fingal County Council purchased the Anna Liffey House and Shackleton Mills property, which had continued operating as a flour mill until 1998. The buildings are listed on the National Inventory of Architectural Heritage as significant architectural structures, because of their impact on the ecological, social and technological development of Ireland. In 2012, Collins Press released Jane W Shackleton's Ireland, a collection of Shackleton's photographs compiled by Christiaan Corlett, an archaeologist with the National Monuments Service specializing in Irish culture.

In 2013, the Mountmellick Public Library in County Laois, featured a collection of Shackleton's photographs, noting that her archives contain one of the largest collections of photography for a woman of Ireland. Jonathan Shackleton, Jane Shackleton's great-grandson and a Fellow of the Royal Geographical Society in London, presents lectures on the significance of Shackleton's archive in preserving the cultural development of Ireland.
