= Elena Mrozovskaya =

Russian photographer (before 1892–1941)

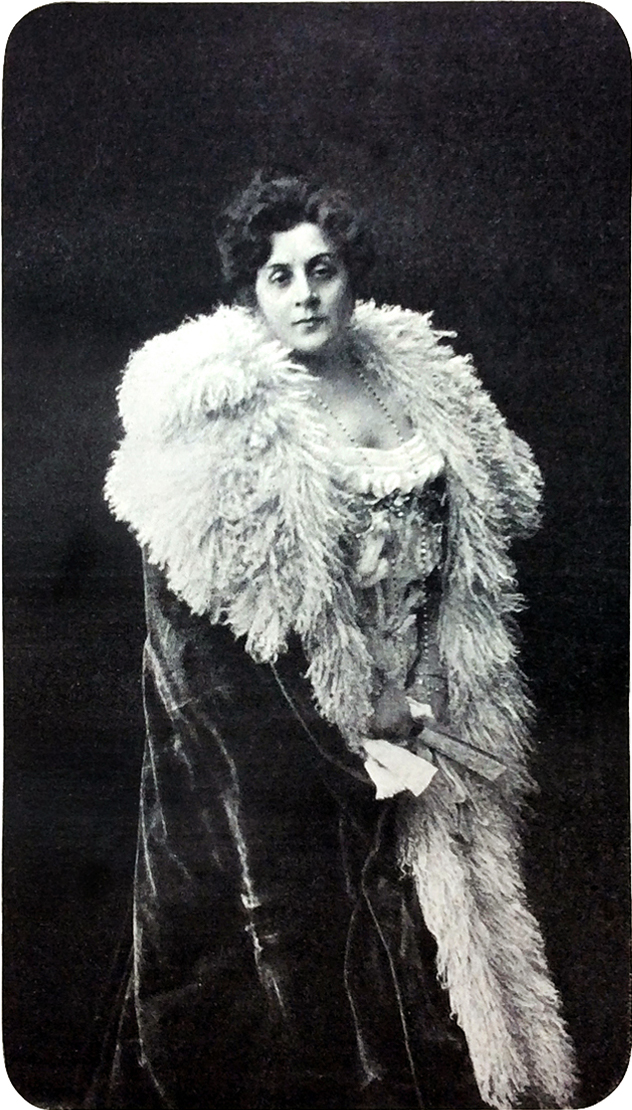
Elena Mrozovskaya before 1917

Elena Lukinichna Mrozovskaya or Helène de Mrosovsky (née Knyazhevich; Russian: Елена Лукинична Мрозовская née Княжевич; fl. 1892 – c. 1941) was a Russian and Soviet professional photographer of Montenegrin descent.

== Life and career ==
Mrozovskaya's ex-husband, Bronislav (after accepting orthodoxy in 1904 - Vladimir) Pavlovich Mrozovsky, was a mechanical engineer and painter, and his uncle (possible), Iosif Ivanovich Mrozovsky, became the military governor-general of Moscow from 1915 to 1917. Mrozovskaya herself was originally a teacher and sales clerk. She studied photography at the Russian Technical Society, finishing in 1892, and then continued her studies with Nadar in Paris. Returning to St. Petersburg, she opened a studio there in 1894. In the 1920s, she was living in Serovo, a district of St. Petersburg. She died in 1941 in Repino, another district of St. Petersburg.

== Photography ==
Mrozovskaya's subjects included Nikolai Rimsky-Korsakov, Mathilde Kschessinska, Vera Komissarzhevskaya, and other artists, writers, and actors of the time. Her photos of the interior of the Saint Petersburg Conservatory, taken beginning in 1896, are among the earliest recordings of the conservatory, and in 1897 she was named its official photographer. She won a bronze medal at the General Art and Industrial Exposition of Stockholm (1897) and a silver medal at the Exposition Universelle (1900) in Paris, and participated as well in the Liège International (1905).

== Collections and exhibits ==
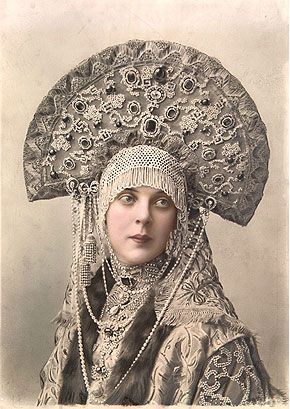
Princess Olga Orlova at the 1903 Ball

One of her photos, a hand-tinted image of Princess Olga Orlova wearing a kokoshnik at the 1903 Ball in the Winter Palace, is in the collection of the Hermitage Museum and was sent to the Hermitage Rooms of Somerset House in London in 2003, as part of a traveling exhibit celebrating St. Petersburg's tricentennial. Another of her tinted photos, "Portrait of girl in Little Russia costume", is in the collection of the Moscow House of Photography, and was exhibited in Amsterdam in early 2013 as part of an exhibit organized by the Russian Ministry of Culture. Many photos by Mrozovskaya are kept in the collection of the St. Petersburg Conservatory, and several more are in the collection of the Russian State Archive of Literature and Art.
