= Tatsiana Tsyhanova =

Belarusian photographer (born 1978)

Tatyana Tsyhanova (born 1978) is a Belarusian photographer known for her children images and photo portraits.

Tsyhanova is a member of the Belarusian Public Association of Photographers, the Belarusian Art Photography Club, the International Federation of Photographic Art (FIAP), the Photographic Society of America (PSA).

She graduated from Belarusian State Pedagogical University named after Maxim Tank in 2001 and the Institute of Advanced Training and Retraining of Belarusian National Technical University specializing in web design and computer graphics in 2006.

Tsyhanova had been teaching computer graphics subjects, the theory of design and color science in Belarusian National Technical University from 2006 to 2017.

After the birth of her daughter in 2010, Tsyhanova joined her life with photography as a professional.

At the end of 2017, she was awarded the gratitude of the Ministry of Culture of the Republic of Belarus for her many years of creative work and high professionalism.

In February 2018, Tsyhanova has got an Honour of the International Federation of Photographic Art and become the first woman photographer from the Republic of Belarus with Diploma of an Artist FIAP.

Tsyhanova was a judge of the 2nd VOUBS International Photography Awards, Proify Awards 2017 and a member of the alternative judging panel Belarusian photo contests.

Tsyhanova specializes in the field of portrait art photography.

== Collective exhibitions ==
- LifePressFoto 2018 in National University "Ostrog Academy", Ukraine
- International photo exhibition "We are from Belarus", Israel
- Creative exhibition of two authors dedicated to their awarding with Honour FIAP 2018, Belarus
- Pannonia Reflection 2018, Slovenia
- Sony World Photography Awards & Martin Parr - 2017 Exhibition in Somerset House, London, UK
- Defsad 2017, Turkey
- Salon Daguerre 2017, France
- Cheltenham 2017, United Kingdom
- Pannonia Reflection 2017, Slovenia
- 4383 Days of Childhood 2017, Belarus

== Personal exhibitions ==
Children's time 2017, Belarus

We are from childhood 2017, Belarus

== Achievements in photography ==
Tsyhanova have won several awards in photography such as the 2nd Prize in the category of Photomanipulation among professionals in Monochrome Photography Awards 2017, the 3rd Prize in the category Fine Art among professionals in the 4th edition Fine Art Photography Awards, title of Winner of the competition Isolating the Subject Photo Contest.
