= Juliana Stein =

Juliana Scotá Stein (born in Passo Fundo - RS, 1970) is a visual artist and photographer. She graduated in Psychology from Universidade Federal do Paraná (UFPR) in 1992 and lived in Florence and Venice where she studied art. She continued to work with photography during the 1990s, developing her craft.

Stein's work is based in experimentation and poetic reading, leading to a reflection on the production process and rendering of the final image. She has achieved critical success in Brazil and abroad, participating in the 29th Bienal de São Paulo and joining the Latin American pavilion at the 55th Bienal de Veneza in 2013.

== Exhibitions ==
- 2000 – III Bienal Internacional de Fotografia Cidade de Curitiba, Brasil
- 2010 – 29º Bienal de São Paulo, São Paulo, Brasil
- 2013 – 55. Esposizione Internazionale d’Arte la Biennale di Venezia, Veneza, Itália
- 2014 – Darkest Water, Crone Galerie, Berlim, Alemanha
- 2018 – It’s not clear until the night falls, Museu Oscar Niemeyer, Brasil
- 2018 – Bienal Mercosul, Porto Alegre, Brasil

== Awards ==
- 2001 – Itaú Cultural

== Collections ==
- Museu Oscar Niemeyer, Curitiba, Brasil
- Museu da Fotografia de Braga, Braga, Portugal
- Museu de Arte Contemporânea, Curitiba, Brasil
- Museum of 21 Century, Langenlois, Austria
- Fundação Cultural de Curitiba, Curitiba, Brasil
