= Galina Sanko =

Soviet photojournalist

- Галина Захаровна Санько
- Sanko at Kursk in 1943
- Born: 1904; Sudzha, Kursk Gubernaia, Russian Empire
- Died: 1981 (aged 76–77); Moscow, Russia
- Occupation: photojournalist
- Years active: 1938–1981
- Known for: World War II photography

Galina Zakharovna Sanko (Russian: Галина Захаровна Санько; 1904–1981) was a Soviet photographer who worked as a photojournalist and was one of only five women who served as a war photographer during World War II. She was one of the most noted Soviet photographers and known in the West, winning awards both at home and abroad.

== Biography ==
Galina Zakharovna Sanko was born in 1904 and as a child had been impressed with photographs of women reporters in magazines like Ogoniok (Russian: Огонёк) and Spotlight (Russian: Прожектор). She took photography courses to gain a basic understanding of techniques and then worked as a laboratory assistant in the editorial department of the newspaper Water Transport (Russian: Водный транспорт). By the early 1930s, she had become a professional photographer and asked to participate in an Arctic expedition. She went with the icebreaker Krassin to the Kamchatka Peninsula and Commander Islands and wintered on Wrangell Island taking photographs of the area and visiting the memorial to Vitus Bering on Bering Island. Sanko also photographed a journey to the Far East, but found her true calling in photojournalism during World War II.

After the persecution of her husband in 1938, Sanko dedicated her life to photography. When the war broke out, she asked to go to the front as a war correspondent. Initially, Sanko trained as a nurse and then studied driving and auto mechanics. She bandaged the wounded and once she had proved her fitness for battle was allowed as one of only five women who served as war photographers. She worked for the magazine Frontline Illustration (Russian: Фронтовая иллюстрация) and took photographs of battles in Kursk, Moscow and Stalingrad, taking pictures at Bryansk and the Don Campaign near Stallingrad. In 1944 during the northern offensive, she took photographs of the siege of Leningrad. Near the end of the war, she took photographs of the fighting against Japan. She was seriously injured twice during the war. In the movie Wild Honey (Russian: Дикий мед) (1967) based on the novel by Leonid Pervomaisky, there is a scene based upon a real-life event in which Sanko escaped in the nick of time from being fired upon by a German tank.

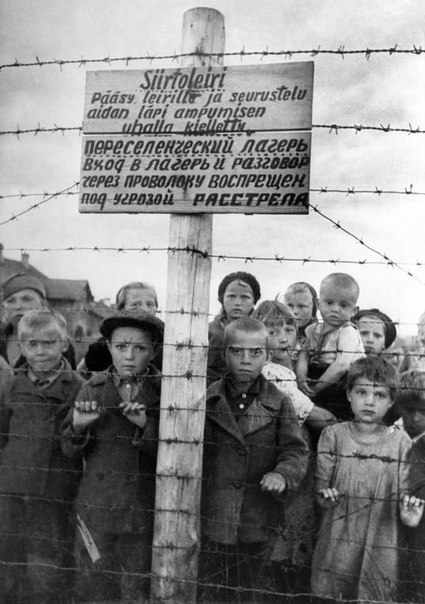
Photograph of Russian children at a formerly Finnish-run transfer camp in Petrozavodsk on 29 June 1944, one day after the Finns left the area. The sign reads, in Finnish and Russian: "Transfer camp. Entry to the camp and socializing through the fence are forbidden, violators will be shot."

At the end of the war, Sanko worked for the magazine Ogoniok (Russian: Огонек) but until the 1960s, her work was banned and hidden in an archive. Accused of distorting the truth, with her photographs of the liberation of the Petrozavodsk camp, Sanko was exonerated when 20 years after the war, she returned to the Republic of Karelia and found one of the children she had photographed in the camp. After publishing "Claudia 20 years later", her archive was opened in 1966 and Sanko participated in many photographic exhibitions at home and abroad. She was awarded the Order of the Red Star. Sanko died in Moscow in 1981.

== Legacy ==
At least one of her images, "Prisoners of Fascism" was used as evidence in the Nuremberg trials. In 1966 at the international exhibition "Interpressphoto-66" of Moscow, Sanko received gold medals for each of her photos "Prisoners of Fascism" and "Twenty Years Later". Two years later, at a Parisian exhibition, her photographs of the liberation of Petrozavodsk received the Grand Prize. In 1981 Sanko was awarded the title "Honorary Citizen of the City of Gdov" for her photographs documenting the devastation of the city in 1944 and its liberation from Nazi occupation.

Sanko's gift was not to photograph the war, but the results of the battle upon the soldiers themselves, the landscape, or non-combatants. Though mostly unknown in the West, Soviet photographers and photojournalists works began to make their way out from behind the Iron Curtain in the 1990s. In 1996 Christie's in New York sold 279 prints from 24 photographers, including Sanko, to a collector in San Francisco. Two of Sanko's photographs, one showing boots on fallen, snow-covered German soldiers and another "Spring in the Ukraine" (1943), showed the idyllic countryside in which a mortally wounded German soldier lay in grass with his helmet, were described in detail in a piece published in The New York Times.
