= Tal Shochat =

Israeli photographer (born 1974)

- טל שוחט
- Born: 1974 (age 51–52); Netanya, Israel
- Education: HaMidrasha Art School, Beit Berl College
- Occupation: Photographer

Tal Shochat (Hebrew: טל שוחט; born 1974) is an Israeli photographer.

== Early life ==
Tal Shochat was born in 1974 in Netanya. She was educated at HaMidrasha School of Art, Beit Berl College from 1995 to 1999.

== Career ==
Shochat takes photographs of fruit trees against cloth backdrops. An article on SFGate.com explained that she " cleaned every branch and leaf before shooting five fruit trees that grow in Israel - peach, almond, pomegranate, apple and persimmon - at their peak of ripeness against a black background." In a review of an exhibit at the V&A, the Financial Times suggested her photographic method was comparable to David Buckland's.

Her artwork is in the permanent collections of the Los Angeles County Museum of Art (LACMA) in Los Angeles, California, United States, and the Victoria and Albert Museum (V&A) in London, United Kingdom. Another artwork was also held at the Art Gallery of the University of Haifa in Israel prior to its disestablishment.

== Exhibition History ==
Shochat has had numerous solo and group exhibitions, as well as being the recipient of prestigious awards for her work.

One-Person Exhibitions

1999 Marshim series, Haifa Museum of Art

2003 Queen of the Night, Rosenfeld Gallery, Tel Aviv

2005 Awakening, Rosenfeld Gallery, Tel Aviv

2005 Awakening, Andrea Meislin Gallery, New York

2007 Flying Ceiling, Herzliya Museum of Contemporary Art, Israel

2008 Sometimes it’s Cold in the Morning, Rosenfeld Gallery, Tel Aviv

2011 In a Praise of a Dream, Andrea Meislin Gallery, New York

2012 In Praise of a Dream, National Museum of American Jewish History, Philadelphia, PA

2013 License to Survive, Rosenfeld Gallery, Tel Aviv

2017 Other Days, Petach Tikva Museum of Art

2017 Lessons in Time, Rosenfeld Gallery, Tel Aviv

Group Exhibitions

2018 The Desert Shall Rejoice and Blossom: Photographs by Oded Balilty and Tal Shochat, Jewish Federation of

2019 Visions of Place: Complex Geographies in Contemporary Israeli Art, Towson

2019 Jacqueline Kahanoff: The Levant as a Parable, MUSA- Eretz Israel Museum, Tel Aviv

Cleveland

2006 Art of Living: Contemporary Photography and Video from the Israel Museum, The Contemporary Jewish

2006 Making a Scene, Haifa Museum of Art

2006 Omanut Haaretz, Reading Power Station Compound, Tel Aviv

2006 Apropos Les Demoiselles, Petach Tikva Museum of Art

2006 Raw and Cooked, The Art Gallery, University of Haifa

2007 Place Photography II, The New Gallery, Bet Gabriel on the Kinneret

2007 The Other Sea, The Artists’ House, Jerusalem

2008 Real Time: Art in Israel 1998-2008, The Israel Museum, Jerusalem

2008 Personal Landscapes: Contemporary Art from Israel, American University Museum, Washington

2008 Access to Israel: Israeli Contemporary Art, Jüdisches Museum, Frankfurt

2008 Protected Space, The Art Gallery, Kibbutz Nachshon

2008 Stills 07-08, The Art Institute Gallery, Oranim Academic College

2008 Dead End, Rosenfeld Gallery, Tel Aviv

2008 Good Kids, Rosenfeld Gallery, Tel Aviv

2009 2009 Tel Aviv Time, Tel Aviv Museum of Art

2009 League, 100 years-101 women, 101 women artists, Amiad Center, Jaffa

2009 Fireflies, CSB, The Curatorial Studies Program Gallery, Tel Aviv

2009 Ethics/ Aesthetics, Artists House, Tel Aviv

2009 Four Openings in Israeli Art, Bezalel Gallery, Tel Aviv, Israel

2009 Passing Summer, P.O.V, The Israeli Photography Festival, Tel Aviv

2010 In Detail: From the Collections of Arnie Druck, Haifa Museum of Art

2010 Family Files, Jewish Museum, Munich, Germany

2011 Professionals, Rosenfeld Gallery, Tel Aviv

2011 Dignity and Gracefulness, Felix-Nussbaum-Haus/ Kulturgeschichtliches Museum, Osnabrück, Germany

2012 Do Not Destroy: Trees, Art, and Jewish Thought, Contemporary Jewish Museum, San Francisco

2012 Light from the Middle East: New Photography, Victoria and Albert Museum, London

2013 Leaving the Land of Roses, Shulamit Gallery, Venice, California

2014 The Chicago Triangle, Haifa Museum of Art, Israel

2014 Neighbors – Photographs from Israel, Tokyo Art Museum, Japan

2015 SELF: Portraits of Artists in Their Absence, The National Academy. Museum, New York

2015 Islamic Art Now: Contemporary Art of the Middle East, Los Angeles County Museum of Art (LACMA)

2015 In Different Place, Electra Tower, Tel Aviv

2015 The Wandering Jew: an Artistic Reflection, Mane-Katz Museum, Haifa

2015 Rutgers – Camden, N.J (traveling exhibition)

2015 Visions of Place: Complex Geographies in contemporary Israeli Art, Stedman gallery

2015 Flora Palestina- Photopoetics 5, The New Gallery, Musrara, Jerusalem

2016 The Winners: Ministry of Culture and Sport Prizes for 2015, Herzliya Museum of Contemporary Art

2017 Home-Mother, Afula’s local city gallery

2017 Into the Wood: Trees in Photography, V&A Museum, London

2018 To The End of Land, National Gallery of Modern Art, New Delhi

2018 Celebrating Israel’s 70th Anniversary: Michal Rovner and Tal Shochat, Nevada Museum of Art

2018 Musée de la Chasse et de la Nature, Paris

2018 Flood, Ashdod Art Museum

2018 Voyage, Rosenfeld gallery, Tel Aviv

Museum, San Francisco

2004 Love is in the Air: Images of Romantic Love in Contemporary Israeli Art, Time for Art – Israeli Art Center, Tel

2004 Omanut Haaretz, Reading Power Station Compound, Tel Aviv

2005 Disrupted Realism, Rosenfeld Gallery, Tel Aviv

2005 Little Red Hood, DotFiftyOne Art Space, Miami

2006 Prizes in Art from the Ministry of Education, Culture and Sport, 2005, The Israel Museum, Jerusalem

2006 Far and Away: The Fantasy of Japan in Contemporary Israeli Art, The Israel Museum, Jerusalem

Aviv

1999 Graduates’ Exhibition, The Open Museum of Photography, Tel Hai Industrial Park, Israel

1999 Regarding Raffi, Nofar Gallery, Tel Aviv

2000 Graduates at Rosenfeld, Rosenfeld Gallery, Tel Aviv

2000 Arie Aroch, Pe’er Gallery, Tel Aviv

2000 Ladies and Gentlemen, Tel Aviv Museum of Art

2001 Alon Segev Gallery, Tel Aviv

2001 Sense of Wonder, Herzliya Museum of Art

2002 Mother Tongue, Museum of Art, Ein Harod, Israel

2003 Flowers, Kav 16 Gallery, Tel Aviv

2003 Every Day, Every Year, The Art Gallery, Memorial Center, Kiryat Tivon, Israel

== Scholarships and Awards ==
2005 Prize for a Young Artist, The Israeli Ministry of Education, Culture and Sport

2015 The Minister of Culture and Sport’s Visual Art Award, Israel

== Selected Collections ==
The Victoria and Albert Museum, London, England

The Israel Museum, Jerusalem

Haifa Museum of Art Collection

The Doron Sebbag Art Collection, ORS Ltd., Tel Aviv

Shalom Shpilman Collection

IDB Collection

Judah L. Magnes Museum, Berkeley, California

Los Angeles County Museum of Art (LACMA), Los Angeles, California
