= Bibi Aisha =

Afghan woman

- بي بي عایشه
- Aisha on the cover of Time Magazine
- Born: Aisha Mohammadzai; 1991 (age 34–35); Republic of Afghanistan
- Other name: Aesha Mohammadzai (legal name in the United States)
- Known for: Surviving mutilation and advocating for women's rights

Bibi Aisha (Pashto: بي بي عایشه; Bibi is a term of respect meaning "Lady"; born Aisha Mohammadzai, legal name in the United States: Aesha Mohammadzai) is an Afghan woman who fled from an abusive marriage she was forced into as a teenager, but was caught, jailed, mutilated and left to die as revenge for her escape. She was later rescued by aid workers and her story was featured in American news as an example of the effects of the Taliban's reign of terror on women. As of 2014, she lives in Maryland as the adoptive daughter of an Afghan-American couple and has received reconstructive surgery.

== Early life ==
Aisha was born in 1991 into a Mohammadzai family in Afghanistan. Her mother died when she was 2; she was sent to live with relatives shortly after. When she was 12, her father arranged a marriage between Aisha and a Taliban fighter in a practice called baad to repay a social debt from a murder committed by a member of Aisha's family. Aisha and the man were married when she was 14. Her husband and his family were abusive towards Aisha; she was physically abused, treated like a servant, and forced to sleep in an outbuilding with the family's animals. At the age of 18, she fled the abuse, but she was caught by the police, jailed for five months, and returned to her father, who then returned her to her husband. As revenge for her escape, Aisha's father-in-law, husband, and three other men of the family took Aisha to the mountains, cut off her nose and ears, and left her to die. She crawled to her uncle's house but was refused help. She was finally offered asylum by her father and her grandfather who brought her to a U.S. military base.

== Appearances in American news ==
Aisha's story first appeared in The Daily Beast in December 2009, which prompted many doctors to offer free help and reconstructive surgeries. The Grossmann Burn Foundation in California pledged to perform the necessary surgeries and began organizing for her visa in the spring of 2010.

In March 2010, Diane Sawyer of ABC News covered her story, which she would revisit in 2014.

Aisha was featured on the August 2010 cover of Time magazine and in the corresponding article, "Afghan Women and the Return of the Taliban." The cover image generated enormous international controversy. The image and the accompanying cover title, "What Happens if We Leave Afghanistan", fueled debate about the Afghan War. Her cover photo was taken by the South African photographer Jodi Bieber and awarded the World Press Photo Award in 2010. This image of Aisha is sometimes compared to the Afghan Girl photograph of Sharbat Gula taken by Steve McCurry.

== Life in the United States ==
Shortly after Time's cover in August 2010, Aisha was flown to the United States to receive free reconstructive surgery. After arriving in California, she psychologically regressed into psychogenic non-epileptic seizures, panic attacks, and self-harm that required hospitalization. Due to the events she had been subjected to, doctors determined she was not yet stable enough for the grueling reconstructive surgery, and these traumas caused her to suffer from borderline personality disorder. While her reconstructive surgery was delayed, she was taken in by the Women for Afghan Women shelter in Queens, New York. Aisha's condition improved with a change in medications, and the seizures stopped.

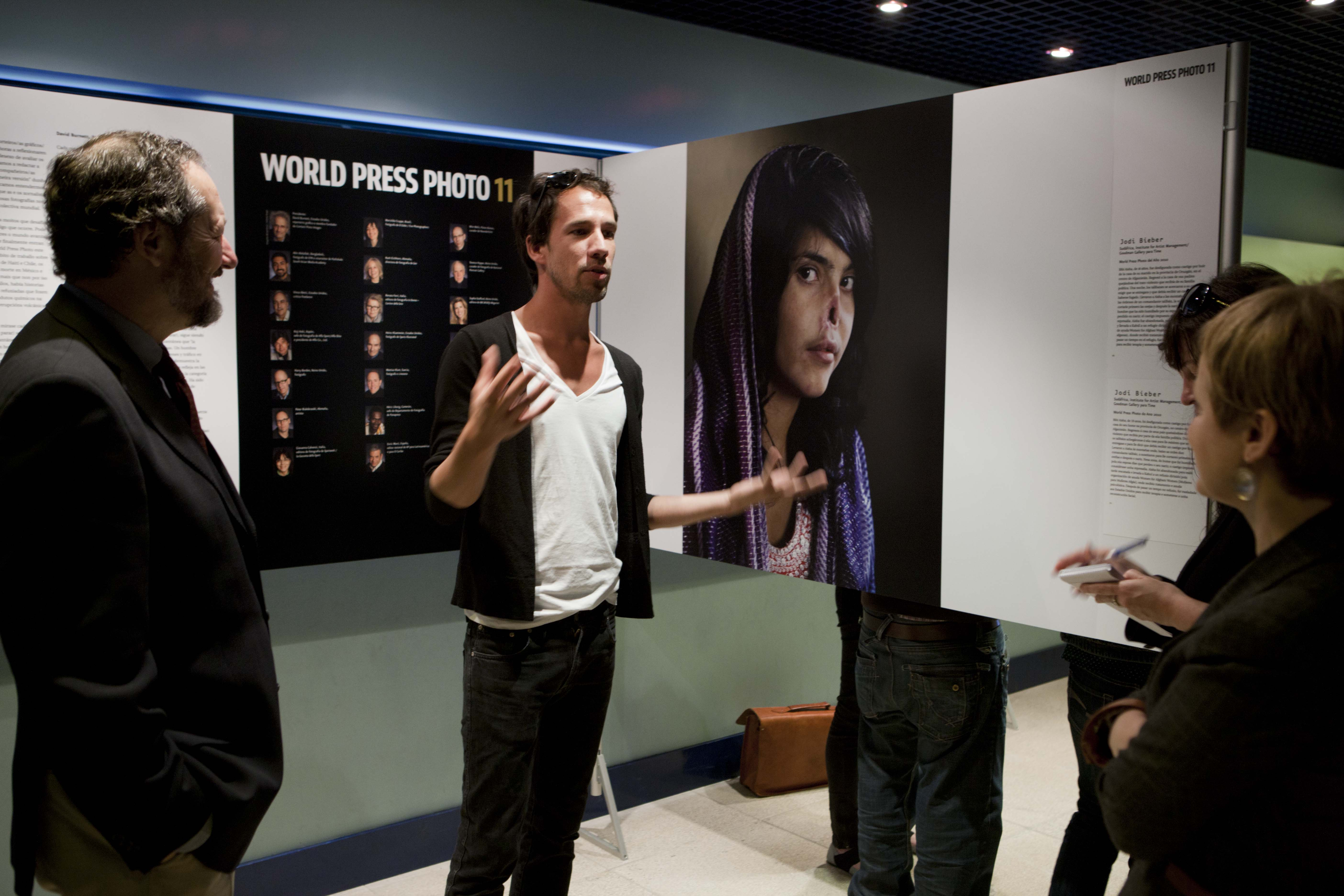
The image of Aisha was shown at a World Press Photo presentation in 2011.

Later, Aisha's psychological condition improved enough that she was able to stop taking medications to control her behavior. Starting in 2012, preparations to do a multistage facial reconstruction for Aisha began. Her forehead was expanded over the course of several months to provide enough tissue to build a new nose. The structure for her new nose was built using cartilage from her own body and tissue from her left hand was also used for the inner lining. Aisha underwent a total of 12 completed surgeries. In 2014 ABC News revisited Aisha and revealed how her new nose has altered her appearance.

Aisha has been adopted by an Afghan-American couple, and, as of 2014, lives in Maryland. She studies English and mathematics and aspires to be a police officer.
