= Elvin Eksioglu =

Turkish film director and producer (born 1966)

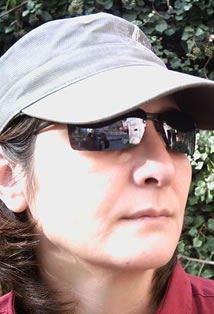
- Elvin Eksioglu July 2011
- Born: September 13, 1966 (age 59); Istanbul, Turkey
- Education: Yıldız Technical University, Photography Department, Marmara University, Cinema and Television Department, Fine Arts Faculty
- Occupations: Film director, producer, screenwriter
- Years active: 1986–present
- Spouse: Abdullah Eksioglu (m. 1993)

Elvin Eksioglu (born September 13, 1966 in Istanbul, Turkey) is a Turkish film director, photographer, screenwriter, and film producer.

== Early life and education ==
Eksioglu graduated from the Photography Department from Yıldız Technical University, and Cinema and Television Department, Fine Arts Faculty from Marmara University.

== Career ==
Eksioglu has worked for Tempo, Aktüel, Cosmopolitan and Oto Haber magazines between 1989 - 1992. She opened her photography exhibition "Kizkulesi'ne Dokunmak" at Maiden's Tower in 1993. She founded news agency Agency Europe & Anatolia with Abdullah Eksioglu in November 1993. She founded Turkey-based international production company Eksantrik Production with Abdullah Eksioglu in 1998. Her book "Sevgiyle Butunlenen Yasam" was published in 1998. Elvin Eksioglu is currently fulfilling her duties as Commercials Director at Eksantrik Production and Editor in Chief at Agency Europe & Anatolia.

== Filmography ==
- 2011: FM 1992 (Documentary)
- 2011: Suya Yazilan Tarih (Documentary)
