= Jodi Bieber =

South African photographer

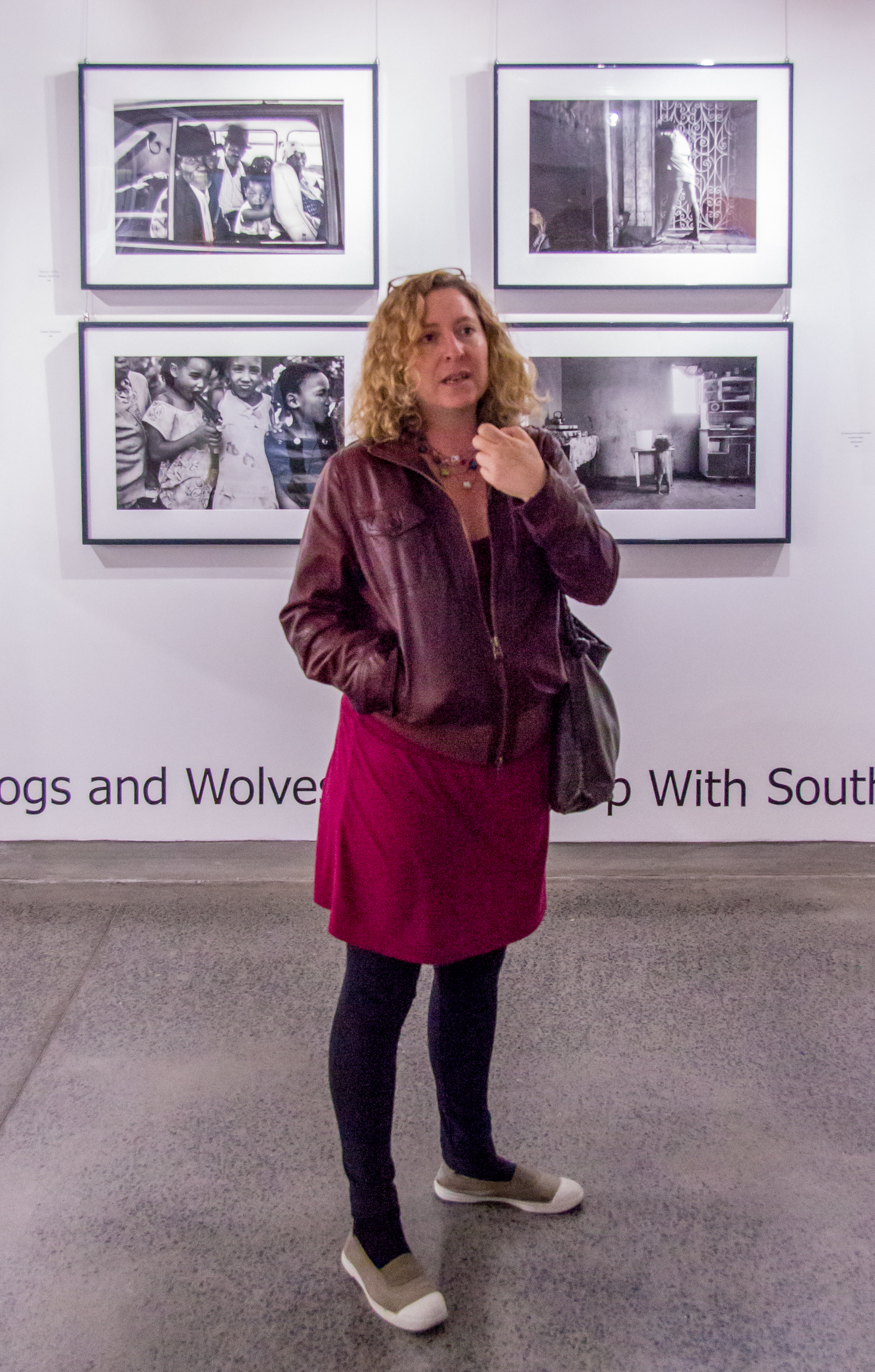
- Jodi Bieber in 2014
- Born: 1966; Johannesburg, South Africa
- Awards: 2010 World Press Photo of the Year
- Website: www.jodibieber.com

Jodi Bieber (born 1966) is a South African photographer. Her photograph of Bibi Aisha, a woman from Afghanistan whose ears and nose were severed by her husband and brother-in-law, was selected as the World Press Photo of the Year in 2010.

== Early life and work ==
Bieber was born in 1966 in Johannesburg. In the early 1990s she attended the Market Photo Workshop and covered the 1994 South African general election, South Africa's first democratic elections, for The Star. She trained under Ken Oosterbroek in 1993 and worked in South Africa until 1996. In 2000 she covered an ebola outbreak in Uganda for The New York Times Magazine.

== Approach to photography ==
Bieber has said that her work is not photojournalism: "I do not aspire to objectivity. I'm simply a photographer. I show what I see and what strikes me, always from my point of view."

== Bibi Aisha ==
Bibi Aisha, then 18, was disfigured after being convicted by the Taliban of taking refuge from a violent husband in her family home. Her story was part of a 2010 Time report into the conditions of Afghan women (see Women's rights in Afghanistan), in conjunction with which Bieber's photo was featured on the magazine's front cover. David Burnett, the chair of the World Press Photo (WPP) jury, said of Bieber's photo of Aisha, "This could become one of those pictures – and we have maybe just ten in our lifetime – where if somebody says, 'You know, that picture of a girl … ', you know exactly which one they're talking about." The Photo of the Year award was Bieber's tenth WPP prize.

Speaking about the photograph, Bieber said "I could have made a photograph with her looking or being portrayed more as the victim. And I thought 'no, this woman is beautiful.'" In a 2014 essay Hilary Janks discussed Bieber's concern for Aisha's beauty and questioned whether "the mutilation [would] have been less reprehensible if Aisha had not been young and beautiful".

== Other work ==
Bieber's book Soweto depicting contemporary scenes from the township of Soweto in Johannesburg, was published in 2010. Bieber described the book as an attempt to counter stereotypes about Soweto and to rectify the absence of representations of post-Apartheid Soweto.

During the lockdown imposed in response to the COVID-19 pandemic in South Africa, Bieber published on Instagram a series of photographs of her husband Francois in various costumes.

== Publications ==
- Between Dogs and Wolves: Growing up with South Africa. Stockport: Dewi Lewis, 1996. ISBN 978-1904587323.
- Soweto. Jacana, 2010. ISBN 978-1770098060. With an introduction by Niq Mhlongo.
- Real Beauty. 2014. Pagina, Goch/Germany, 2014. ISBN 978-3-944146-11-9.
