= Tracy Edser =

South African photojournalist and documentary producer

- Born: Tracy Dyan Edser; South Africa
- Occupation(s): Photo journalist and documentary producer
- Years active: 2008–present
- Known for: Photo Documentaries Amelioration and Window Rwanda

Tracy Edser is a South African photojournalist and documentary producer.

== Biography ==
Tracy Edser is from Johannesburg, South Africa. She trained in a program called "Photojournalism and Documentary Photography" at the Market Photo Workshop. Following this training she was awarded the Tierney Fellowship Grant (2008), to photograph a documentary titled Amelioration. This documentary was exhibited internationally and as a solo exhibition in Johannesburg and won her acclaim. This lead her to get involved with more collaborative assignments.

"Window Rwanda" is a photo documentary project created while volunteering with "Operation Smile", a non profit organization. Edser was moved by the culture and politics of Rwanda, where violence was a common feature in the country's history. During her second visit to Rwanda, and during the team's daily routine of travelling between Kigali and hospitals on the outskirts of the city, she took split-second photographs through the windows of the moving vehicle in which she was traveling. These pictures later became a series published through Damien Poulain for international viewing under the title "Window Rwanda". This series consisted of black and white pictures of villagers engaged in their daily chores, children playing on the road side, women with fruit baskets on their head, and people engaged in group discussions, but there was no accompanying explanatory text. In producing this series she noted:"...what began as an informal technical challenge for myself - composing, exposing and manually focusing at 60km and hour - the exercise became one of removed, sheltered observation and humble appreciation. This was a place that I could not access intimately. I would never be able to name the people I passed or know what they had seen and lived through. The series is one of glances, split-second moments, and I look with warmth at every one of them, because being there was a privilege."

Point of View (POV) Female project established in 2010 Damien Poulain, a London-based graphic designer and art director, selected Edser's photographic series "Window Rwanda" for a group book launch held in Johannesburg in 2013.

Edser is presently teaching at the renowned Johannesburg photographic institution, The Market Photo Workshop.
