= Palazzo Pigorini =

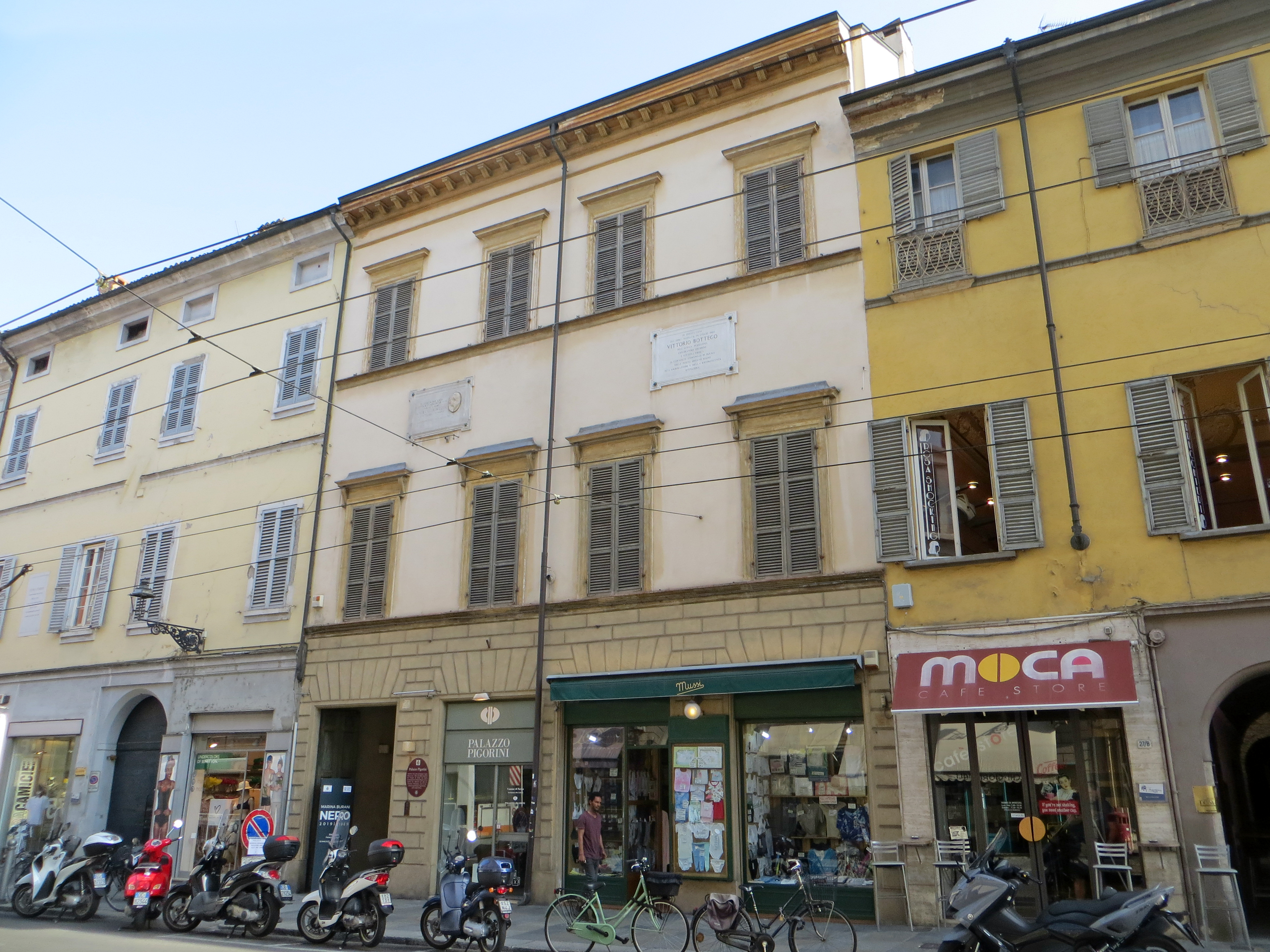
Façade

The Palazzo Pigorini is a small palace located on Strada della Repubblica #46, in central Parma, Italy.

== History ==
The palace as we see it now was mainly erected in 1767, although likely atop an older structure. It is a simple structure with a ground floor of large stone masonry, and simple stuccoed upper stories with four windows. The interior has a courtyard. The guilding is notable for housing in the past both the poet Angelo Mazza and the explorer Vittorio Bottego. In the mid-1800s, the piano nobile was frescoed with depictions of Night and the Apotheosis of the Poet by Francesco Scaramuzza. In the early twentieth century, the palace was acquired by Adriana Pigorini Lusignani, sister of a prominent archeologist, She left the building to the Commune of Parma, for use as a museum.

The building was refurbished by Maurizio Bocchi, and is now used for exhibitions since 1996.
