= Timeline of women in photography =

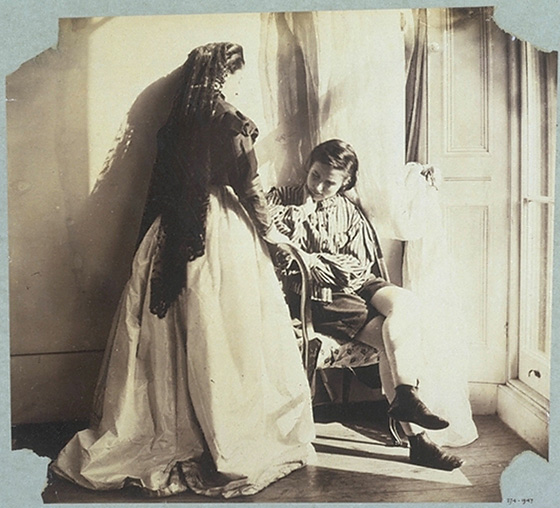
Clementina Maude and Isabella taken by their mother Lady Clementina Hawarden c.1861

This is a timeline of women in photography tracing the major contributions women have made to both the development of photography and the outstanding photographs they have created over the 19th, 20th and 21st centuries.

== Early 19th-century pioneers ==
=== 1839 ===
- (United Kingdom) Sarah Anne Bright (1793–1866) produces what is possibly the earliest surviving photographic image taken by a woman.
- (United Kingdom) Constance Fox Talbot (1811–1880), wife of the inventor Henry Fox Talbot, experiments with the process of photography, possibly becoming the first woman to take a photograph.

=== 1842 ===
- Franziska Möllinger (1817–1880) becomes the first female photographer in Switzerland, taking daguerreotypes of Swiss scenes which she publishes as lithographs in 1844.

=== 1843 ===
- (United Kingdom) Anna Atkins (1799–1871), also a friend of Henry Fox Talbot, publishes Photographs of British Algae: Cyanotype Impressions, the first book with photographic illustrations.
- (Germany) Bertha Beckmann (1815–1901), opens a studio with her husband in Leipzig, running the business herself from his death in 1847.

=== 1844 ===
- Jessie Mann (1805–1867) takes a photograph of the King of Saxony, probably becoming the first woman photographer in Scotland.

=== 1845 ===
- (Sweden) Brita Sofia Hesselius (1801–1866) makes daguerreotypes in her photographic studio in Karlstad, moving her studio to Stockholm in 1857.

=== 1847 ===
- (France) Geneviève Élisabeth Disdéri (c.1817–1878) assists her husband André-Adolphe-Eugène Disdéri in their Brest studio, later operating the business alone.
- (Mexico) Epifania de Guadalupe Vallejo (1835–1905) makes a daguerreotype portrait of her mother, Francisca Benicia Carrillo de Vallejo. Fannie Vallejo is the earliest known photographer in what was soon to become the state of California. Since she was only 12 years old, it is unlikely that she could have mastered the daguerreotype process on her own, but how she learned it and who taught her are unknown.

=== 1848 ===
- (United States) Sarah Louise Judd (1802–c.1881) makes daguerreotypes in spring 1848, continuing for two years in Stillwater, Minnesota.

=== 1849 ===
- (Canada) Elise L'Heureux (1827–1896), together with her husband, sets up a daguerreotype studio in Quebec City, taking over the business in 1865.
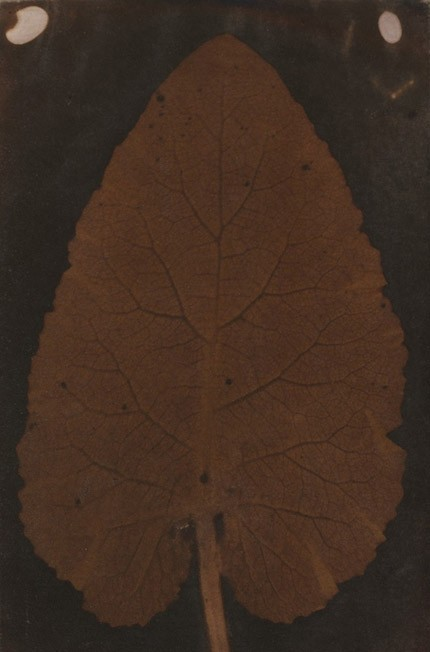
Sarah Anne Bright's Quillan Leaf (1839)

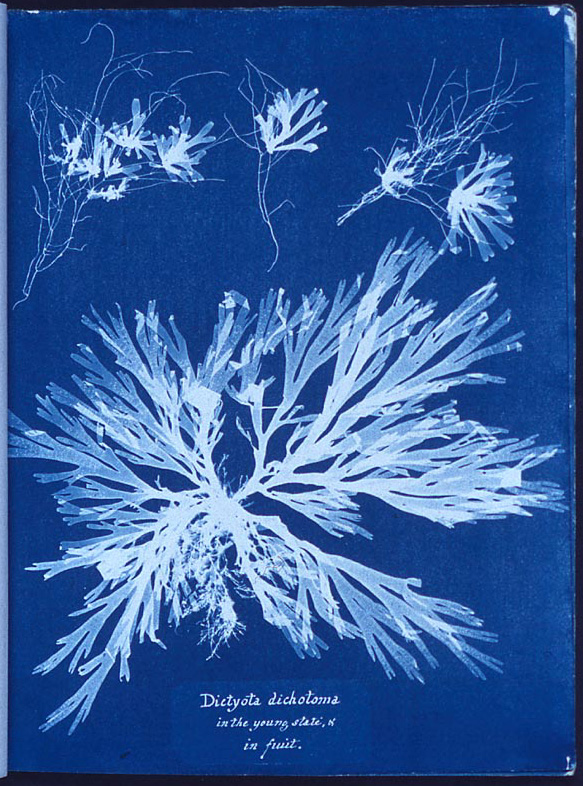
Anna Atkins' photogram of Algae (1843)

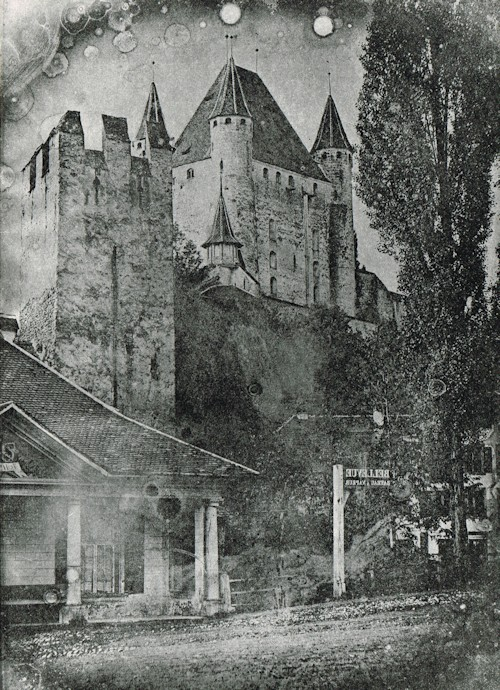
Franziska Möllinger's daguerreotype of Thun Castle (c.1844)

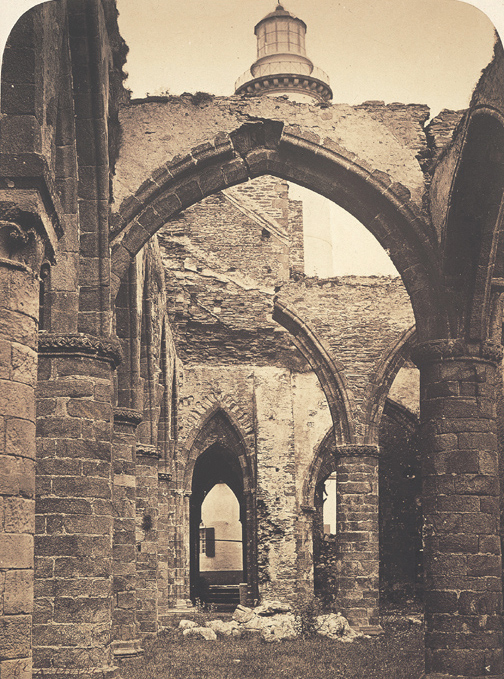
Geneviève Élisabeth Disdéri's Interior of St Mathieu (1869)

== Later 19th century ==
=== 1850 ===
- (United States) Julia Shannon (c. 1812 – c. 1852), the first known professional woman photographer in California, advertises her work with daguerreotypes in 1850.
- (Denmark) Thora Hallager (1821–1884) begins making daguerreotypes in Copenhagen, opening her own studio around 1857.

=== 1852 ===
- (Germany) Emilie Bieber (1810–1884) opens a daguerreotype studio in Hamburg.
- (Sweden) Marie Kinnberg opens a daguerreotype studio in Gothenburg.

=== 1853 ===
- (Wales) (United Kingdom) Mary Dillwyn (1816–1906) took the first known photograph of a snowman, circa 1853.

=== 1854 ===
- (United Kingdom) Caroline Emily Nevill (1829–1887) and her sisters Henrietta (1830–1912) and Isabel (1831–1915) exhibit at the London Photographic Society.

=== 1855 ===
- (France) Madame Vaudé-Green opened a photography studio in Paris, called Photographie catholique, specialising in photographs of religious painting.

=== 1856 ===
- (Italy) Virginia Oldoini (1837–1899) began taking photographs, mainly of herself in theatrical costumes.
- (United States) Julia Ann Rudolph (also known as Julia Ann Swift and Julia Ann Raymond; c. 1820–1890) sets up her own photography studio in Nevada City, California.

=== 1857 ===
- (United Kingdom) Lady Clementina Hawarden (1822–1865) begins photographing in Ireland, later setting up her own private studio in London where she produced some 800 albumen prints.

=== 1863 ===
- Emma Kirchner (1830 – 1909) sets up as the first woman photographer in her studio in Delft, Netherlands.

=== 1864 ===
- (United Kingdom) Julia Margaret Cameron (1815–1879) begins taking photographs, becoming famous for her portraits of celebrities.
- (Denmark) Louise Thomsen (1823–1907) establishes a business in Hellebæk near Helsingør.

=== 1867 ===
- (New Zealand) Elizabeth Pulman (1836–1900) assists her husband in his Auckland studio, taking over the business on his death in 1871.

=== 1869 ===
- (Denmark) Thora Hallager photographs Hans Christian Andersen.

=== 1871 ===
- Adelaide Conroy was operating from 56, Strada Stretta, Valletta, Malta, until mid 1879 specialising mostly in carte de visite and albumen print.

=== 1876 ===
- Frederikke Federspiel (1839–1913) is the first woman in Denmark to obtain a licence to trade in photography.

=== 1880s ===
- (United States) Mollie Fly (1847–1925) ran a photo studio from the 1880s to the early 1910s in Tombstone, Arizona.

=== 1881 ===
- Geraldine Moodie (1854–1945) establishes a studio in Battleford, Saskatchewan. She was later commissioned to create photographic records of western Canada.

=== 1888 ===
- Mary Steen (1856–1939) becomes Denmark's first female court photographer.

=== 1890 ===
- (United States) Sarah J. Eddy (1851–1945) begins exhibiting photographs. Her most important exhibitions were at the New School of American Photography and the selection of American Women photographers at the Paris Universal Exposition of 1900.

=== 1891 ===
- (United States) Lina Jonn (1861–1896) opened her photographic studio in Lund, Sweden, in 1891. When she retired on marriage, she handed over the studio and brand name to her sister Maria Jonn, who had trained with her and who built their brand into a flourishing business.

=== 1892 ===
- (United States) Edith Watson (1861–1943) begins her career as a travelling photographer; her work, spanning the 1890s to the 1930s, is noted for photojournalistic images of rural life and working women in Canada.

=== 1894 ===
- (United States) Frances Benjamin Johnston (1864–1952) becomes the first woman to open a studio in Washington, D.C.

=== 1895 ===
- (Denmark) Julie Laurberg (1856–1925) opens a large successful photography business in Copenhagen's Magasin du Nord where she would employ many women. She supported women's professional participation in photography.

=== 1896 ===
- (Australia) Harriett Brims (1864–1939) opens a studio in Ingham, Queensland, working as a professional photographer for 16 years.

=== 1899 ===
- (United States) Laura Adams Armer becomes active as a photographer in San Francisco photographing Chinatown and other areas of interest.
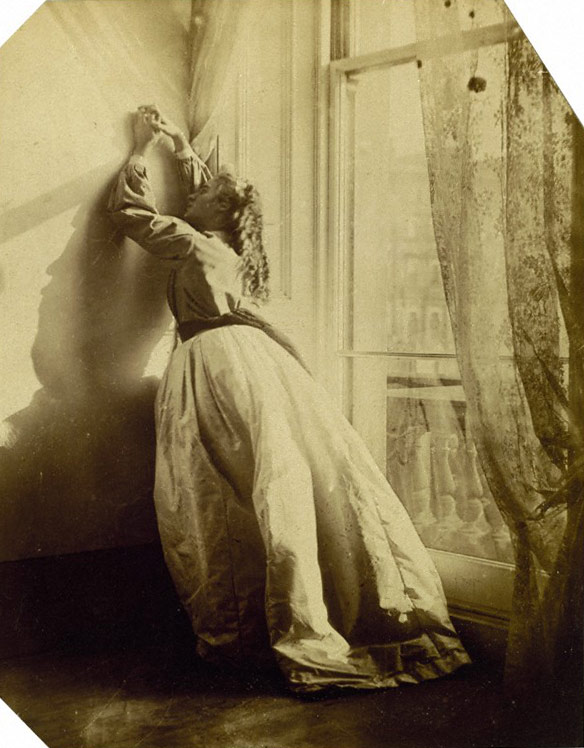
Viscountess Hawarden's daughter Clementina Maude (1863)

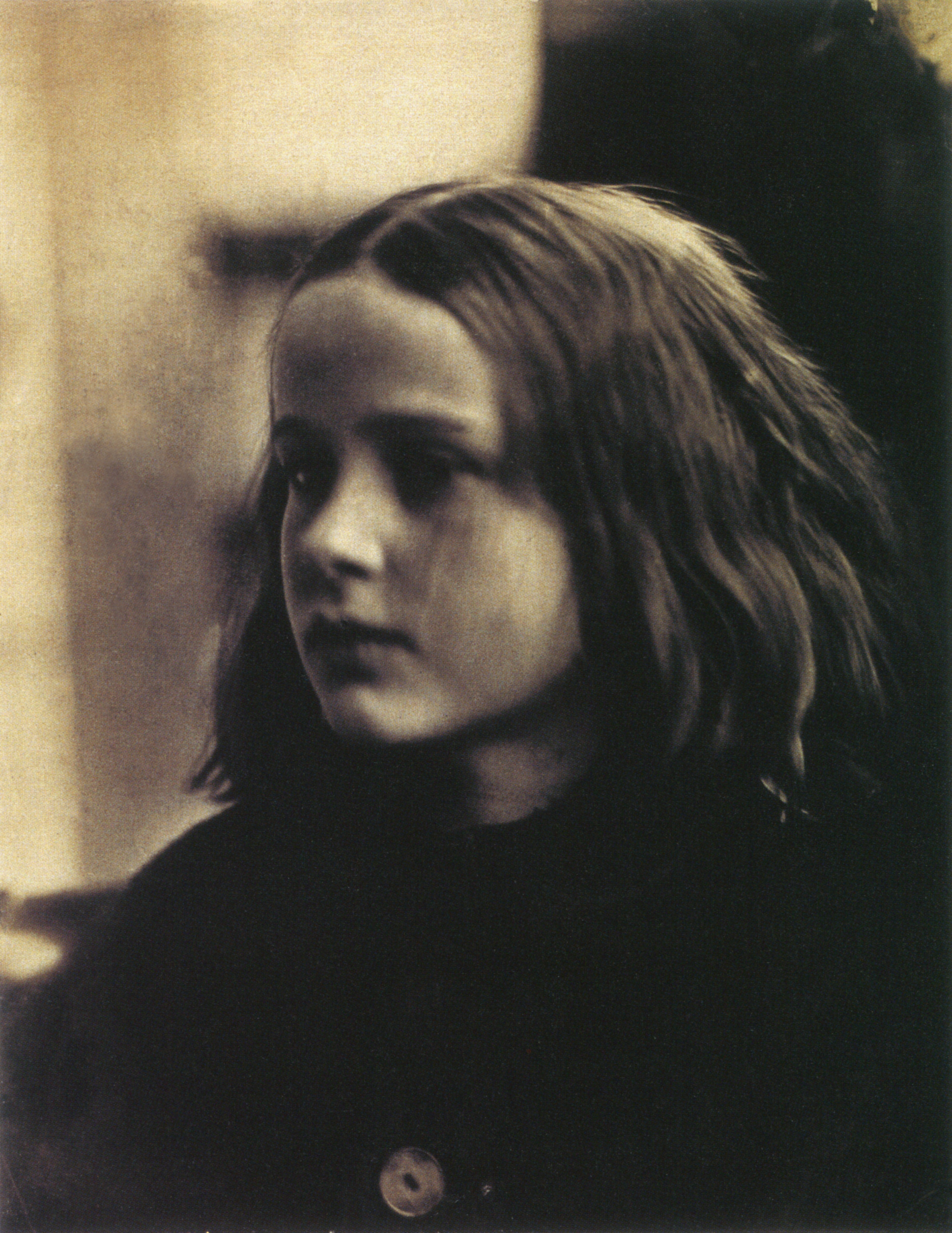
Julia Margaret Cameron's portrait of her daughter Annie (1864)

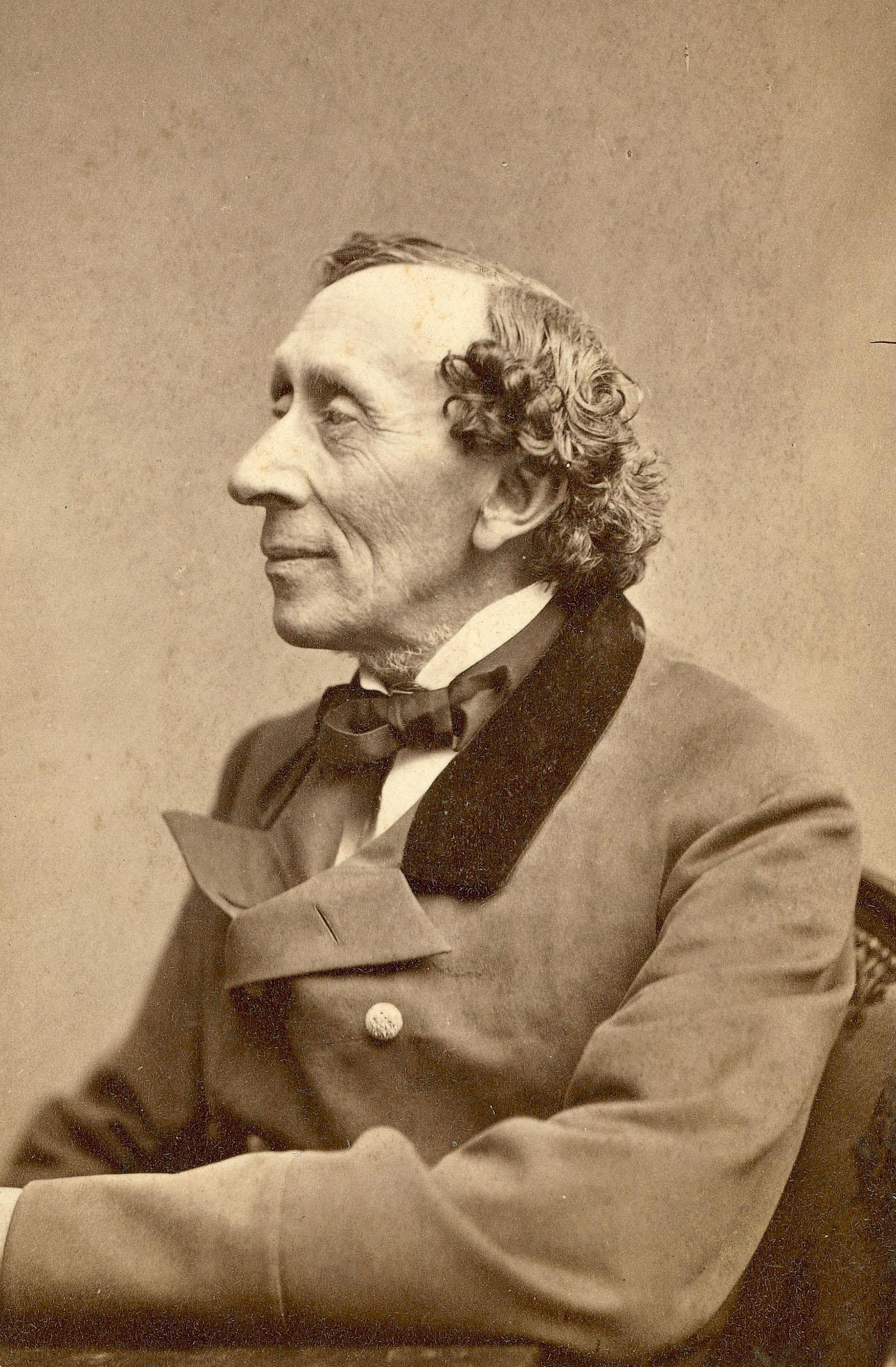
Thora Hallager's portrait of Hans Christian Andersen (1869)

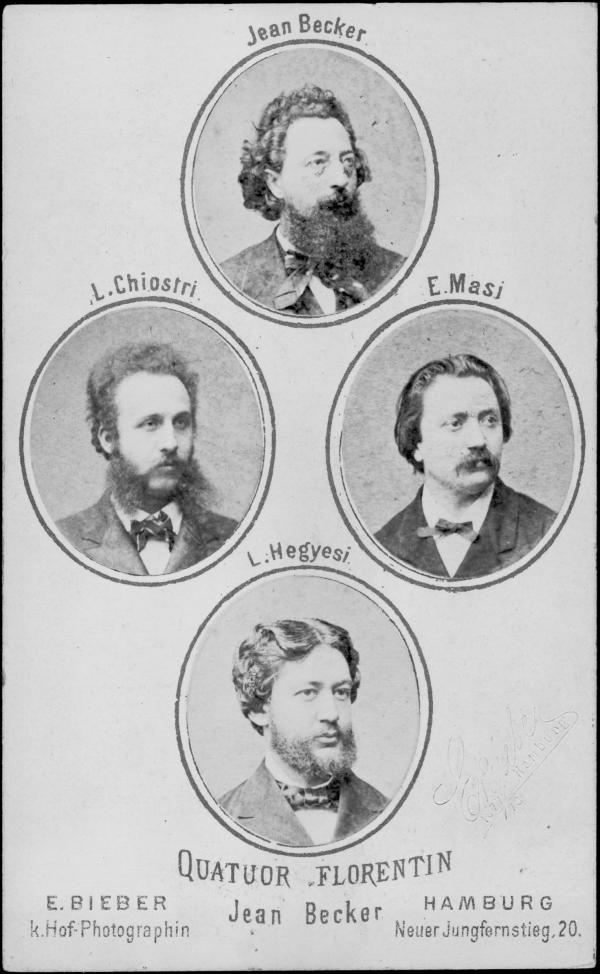
Emilie Bieber's Quatuor Florentin (c.1875)

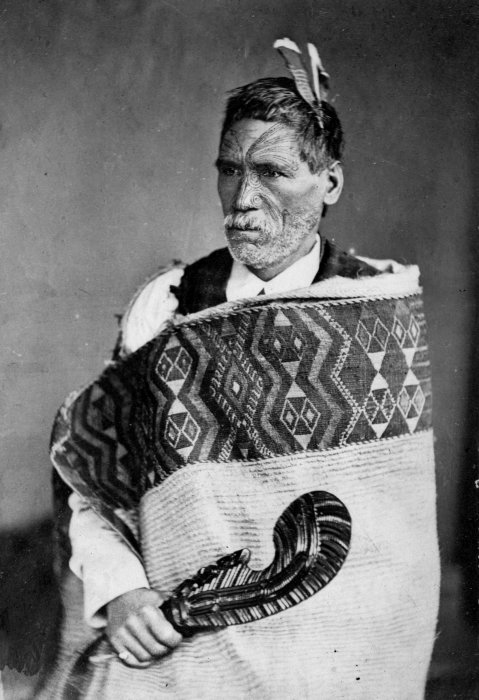
Elizabeth Pulman's portrait of Rewi Manga Maniapoto (1879)

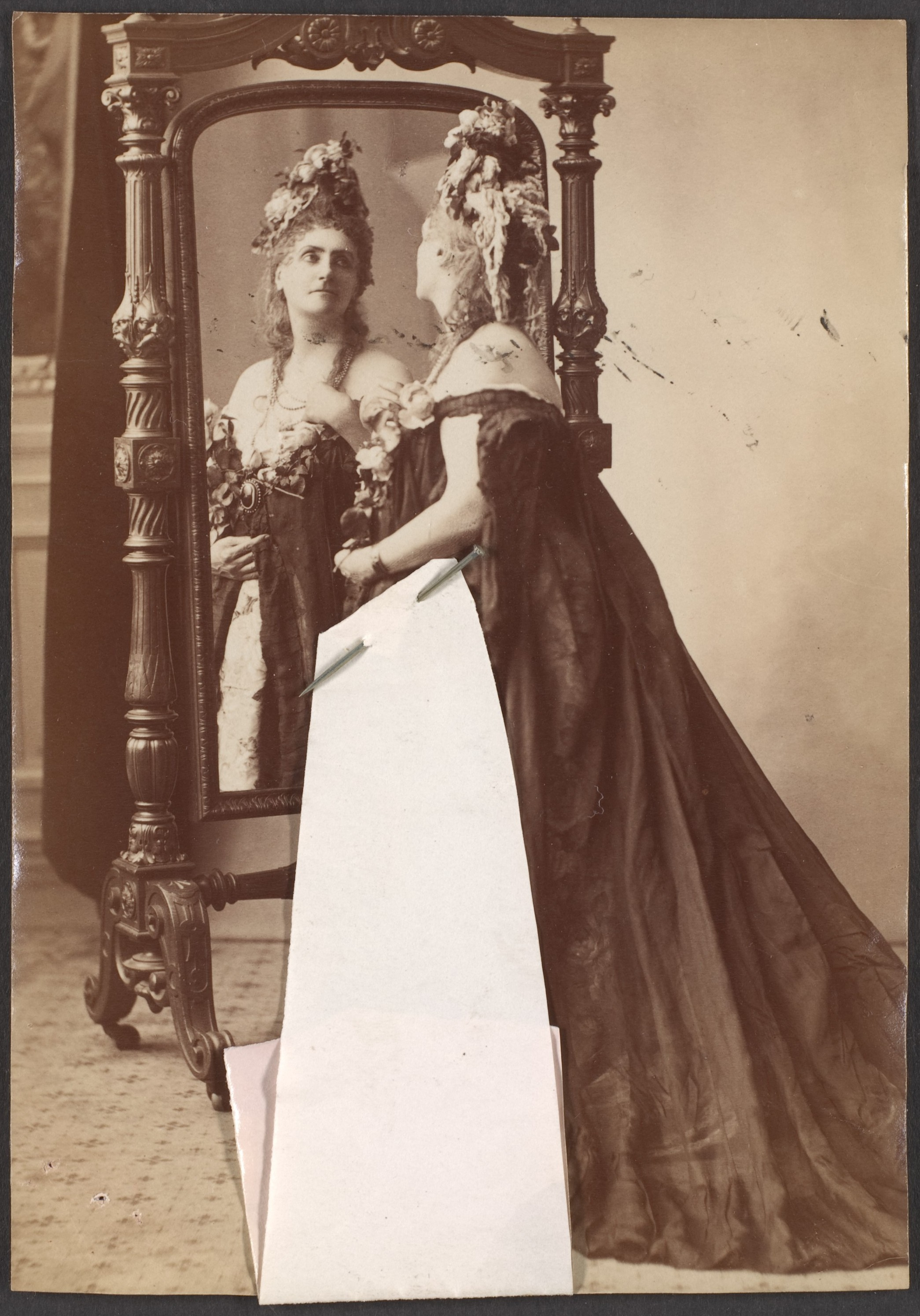
Virginia Oldoini, Countess of Castiglione self portrait (1895)

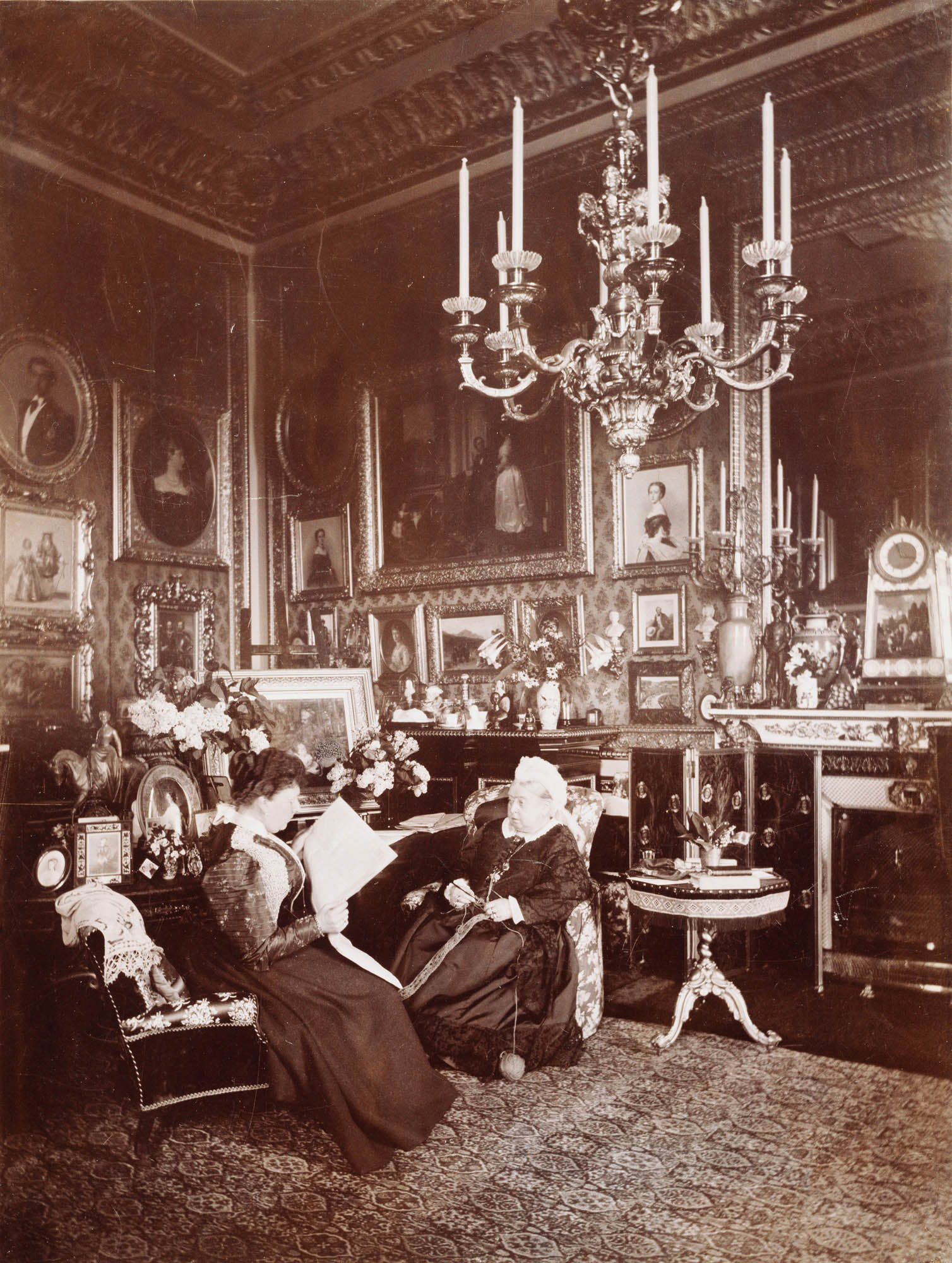
Mary Steen's photograph of Queen Victoria and Princess Beatrice (1895)

== Early 20th century ==
=== 1900 ===
- (United States) Gertrude Käsebier (1852–1934) sold prints of her 1899 photograph "The Manger" (a portrait of fellow photographer Frances W. Delehanty) for $100, "the highest price ever paid for a photograph" to that time.

=== 1901 ===
- (United States) Ladies' Home Journal featured a series of articles, "The Foremost Women Photographers in America", edited by Frances Benjamin Johnston and including Gertrude Käsebier (May), Mathilde Weil (June), The Allen Sisters (July), Emma J. Farnsworth (August), Eva Watson-Schütze (October), Zaida Ben-Yusuf (November), and Elizabeth Brownell (January 1902).

=== 1903 ===
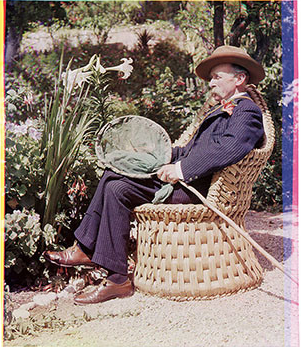
Col. Willoughby Verner, 1903 photograph by Acland

- (United Kingdom) Sarah Acland is taking colour photos whilst on holiday in Gibraltar.
- (United Kingdom) Christina Broom (1862–1939) starts selling photographs as postcards, later becoming the first female press photographer.

=== 1904 ===
- (France) Céline Laguarde's works Stella, Étude en brun and Pierrette were printed in L'Épreuve photographique, the only woman to appear in the publication, a significant element of the Pictorialist's ouvre.

=== 1906 ===
- (Finland) Signe Brander (1869–1942) is charged by the City of Helsinki to document photographically the changing face of the city.

=== 1907 ===
- (Austria) Dora Kallmus (1881–1963) establishes a fashion studio in Vienna, later creating portraits of celebrities.

=== 1909 ===
- (United States) The Women's Federation of the Photographers Association of America holds its organizational meeting in Rochester, New York, with Mary Carnell as its first president.

=== 1913 ===
- (Canada) Margaret Watkins (1884–1969) works as an assistant in a Boston studio, opening her own business in New York City in 1920.

=== 1915 ===
- (United States) Katherine Russell Bleecker (1893–1996) makes three films about prison reform this year, using her own cameras. She is sometimes credited as the first professional camerawoman in American film.

=== 1916 ===
- (Austria) Trude Fleischmann (1895–1990) embarks on her career as a professional photographer, creating outstanding portraits of intellectuals and artists.

=== 1917 ===
- Naciye Suman (1881–1973) creates a studio in Istanbul, becoming Turkey's first female photographer.

=== 1920s ===
- (Lebanon) Marie al-Khazen (1899–1983) was a Lebanese photographer active in the 1920s; the photographs she created are considered to constitute a valuable and unique record of their time and place.
- (United States) Elise Forrest Harleston (February 8, 1891 – 1970) was an early African-American photographer who set up a studio in Charleston, South Carolina, in 1922 that lasted into the early 1930s.
- (United States) Ruth Matilda Anderson (1893 – 1983), a graduate of the Clarence H. White School of Photography, starts taking more than 14.000 documentary photographs of rural life in early 20th-century Spain for the Hispanic Society of America. Her work has found appreciation after her death in exhibitions and catalogs.

=== 1925 ===
- (United States) Ruth Harriet Louise (1903–1940) is hired by Metro-Goldwyn-Mayer to run their portrait studio, becoming the first female photographer to be active in Hollywood.

=== 1928 ===
- (United States) Margaret Bourke-White (1904–1971) opens a studio in Cleveland, Ohio, becoming a photojournalist in 1929.

=== 1932 ===
- (Hungary) Ylla (1911–1955) begins photographing animals, later becoming recognized as the world's most proficient animal photographer.

=== 1936 ===
- (Germany) Ilse Bing (1899–1998) creates monochrome images which are exhibited at the Louvre and New York's Museum of Modern Art.
- (Germany) Gerda Taro (1910–1937) is killed while covering the Spanish Civil War, becoming the first woman photojournalist to have died while working on the frontline.

=== 1939 ===
- Homai Vyarawalla begins contributing to The Illustrated Weekly of India, developing a career as India's first female press photographer.
- (United States) Berenice Abbott publishes her work of bird's eye and worm's eye view photographs of New York City in Changing New York.

=== 1940s ===
- Tsuneko Sasamoto (1914–2022) joined the Japanese Photographic Society in 1940, becoming Japan's first female photojournalist.
- (United States) Carlotta Corpron (December 9, 1901 – April 17, 1988) begins making the "light drawings" that establish her as a pioneer of American abstract photography.

=== 1941 ===
- (United States) Margaret Bourke-White (1904–1971) becomes the first female war correspondent.
- (United States) Dorothea Lange (1895–1965) is awarded a Guggenheim Fellowship.

=== 1945 ===
- (United States) Marion Carpenter (1920–2002) becomes a White House photographer, frequently travelling with President Truman.

== Late 20th century ==
=== 1950 ===
- (United States) Thousands of striking 19th-century photographs made by Staten Island photographer Alice Austen (1866-1952) are rediscovered and published.

=== 1954 ===
- (United States) Virginia Schau (1915–1989) becomes the first woman to win the Pulitzer Prize for Photography.

=== 1962 ===
- (France) Agnès Varda (1928–2019) releases her French New Wave film Cléo from 5 to 7.

=== 1967 ===
- (Poland) Polish-born Rose Mandel (1910–2002), senior photographer in the art department at the University of California, is awarded a Guggenheim Fellowship.

=== 1972 ===
- (Belgium) Belgian-born Liliane de Cock (1939–2013), photographic assistant to Ansel Adams from 1963 to 1972, is awarded a Guggenheim Fellowship.
- Lorraine Monk (1922–2020) is honoured as an Officer of the Order of Canada for her contributions to photography.

=== 1973 ===
- (Argentina) Sara Facio and María Cristina Orive co-found La Azotea, the first publishing house in Latin America dedicated to photography.

=== 1974 ===
- (Italy) Letizia Battaglia begins her career photographing the Sicilian Mafia.

=== 1976 ===
- (United States) Nan Goldin (born 1953) is an American photographer and activist. Her work explores the emotions of the individual in intimate relationships and bohemian LGBTQ+ communities, especially those affected by the devastating HIV/AIDS crisis of the 1980s.

=== 1978 ===
- (Mexico) Graciela Iturbide (born 1942) becomes one of the founding members of the Mexican Council of Photography.

=== 1979 ===
- (Argentina) Sara Facio, Alicia D'Amico, Annemarie Heinrich, and Maria Cristina Orive are all part of the group of original founders of the Consejo Argentino de Fotografía.

=== 1980 ===
- (United States) Jane Evelyn Atwood receives the first W. Eugene Smith Grant for humanistic photography for her project on the lives of blind children.

=== 1991 ===
- (United States) Annie Leibovitz becomes the first woman to hold an exhibition at Washington's National Portrait Gallery.

== 21st century ==
=== 2005 ===
- (Germany) Anja Niedringhaus (1965–2014) wins the Pulitzer Prize for Breaking News Photography for her coverage of the Iraq War.
- (United States) Bearing Witness, a documentary for American television, follows five women war journalists working in Iraq, including photographer Molly Bingham and camerawoman Mary Rogers.

=== 2010 ===
- Raymonde April (born 1953) is awarded the Order of Canada for her contribution to photography.

== See also ==
- List of women photographers
- Women photographers
