= Alicia D'Amico =

Argentine photographer (1933–2001)

- Born: October 6, 1933; Buenos Aires, Argentina
- Died: August 30, 2001 (aged 67); Buenos Aires, Argentina
- Occupation: Photographer

Alicia D'Amico (October 6, 1933 – August 30, 2001) was an Argentine photographer. She was born in Buenos Aires, where her family had a photographic business. She ran a very productive studio with Sara Facio for twenty years. She published photography books and for the last twenty years of her life she focused on feminist issues and personal projects about the role of women in photography. She dedicated her entire life to photography, and she became a leading figure in Argentine photography.

== Early life ==
Alicia D'Amico was born on October 6, 1933, in Buenos Aires. Her father, Luis D’Amico, was a local photographer and managed the family business, a store named “Foto-Arte D’Amico” in Buenos Aires. In this establishment there were two parts, a counter for the general public and a workshop, darkroom and gallery which was attached to the family house. There, D’Amico grew up between photography equipment, while she attended school and took painting and music lessons. When she was thirteen years old, she was accepted into the Escuela de Bellas Artes “Manuel Belgrano". There she was trained artistically and started to discover Argentine cultural life in addition to more international views. These new ideas were far from the creative process that her father used in his photography, which was purely commercial and with bureaucratic purposes. This was not the way of expression that Alicia D’Amico was searching for.

Her father had worked for the improvement of the labour union of photographers. He was one of the founders of the Sociedad de Fotógrafos Profesionales Establecidos, and he had participated in the first cooperative group of professional photographers. Alicia D’Amico admired him for that, but it wasn't enough to link her to the family business of photography.

== Career ==
=== Beginnings ===
In 1953 D’Amico graduated from the Escuela Nacional as a Profesora Nacional de Dibujo y Pintura. She met Sara Facio when both of them were studying and became very close friends. In 1955, the two of them took a trip to Europe which lasted a year and a half. They were able to afford it because the French government granted them a scholarship to study in Paris. From Paris, they traveled to Germany, Spain and England. In Paris, the project which they had to develop for the scholarship was to make an art history book. This motivated the two friends to visit every museum, gallery, art centre, and theatre that they could. During their stay in Paris, one day they met a man who, at the moment realised that they were Argentine and proposed them to participate in El Hogar, which was a very relevant magazine of the moment. They worked in a few articles which were published in the 1955 issue.

In Germany D’Amico discovered a new approach to photography, different from the one developed by her father. There she bought her first camera, an Agfa Super Silette 35 mm. Back in her home, she and Facio started to study photography with her father, but a short while after, he died. Alicia D’Amico took charge of the family business the two next years, but then she decided to close the studio.

=== Collaboration with Sara Facio: 1960–1983 ===
In March 1960, D’Amico travelled to the United States, where she attended a course of colour photography held by Kodak in Rochester, New York. Because of it, she was offered to open a studio of colour photography in Buenos Aires, but she declined the offer. Back in Buenos Aires, during this same year, she opened along with Facio a photography studio, “Sara Facio Alicia D’Amico Fotografías”.

From the beginning, they were very selective with the works they chose, the projects had to be stimulating for the two of them. In New York, D’Amico had learned the US method of work, which consisted of working non-stop from 11 am to 7 pm. As Sara Facio wrote “No madrugar y no almorzar, dos principios para mantenerse “en forma”” (Not getting up early and not stopping for lunch, two principles to “stay in shape”). In a short space of time, the studio started to receive its first clients among which there were intellectuals and artists. Thanks to that, the two young photographers discovered the journalism and advertising world of the time. D’Amico also joined the Foto Club Buenos Aires in 1960.

At the Foto Club, the photographers took part of competitions which allowed them to climb positions inside the hierarchy of the club. She won the second place in her first competition, and from then on, she rose up until she reached the upper category. At that point, she didn't participate in more competitions, because they didn't mean nothing new or stimulating to her. She was designated as the Secretary of the Executive Commission and Secretary of the monthly competitions, and she founded the photography library of the club.

"From my beginnings I remember with gratitude the advices from two colleagues: Annemarie Heinrich and Boleslao Senderowicz. (...) I owe to Senderowicz invaluable advices. Because of his huge professional experience in publicity he taught me to never understimate my work, to never sell it to the best -or the worst- bidder; to accept only the works which provide me personal satisfaction. I have followed his instructions since the very first day and I am not sorry for that, although I spent weeks with my arms crossed. Maybe this is the basis to organize this profession hierarchically and not feel like a slave of money. In one word: be free."

— Alicia D’Amico

The D’Amico and Facio studio worked for twenty-three years, until 1983. They took portraits, but in an artistic way and also worked for the advertising world, and their shots (took without any previous sketch) were for national and international newspapers. They made audiovisual aids for television or private companies and still photographs from movies.

A cultural atmosphere was created in the studio, they made intellectual meetings where the most important figures of the Argentine culture were gathered. D’Amico and Facio made up a very important photographic library.

Every shot they took in the studio was signed by the two of them, without distinguish who really shot each photography. In Facio's words: “When it was time to choose, we always selected the best photo. It would be mine or hers. One day she was inspired, and the next one, I was. And we signed with both our names.” In 1982 they were awarded with the Premio Konex jointly.

=== The 1970s ===
In 1973, both photographers along to María Cristina Orive founded La Azotea, the first photographic editorial in Latin America. Since then, they started to publish works made by Latin-American authors, to increase their distribution and recognition among society.

The Consejo Argentino de Fotografía (CAF) was created in 1979 and Alicia D’Amico was part of the founding members. The CAF had the purpose of spreading Argentine photography and provided photographers with different types of training. Alicia D’Amico's photographs were shown at the first exhibition made by the CAF, at Gallery Praxis in 1980. Inside the council, D’Amico along to Sara Facio were responsible for the circulation and distribution of the Works among press and society.

Inside the CAF, they had some objectives such as focus on the distribution of Argentine photographers' works and in the historical research. They were not interested in made one image more superior than the others, like in the competitions organised by the Foto Clubs and other institutions. They wanted to uplift the importance of the authors, and in their works as a whole, because showing only one photograph was not representative.

=== The 1980s–1990s ===
In 1969 Alicia D’Amico had participated in the foundation of the Unión Feminista Argentina (UFA) accompanied by other intellectual women like María Luisa Bemberg, Leonor Calvera, Marta Migueles or Hilda Rais. Together with other feminist groups like Movimiento de Liberación Femenina (MLF), they started to create feminist debates, study groups where they read feminist texts and many awareness work to the general public. This organisations developed during the 1970 decade, until the coup d’état of 1976.

Some years later, in October 1982, Derechos Iguales para la Mujer Argentina (DIMA) held the First Argentine Congress La mujer en el Mundo de Hoy, and in 1983 the Jornadas de la Creatividad Femenina and a Second Argentine Congress La mujer en el Mundo de Hoy, among others. This series of activities made easier the gathering of the previous feminist groups and they were able to continue their work. Coinciding with the celebration of this feminist activities, Alicia D’Amico started a project that lasted until the date of her death in 2001, her series of works Creación de la propia imagen. This concept started in the First Argentine Congress La mujer en el Mundo de Hoy, where the Argentine photographer took photos of the women that attended the congress, and she let them pose however they wanted to, the importance of the photo was to capture the essence, the sensibility of each person.

In August 1983, Lugar de Mujer was created and among its founders were Alicia D’Amico. In this place they held different cultural activities, study groups, information chats and awareness sessions. It was a very stimulating place for feminist art, because a lot of its participants were artists, like Alicia D’Amico herself. In Lugar de Mujer, continuing with the idea of Creación de la propia imagen, D’Amico made with the psychologist Graciela Sykos a workshop called Autorretrato, where the participants were able to transform the imagen of women, a new image of women by women, through photography. Part of this works were published in the third issue of the Argentine newspaper, Alfonsina, in 1984. This workshops were repeated in time and them allowed Alicia D’Amico to portrayed a lot of different women.

Later, she worked with another psychologist, Liliana Mizrahi, in a project which was between photography and performance, called Pies desnudos (1985). The main objective of it was different from the one in Autorretrato workshops. In this series of photographs, Alicia D’Amico was searching for a legitimate representation of the desire between women. She worked on make lesbianism visible by using visual representation. By making a visual imaginary of desire between women she was contributing to give visibility to it. She continued with her main genre, the portrait, to represent women couples. This couples were real couples, and D’Amico only capture the photos without them posing, because the artist didn't want to lose the authenticity or the tenderness.

In the 1990 decade, she developed this topic with a personal and inevitably political vision, by making another workshops, as the one made in Las lunas y las otras in 1994, called Dar el cuerpo o dar la cara, which one was repeated one years later in IV Encuentro de Lesbianas Feministas de América Latina y el Caribe, in Mar de Plata.

== Style ==
Due to her training in the Escuela de Bellas Artes, D’Amico always create very clear and equilibrated compositions. She had a predilection for the black and white, which provided her photographs with a special expression. The portrait was her main genre, because portraying people was always her passion. In spite of the fact that some of her first photographs, which were taken for the Foto Club competitions, consisted on very academic compositions, Alicia D’Amico always broke the rules and used her own vision. Despite that, her success was inevitable because professionalism and her excellent technique.

"If I had to name my influences I have to refer myself to another countries. [...] Since the first moment, I felt influenced and attracted to the regular photography (not the "artistic" one) but elaborated. Elaborated in the decision of reality, elaborated in that "second gaze" which the photographer makes before the shot. The elaboration still invisible which we see before shooting. When we make the framing and we feel that the photo is the one and not another. [...] I saw "the photo" for the first time in the works of Edward Stieglitz, in the Spanish Village of Eugene Smith, and in every shot of Cartier-Bresson. I know that, since the start, my photographs had a rigour of composition that could remember to other masters, but i formed my competitive basis in my time in the National Academy of Fine Arts. Photographically talking, I feel the daughter of the ones I mentioned and not of others."

— Alicia D'Amico

== Publications ==
Between 1965 and 1967 she worked on a shot series which unified in her first book, Buenos Aires, Buenos Aires, published in 1968 which was a huge success. It didn't consist of a book with panoramic views of the city and beautiful landscapes, with no subjects in them. The importance wasn't the architecture nor the urbanism. The real protagonist of the photographs were the people of Buenos Aires, and how they moved through the streets. Julio Cortázar wrote the introduction.

Her portrait passion was crystallised in the book Retratos y Autorretratos, published in 1973. It contains numerous portraits of intellectuals, writers, people of the Latin American cultural life. The portraits which were presented in that book were simply expressive, D’Amico and Facio looked for the form of capture the pathology of the characters by using cut shots and very strong close-ups. Every photo was captured naturally, the person who was being portrayed was never posing.

Apart from this two examples, Alicia D'Amico had other photographic books published, such as:

- Geografía de Pablo Neruda (1973)
- Humanario (1976)
- Cómo tomar fotografías (1977).

== Exhibitions ==
- 1963: Riobóo Gallery, Buenos Aires
- 1964: Lirolay Gallery
- 1964: National Library of México
- 1980: Museo Histórico Nacional (Buenos Aires); CAF Exhibition, Galería Praxis, Buenos Aires
- 1981: Agathe Gaillard Gallery, París; Museo de Arte Moderno de São Paulo; Kuntshaus Zürich; Tuskada Gallery, Tokyo; Museo de Arte Moderno de Buenos Aires; Museo de Arte Contemporáneo, Mar del Plata
- 1982: Reggia di Casserta; Galleria San Fedele, Milan
- 1983: IIº Encuentro Feminista Latinoamericano y del Caribe, Lima.
- 1984: Universitá degli Studi di Genova; Museo de Arte Moderno de Bogotá/ Galerie Municipale du Château d’Eau, Toulouse
- 1985: El Barberillo. Madrid
- 1986: Casa Argentina in Rome
- 1987: Kunsthalle Hamburg
- 1989: Wellesley College, Boston
- 1992: FotoFest, Houston / Centre Pompidou, París
- 2002: Museo Sivori; Prilidiano Pueyrredón Art Gallery, Buenos Aires

== Bibliography ==
- VV.AA., Fotógrafos argentinos del siglo XX, Centro Editor de América Latina, Buenos Aires, 1982.
- D'AMICO, A., FACIO, S., Fotografía Argentina Actual=Photographie Argentine Actuelle=Argentine Photography Today, La Azotea; Editorial Fotográfica de América Latina, Buenos Aires, 1981.
