= Sara Facio =

Argentine photographer (1932–2024)

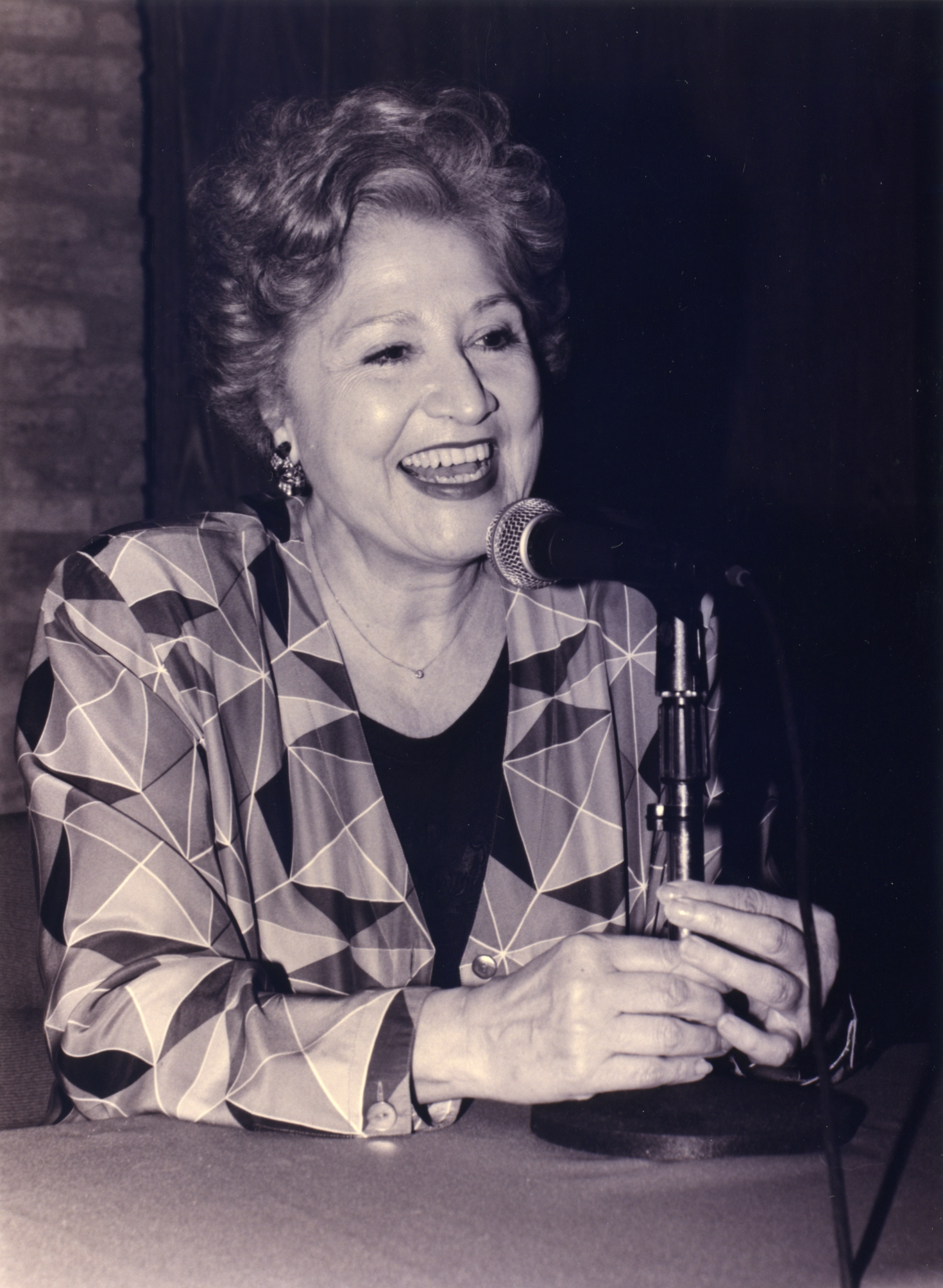
- Facio in 1995
- Born: 18 April 1932; San Isidro, Argentina
- Died: 18 June 2024 (aged 92); Buenos Aires, Argentina
- Occupations: Photojournalist, publisher
- Years active: 1957–2024
- Partner(s): María Elena Walsh (1978–2011; her death)
- Awards: Konex Award (1992)

Sara Facio (18 April 1932 – 18 June 2024) was an Argentine photojournalist and publisher. She was best known for having photographed, along with Alicia D'Amico, various cultural personalities, including Argentine writers Julio Cortázar, María Elena Walsh and Alejandra Pizarnik. She co-founded the publishing house "La Azotea" alongside María Cristina Orive in 1973.

Facio was instrumental in establishing a publishing house for photographic work in Latin America and for the creation of a prominent photographic exhibition space in Argentina.

== Career ==
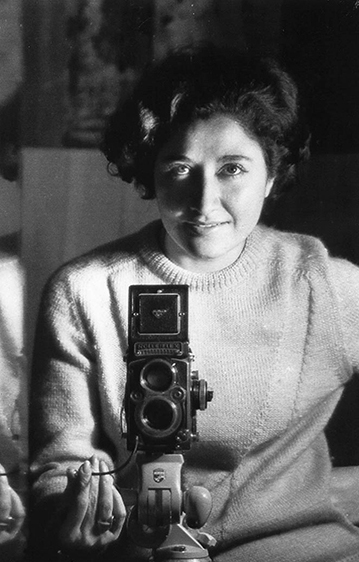
Facio in 1968

Facio began working as an assistant to Annemarie Heinrich and started taking her own photographs in 1957.

In 1960, Facio and Alicia D'Amico opened a photography studio together. Facio co-founded La Azotea with María Cristina Orive in 1973. La Azotea was the first publishing house printing photo books in Latin America.

Following the 1978 "Latin American Colloquiums of Photography" held in Mexico City, Facio worked with fellow artists to co-found the Argentine Photography Council (Spanish: Consejo Argentino de Fotografía).

In 1985, Facio established the Fotogalería of the Teatro Municipal General San Martín, which has become one of the most prominent photographic exhibition spaces in Argentina. Facio served as the director of the gallery until 1998.

"What I do in photography is to ensure that the day I die they do not say that a cow died but that a person who saw that died. And what I saw is in my photos. As if to say, 'This is my city, my people, the one I admire, the one I like.' That is my canon."

— Sara Facio, in response to the question by Maria Moreno for Página 12 in 2000

One of her most notable works of photojournalism was her coverage of Peronism in Argentina during the 1970s. She was noted for photographing marchers and protesters at Plaza de Mayo in Buenos Aires, which was different as most photojournalists focused their works through aerial views of Casa Rosada. During her career, she was also known for photographing Jorge Luis Borges, Julio Cortázar, Astor Piazzolla, Pablo Neruda, Gabriel García Márquez and Mario Vargas Llosa.

In 1996, Facio illustrated Manuelita, a book of poetry by María Elena Walsh. A large exhibition of her work, taken between 1972 and 1974 and focusing on the effect that Juan Domingo Perón had on the country, was shown at the Museo de Arte Latinoamericano de Buenos Aires, MALBA, in 2018. She was granted the Platinum Konex Award from Argentina in 1992.

Her work is in the collection of the Museum of Modern Art, MoMA.

Facio donated 25% of the photographs that make up the photographic heritage of the National Museum of Fine Arts from her personal archive.

Aside from photography, Facio also wrote books and published more than twenty personal books from the time when she began writing in 1968. She also published anthological books in 2012 and 2016.

=== Gallery ===
Media related to Works by Sara Facio at Wikimedia Commons

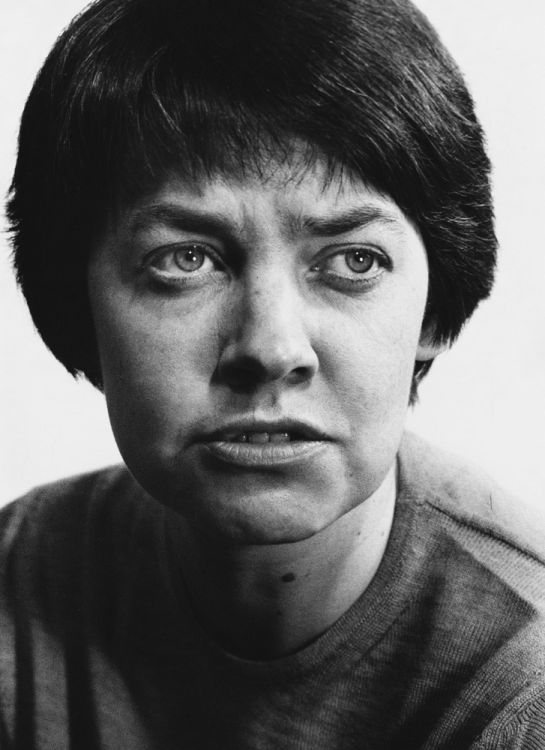
María Elena Walsh, 1965

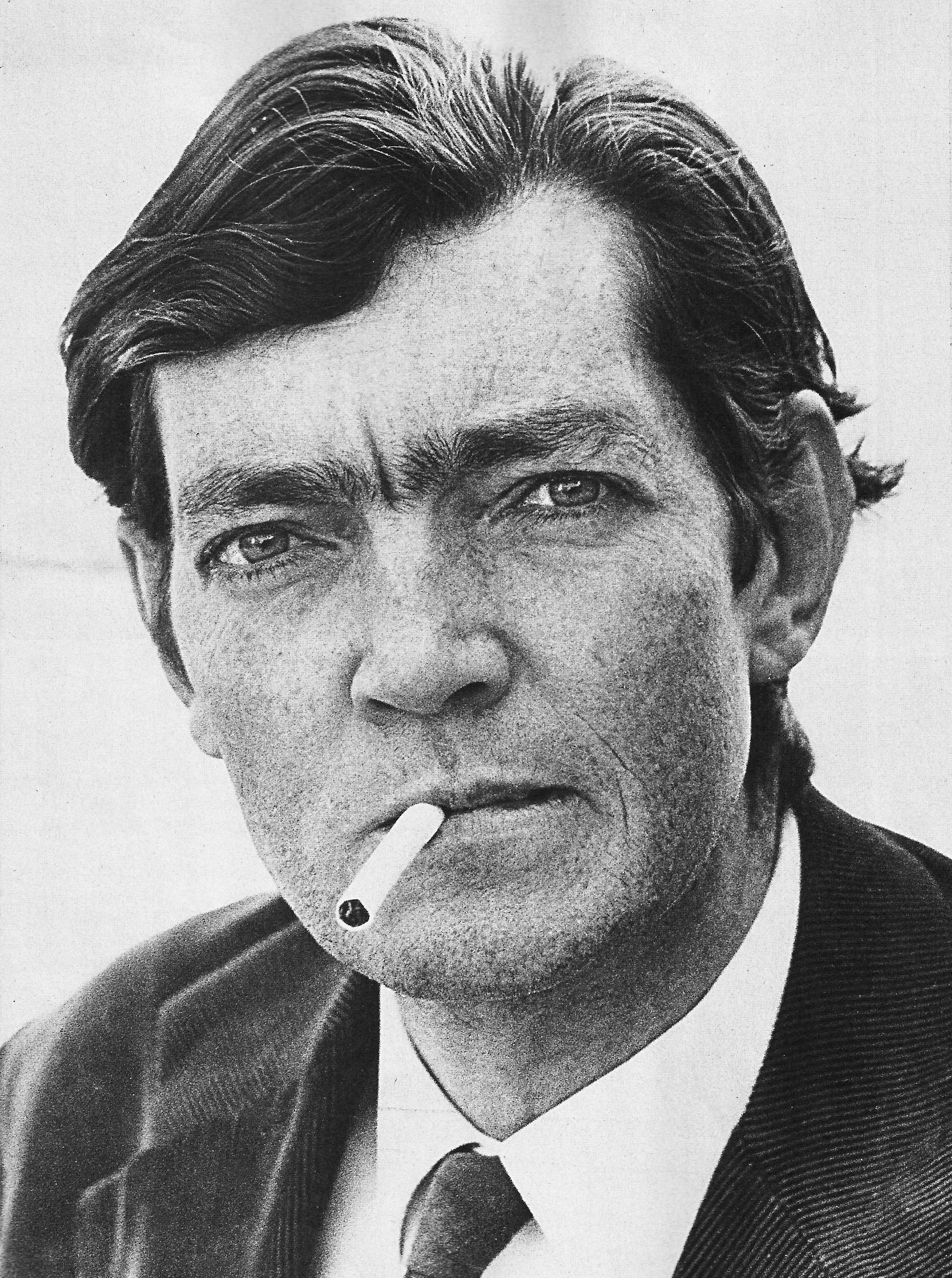
Julio Cortázar, 1967

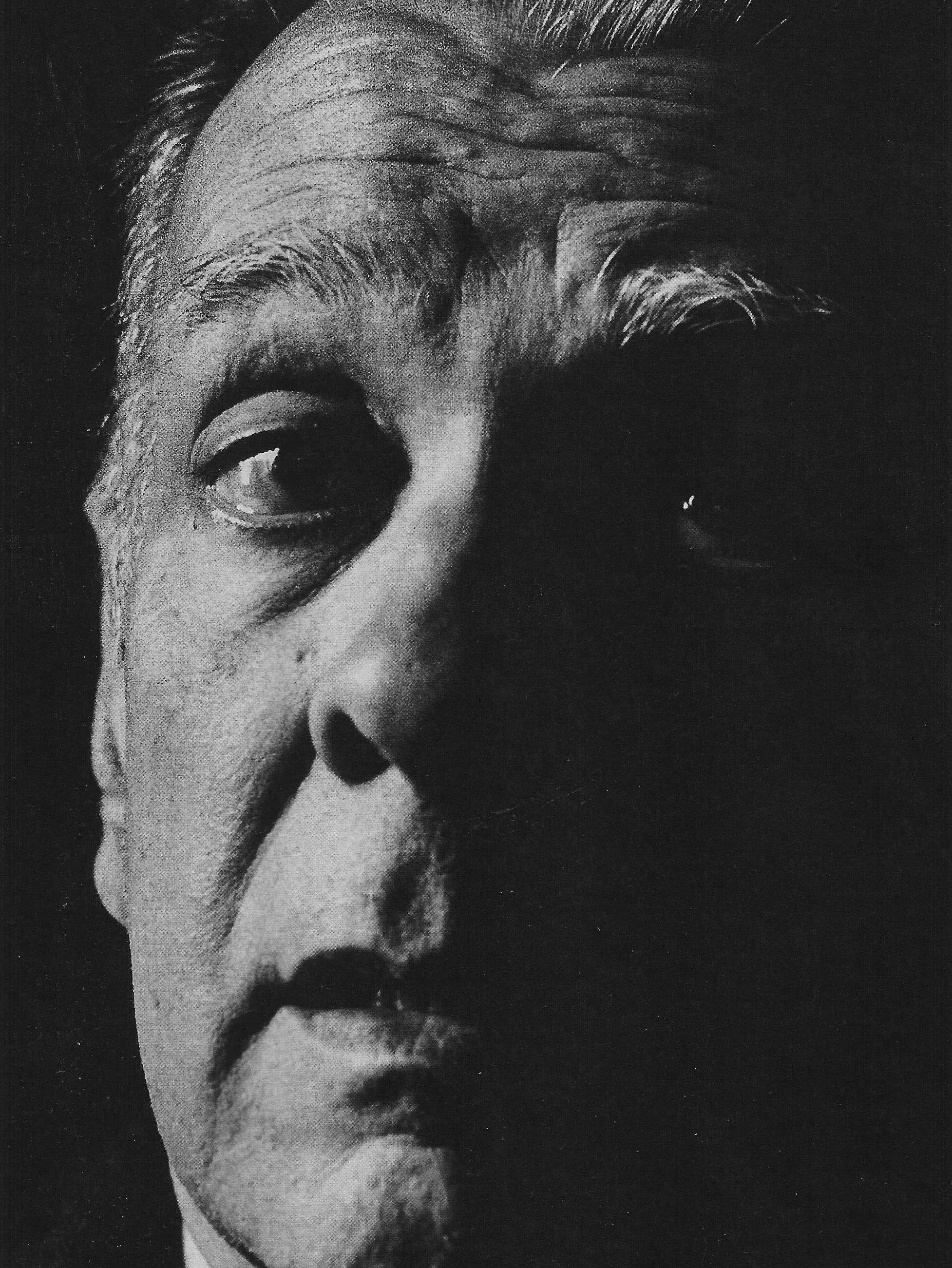
Jorge Luis Borges, 1968

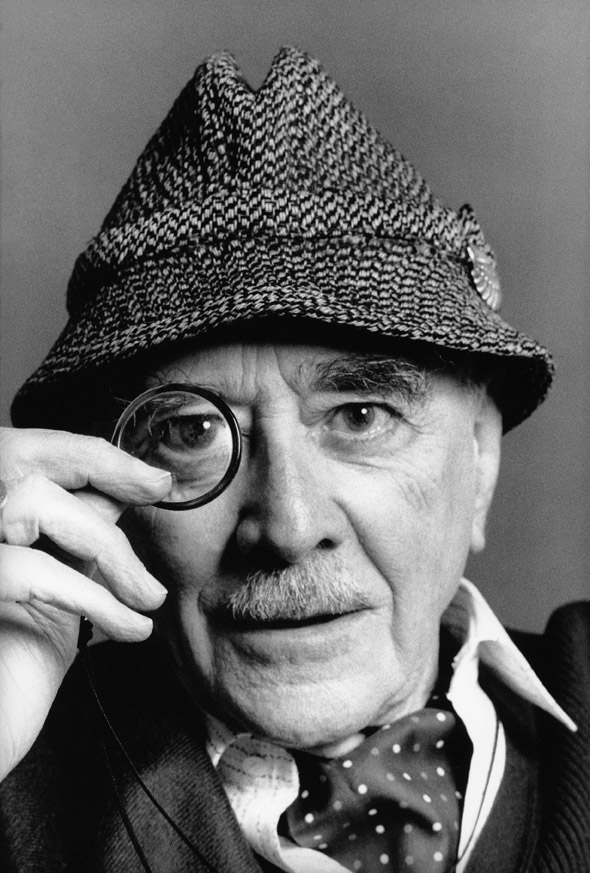
Manuel Mujica Lainez, 1969

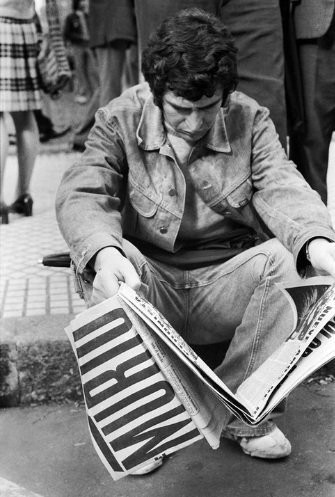
Los funerales del Presidente Perón, 1974

== Personal life ==
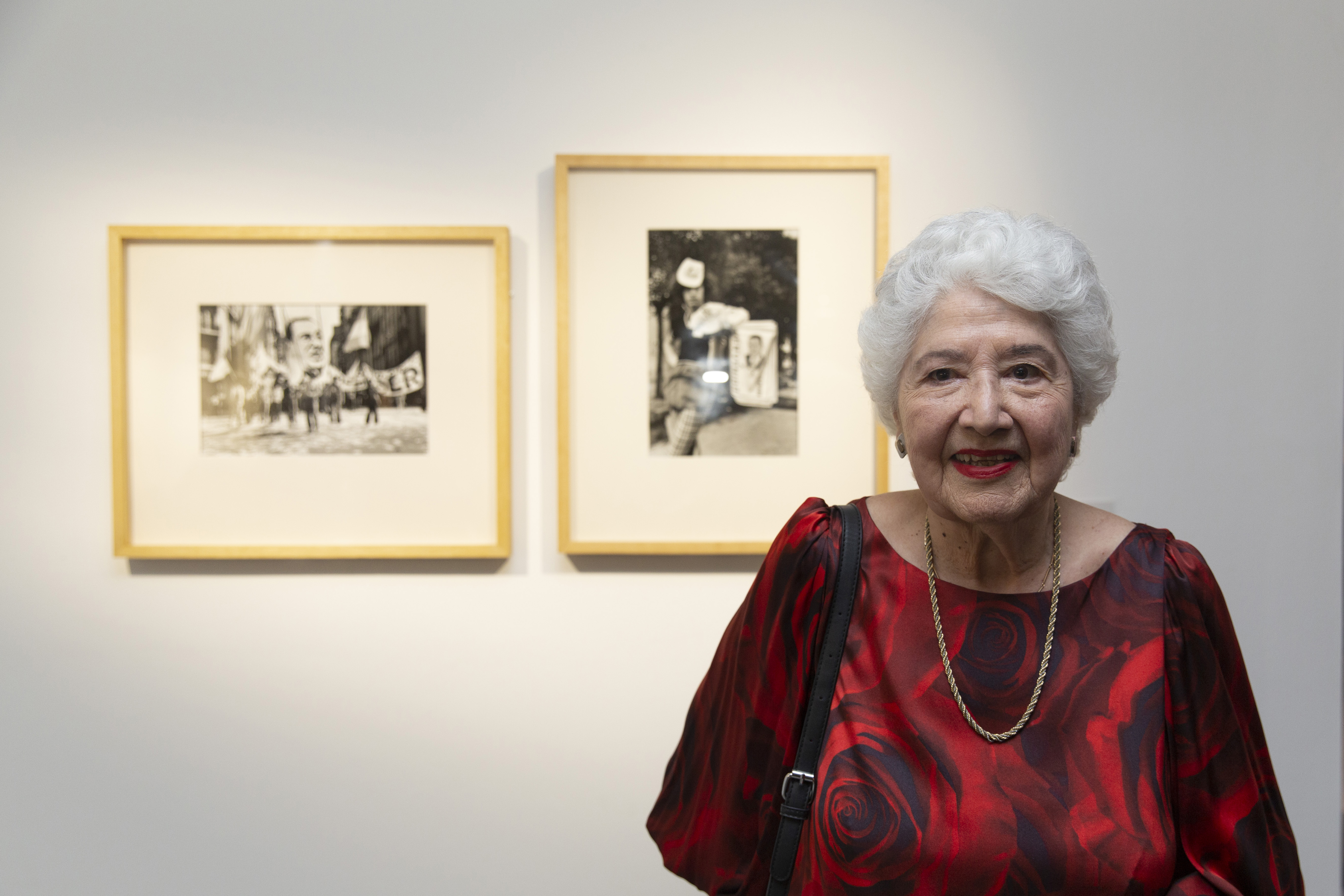
Facio standing in front of two of her works in 2019

Facio was born in San Isidro, Argentina in 1932. She graduated from the Escuela Nacional de Bellas Artes in 1953. Afterward, she received a scholarship from the French government and began residing in Paris, where she studied visual arts and photography.

Facio was a lesbian. Her partner was María Elena Walsh, from 1978 until her death in 2011.

Facio died in Buenos Aires on 18 June 2024, at the age of 92.

== Awards and honours ==
- 1982: Konex Award – Photography (Spanish: Premio Konex:Fotografía) together with Alicia D'Amico by the Konex Foundation
- 1992: Platinum Konex Award (Spanish: Premio Konex de Platino) in Photography by the Konex Foundation
- 2002: Grand Jury Konex Award – Visual Arts (Spanish: Jurado Premios Konex) by the Konex Foundation
- 2019: National Award for Artistic Career (Spanish: Premio Nacional a la trayectoria artística) by Argentia's Ministry of Culture

== Selected publications ==
- Buenos Aires, Buenos Aires (in Spanish). Photography by Sara Facio and Alicia D'Amico. Text by Julio Cortázar. Buenos Aires: Editorial Sudamericana. 1968.
- Neruda, Pablo (1973). Geografía de Pablo Neruda [Geography of Pablo Neruda] (in Spanish). Photographs by Sara Facio and Alicia D'Amico. Barcelona: Aymà. ISBN 978-84-209-0165-7.
- Facio, Sara; D'Amico, Alicia (1973). Retratos y Autorretratos: Escritores de América Latina [Portraits and Self-portraits: Writers of Latin America] (in Spanish). Photography by Sara Facio and Alicia D'Amico. Text by various authors. Buenos Aires: Ediciones Crisis.
- Facio, Sara; D'Amico, Alicia (1976). Cómo Tomar Fotografías [How to Take Photographs] (in Spanish). Buenos Aires: La Azotea.
- Humanario (in Spanish). Photography by Sara Facio and Alicia D'Amico. Text by Julio Cortázar. Buenos Aires: La Azotea. 1976.
- Facio, Sara (1980). Actos de fe en Guatemala [Acts of Faith in Guatemala] (in Spanish). Photography by Sara Facio and María Cristina Orive. Text by Miguel Ángel Asturias. Buenos Aires: La Azotea.
- Facio, Sara, ed. (1981). Fotografia Argentina actual = Photographie Argentine actuelle = Argentinian Photography Today (in Spanish and English). Buenos Aires, Argentina: La Azotea.
- Facio, Sara; D'Amico, Alicia; Walsh, María Elena (1985). Fotografía Argentina: 1960–1985 (in Spanish). Photography by Sara Facio and Alicia D'Amico. Text by María Elena Walsh. Buenos Aires: La Azotea. ISBN 978-950-9536-02-9.
- Facio, Sara (1988). Grete Stern (in Spanish and English). Buenos Aires, Argentina: La Azotea. ISBN 978-950-9536-05-0.
- Facio, Sara (1992). Retratos: 1960-1992 [Portraits: 1960-1992] (in Spanish and English). Text by María Elena Walsh. Buenos Aires: La Azotea. ISBN 978-950-9536-14-2.
- Facio, Sara (1995). La Fotografía en la Argentina: Desde 1840 a nuestros días [Photography in Argentina: From 1840 to the present day] (in Spanish and English). Buenos Aires, Argentina: La Azotea. ISBN 978-950-9536-17-3.
- Facio, Sara, ed. (1996). Fotografía Argentina Actual DOS (in Spanish and English). Buenos Aires, Argentina: La Azotea Editorial Fotográfica. ISBN 978-950-9536-19-7.
