= Emma Kirchner =

German photographer (1830–1909)

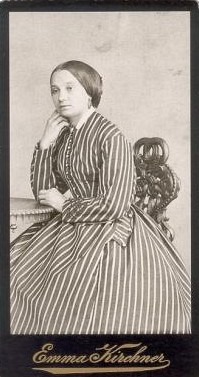
Self-portrait of Emma Kirchner on her business card (taken between 1863 and 1871)

Emma Kirchner (born Johanna Frederika Doris Emma Kirchner; 30 March 1830 – 10 February 1909) was a German photographer who lived and worked in the Netherlands. She was the first, and for over 30 years, the only professional woman photographer working in Delft and the surrounding area.

== Early life, education and influences in Leipzig ==
Johanna Frederika Doris Emma Kirchner was born in Leipzig on 30 March 1830, the eldest daughter of Johanna Frederika Fritzsche and Carl Pancras Kirchner, a tailor. Three years later, her sister Maria Amalia Louisa was born, but her father died just four months later. Her mother continued to run the family tailor's shop. In 1841 the family moved into a house at 7 Neukirchhof in the centre of Leipzig (destroyed in the Second World War, and now called Matthäikirchhof). Not far from there, her mother opened a new tailor's shop at 24 Große Fleischergasse.

At the age of 22, Emma Kirchner gave birth to her daughter Elisa Augusta Doris Ida (called Doris) on 26 December 1852. The father was the Leipzig publisher and bookseller Rudolph Löes, but they did not marry. Her sister Maria had also given birth to a daughter, Emma, a few days earlier.

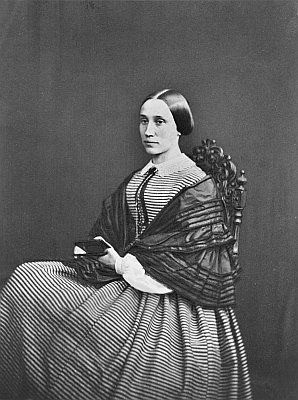
Emma Kirchner age c. 25 (in 1855). Photographer: Bertha Wehnert-Beckmann

Due to the location of her home and her mother's place of work in Leipzig, the local early photographic studios are thought to have been a familiar sight to and influence on Emma Kirchner. On 19 August 1839 Louis Daguerre had published a photographic process, the daguerreotype, released for free use internationally (except in England and Wales). There is evidence of its use in Leipzig that year and of printed instructions for taking photographs using the daguerreotype being published in the city.

There was a photographic studio in the Große Fleischergasse, the street where Kirchner's mother ran her tailor's shop. Not far away at Burgstraße 8, Europe's first professional woman photographer, Bertha Wehnert-Beckmann, like Kirchner the daughter of a tailor, ran her photographic studio. Beckmann had previously worked in Dresden and travelled as a self employed photographer, opening her studio in 1843 with daguerreotypist Eduard Wehnert who she then married. By 1847 Wehnert-Beckmann was widowed and ran her Leipzig studio with employees. From 1849 to 1851 she worked in New York in her own successful photo studio on Broadway, then on her return to Leipzig, she bought a property in a good residential area and had a house with a studio built. Researchers assume that Emma Kirchner received her training as a photographer from Wehnert-Beckmann, but there is no definitive evidence for this.

In 1849, the writer and women's rights activist Louise Otto-Peters founded and published the women's political weekly Frauen-Zeitung in Leipzig until she was effectively banned from the profession by the Lex Otto (the colloquial term for the twelfth paragraph of the press law of the Kingdom of Saxony of 14 March 1851, which prohibited women in Saxony from publishing or co-editing newspapers. The law was named after Otto-Peters and was introduced specifically for her case). Otto-Peters lived permanently in Leipzig from 1860 and published the socially critical novel Neue Bahnen in 1864, in which she addressed the problems of a working, single woman. The novel's lead character received training from an independent photographer with her own studio. Whilst there is no definitive evidence of Kirchner's training or professional photographic activity in Leipzig, she is thought to have learned the photographic craft during this time, as well as the basic knowledge of running a business. When Kirchner moved to the Netherlands, she declared her profession as a photographer upon arrival, and opened her photo studio shortly after.

== Living and working in the Netherlands ==
In 1860, Kirchner's sister Maria married the gunmaker and blacksmith Frederik Gräfe from Delft and moved to the city. On 6 November 1863, Emma Kirchner and her mother also moved to Delft. They lived at Wijk 1, No. 179 (today Vijverstraat 11). Kirchner registered as a photographer with the Delft Wijkmeester (the official responsible for a district). Before the end of the year, she and her brother-in-law Frederik Gräfe opened a photographic studio under the name E. Kirchner & Co in the Zuiderstraat, which ran parallel to the street she lived in. The business cards for their studio show different house numbers and, for a short time, her residential address. Historian Petra Notenboom concluded from her research that this occurred through several periods of alterations to the studio.

In September 1871, Kirchner and Gräfe parted as business partners. From then on, her brother-in-law Gräfe worked as a photographer in the same street until 1898, opening a second branch in Rotterdam from 1882 to 1886 and made a name for himself as a Hoflieferant (a purveyor to the court under a royal warrant of appointment) lithographer and printer.

In 1875 Kirchner entered into a new business partnership with Henri de Louw (full name Johannes Hendricus Jacobus de Louw), who married her daughter Doris in July of that year. She had employed him as an apprentice about three years earlier. From then on, the studio advertised vitreous enamel portraits and the enlarging of visiting cards. In 1876 the younger couple moved into their own flat and had their first child. After about a year of working together under the name Henri de Louw en Emma Kirchner, the business partners separated and de Louw opened his own photography studio at the Koornmarkt in Delft.

Kirchner's mother died in 1878, and her sister Maria in 1883. Kirchner continued to run her own studio until May 1899, when she retired at 69 years old. From 1863 until the end of her working life, she had been the only female professional photographer in Delft and the surrounding area. She sold her studio to Johannes van Doorne. He had been trained by Gräfe and was employed by Kirchner as an assistant from 1890.

After retiring, Kirchner first moved to The Hague, where her daughter Doris's family now lived. After her daughter's divorce in 1901, she moved with her to Amsterdam. She spent the last years of her life with her daughter, living with the family of her granddaughter, who had married the Dutch composer Bernard Zweers.

Emma Kirchner died on 10 February 1909 at the age of 78.

== Work and legacy ==
Delft Municipal Archives own a collection of photographs by Emma Kirchner and describe her as "a talented portraitist whose photographs are striking for their artful compositions".

- Daguerreotypes and Photographs
- Portraits from all walks of life: ladies, gentlemen, children, families and business people.
- Photographs of working situations, especially of women
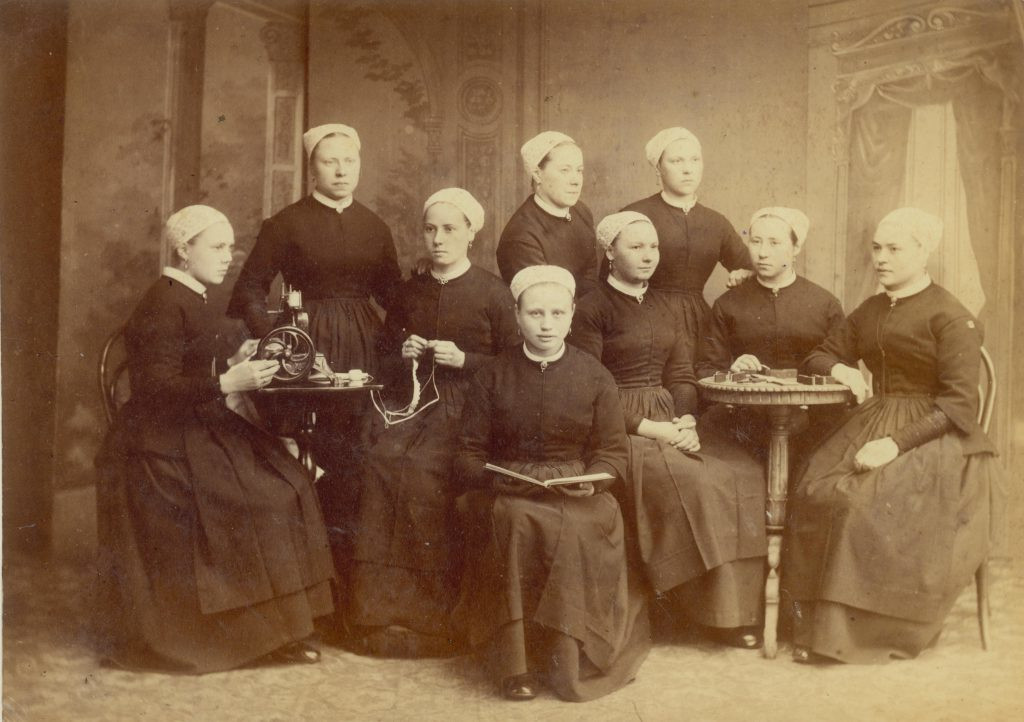
Orphans living at the Orphanage at the Oude Delft, around 1880

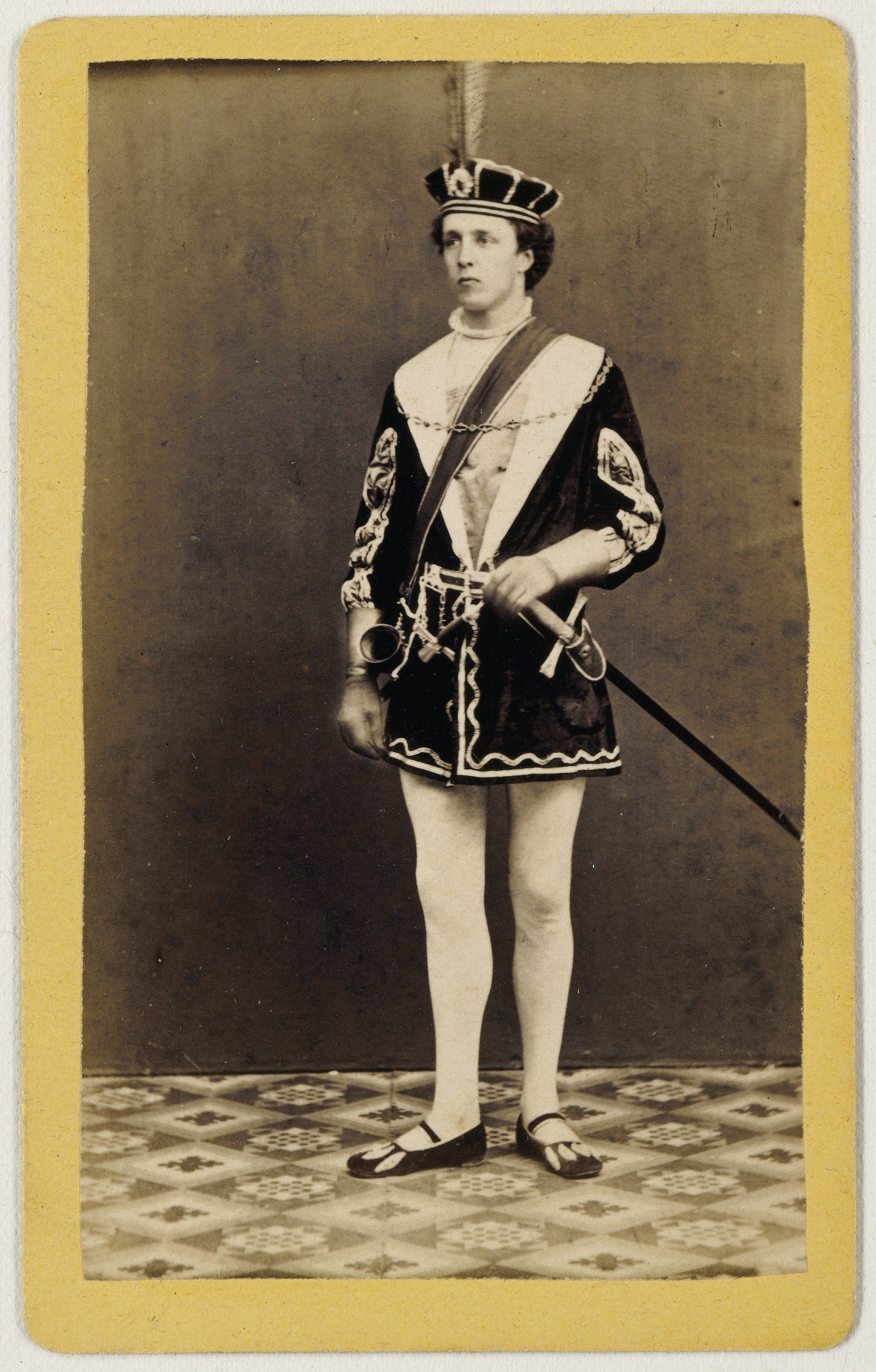
Portrait of the (presumed) Delft student W.H. Havelaar, around 1873

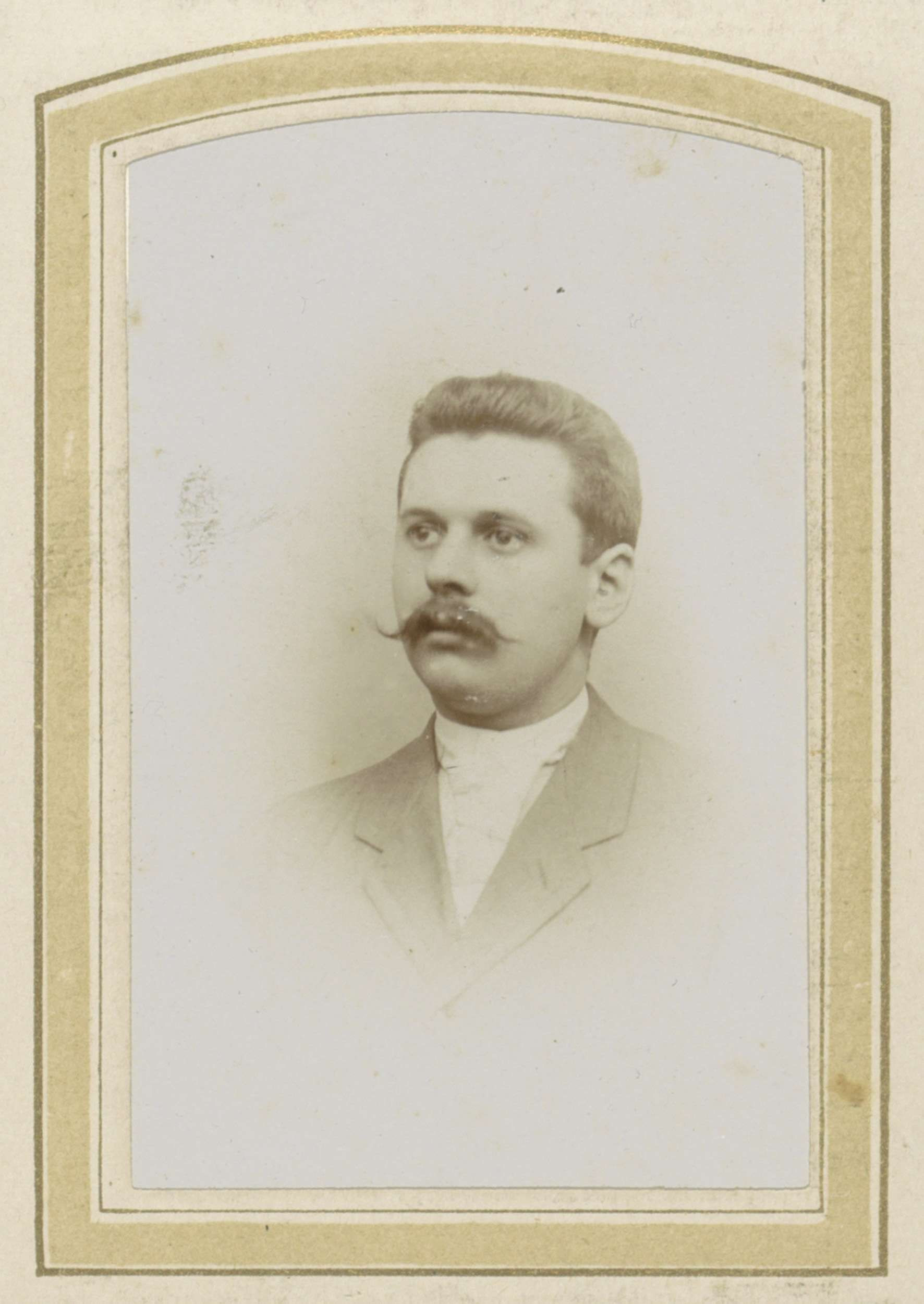
Portrait of a Man, c. 1863-1899

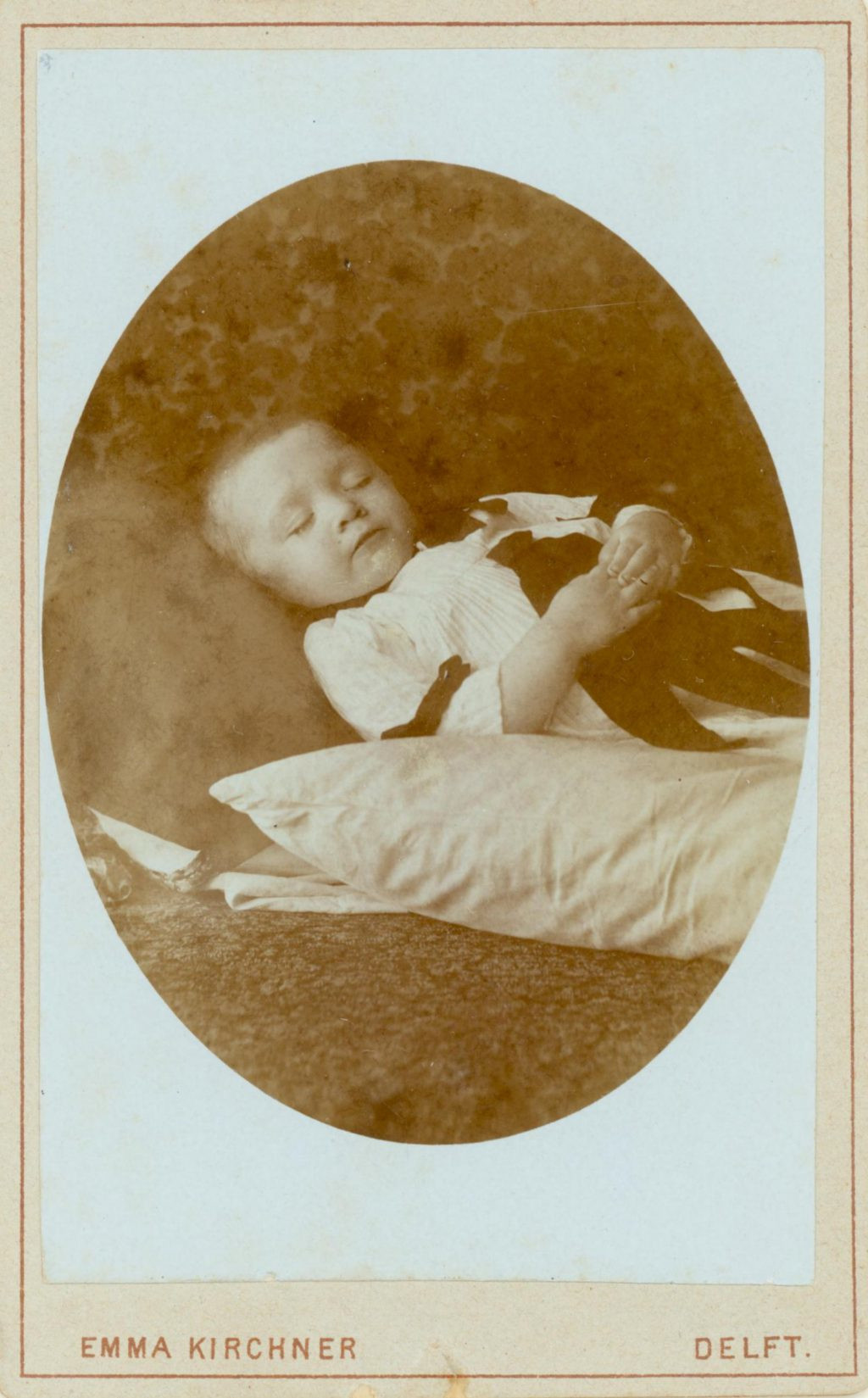
Death portrait of a child on a cushion, late 19th century

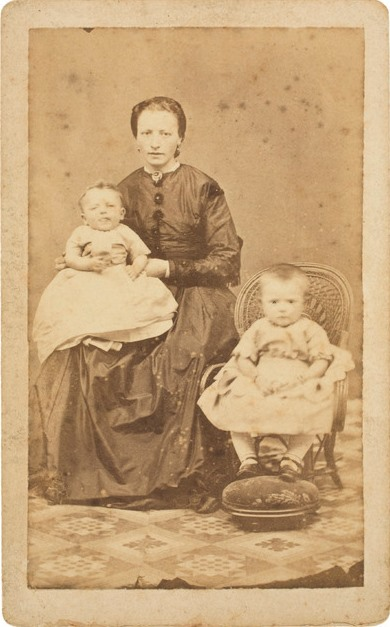
Portrait of Catharina Johanna Kikkert (1846-1886) with two children

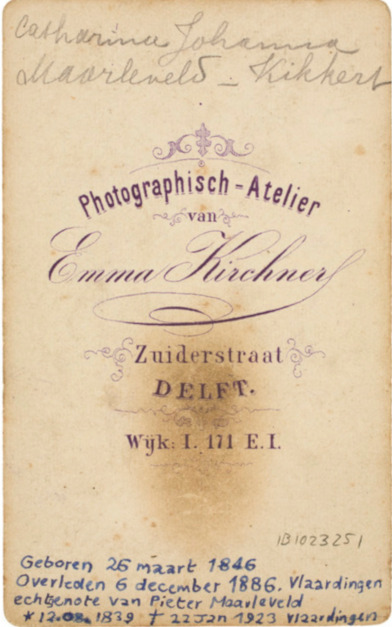
Back of portrait of Catharina Johanna Kikkert (1846-1886) with two children
