= María Cristina Orive =

Guatemalan photographer

María Cristina Orive (1930/1931 – 2 September 2017) was a Guatemalan photographer who has worked as a photojournalist. Together with Sara Facio, she founded the Buenos Aires publishing house La Azotea which specializes in publishing the work of Latin American photographers.

== Biography ==
Born in Antigua, she first worked as a radio and newspaper reporter covering art, music and theatre for Radio Faro Aviateca and El Imparcial. She then moved to Paris where, in addition to working as a correspondent for El Imparcial, she presented ORTF Spanish-language television programmes on Latin American artists. She then started to work as a photojournalist for ASA Press, contributing to journals such as the Spanish version of Life. Moving to South America, she sailed through the Panama Canal on a Soviet ship, took impressive images of Eva Duarte and the funeral of Juan Perón, and met Salvador Allende and other celebrities.

When she was just 30, together with the Argentine photographer Sara Facio, she founded La Azotea, a publishing house in Buenos Aires devoted to the work of Latin American artists, including Luis González Palma from Guatemala and Martín Chambi from Peru, among others. She published the work of women photographers such as Annemarie Heinrich, Grete Stern and Adriana Lestido. The first business of its kind in South America, it has published the work of some 100 photographers, many publications running to the second or third edition.

== Death ==
Orive died on 2 September 2017, aged 86.

== Literature ==
- Facio, Sara; Orive, María Cristina; Asturias, Miguel Angel (1999). Actos de fe en Guatemala. La Azotea. ISBN 978-950-9536-22-7.
