= Geneviève Élisabeth Disdéri =

French photographer (c.1817–1878)

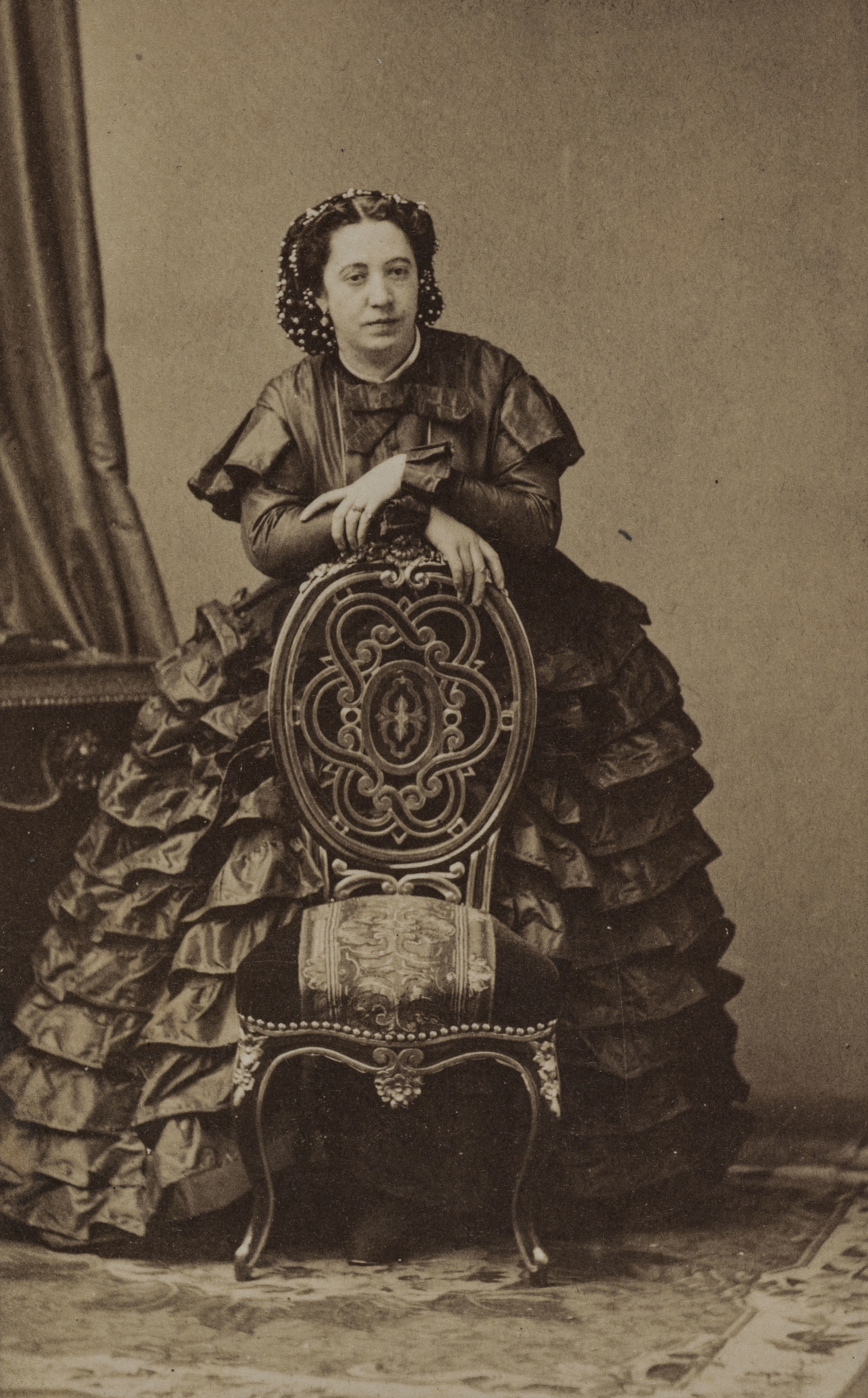
Portrait of Geneviève Élisabeth Disdéri

Geneviève Élisabeth Disdéri (née Francart, c. 1817 – 1878) was an early French photographer. In 1843, she married the pioneering photographer André-Adolphe-Eugène Disdéri, partnering with him in their Brest daguerreotype studio from the late 1840s. After her husband left for Paris in 1852, Geneviève continued to run the atelier alone. She is remembered for her 28 views of Brest, mainly architectural, which were published as Brest et ses Environs in 1856. In 1872, she moved to Paris, opening a studio in the Rue du Bac where she was possibly assisted by her son Jules. Trade listings indicate she continued to operate her studio until her death in a Paris hospital in 1878. She was one of the first female professional photographers in the world, active only shortly after Bertha Beckmann and Brita Sofia Hesselius.

== Life ==
Geneviève-Élisabeth Disdéri was born Geneviève Élisabeth Francart in France in 1817. She was the daughter of an industrialist, Nicolas Francart and Geneviève Joséphine Ternois, her father worked in the city called Brest also in France. Her father died in April 1832. Later on, she met Adolphe Disdéri, a French photographer who began his career as a daguerreotypist. Later on he created his own type of carte de visite, it consisted of a small picture secured onto a card. He patented that type and it became popular amongst people to collect and exchange them in the late 1850s.

=== Career ===
Geneviève-Élisabeth Disdéri, who already had some experience as a professional photographer, married André-Adolphe-Eugène Disdéri in 1843 and together they had six children, of whom only a son survived. In 1848, they moved to Brest and opened a daguerreotype studio. Élisabeth's brother was a deputy commissioner in Brest and assisted them financially. In 1852, her husband left Brest to open a studio in Paris because of political and financial difficulties. However, Élisabeth stayed in Brest and continued to work in the studio until the late 1860s.

While on her own she created and mastered a lot of techniques. She kept her studio running by producing the carte de visite photographs. During this time the photographers mostly produced portrait pictures. Outdoor pictures were very rare, the exposure time was too long and the materials needed for it to be produced were too much to deal with. Nonetheless, Élisabeth made a name for herself by taking the two most popular exterior pictures. The pictures were later acquired by George Cromer, an American collector. Her two photographs were called "Ruins of the abbey of Pointe St Mathieu next to Brest" and "Cimetière de Plougastel" (Group in the Plougastel-Daoulas cemetery). Both photographs date from 1856 but only the former was signed. Both pictures seemed to have embraced the new collodion technique, which many people believe she learned with her husband when she was in Paris. Her pictures depicted architectural and life (people) aspects.

She moved to Paris in 1872 and opened her own studio. She died on December 18, 1878, in a hospital, at the age of 61.

== Gallery ==
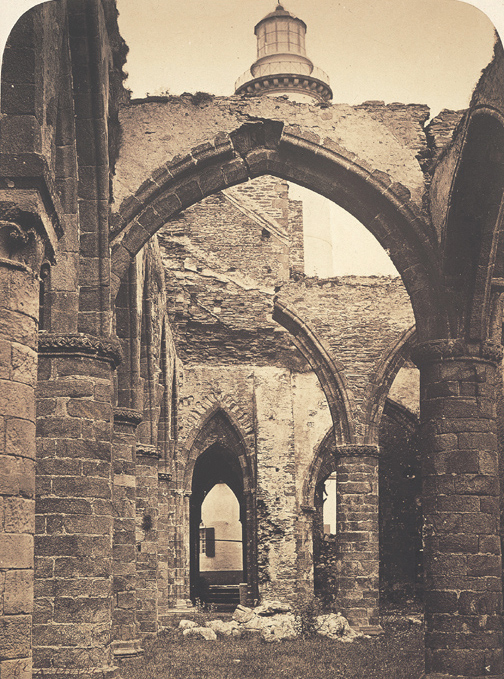
Ruins of St Mathieu

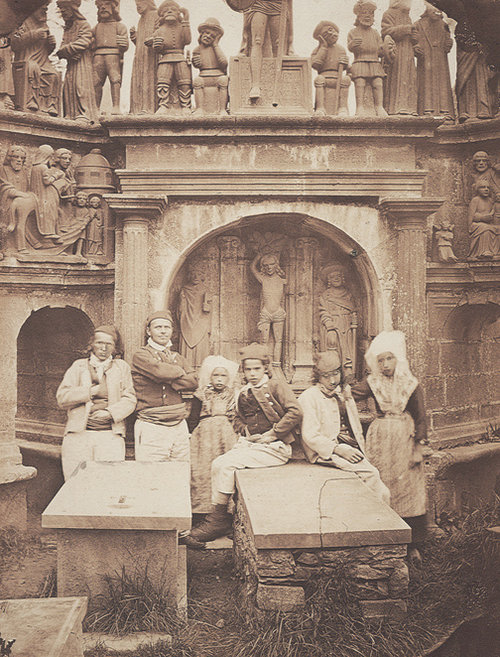
Cimetière de Plougastel
