= Bertha Beckmann =

German photographer (1815–1901)

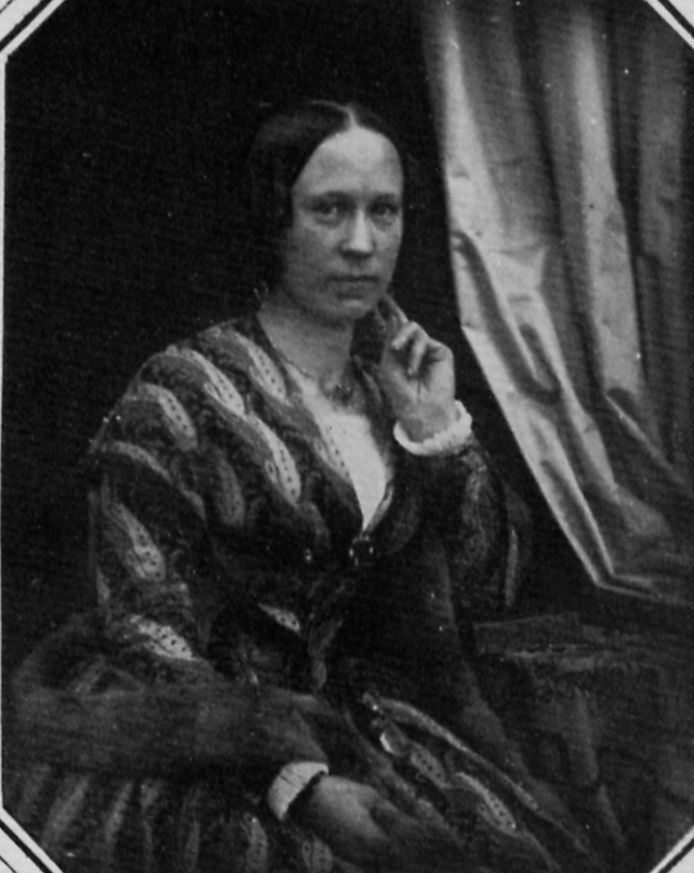
Bertha Beckmann, self-portrait c. 1850

Bertha Wehnert-Beckmann (25 January 1815 – 6 December 1901) was a German photographer. She appears to have been Germany's first professional female photographer, and was possibly also the first professional female photographer in the world, being active a few years prior to Brita Sofia Hesselius and Geneviève Élisabeth Disdéri. Together with her husband, she opened a studio in Leipzig in 1843 and ran the business herself from his death in 1847.

== Biography ==
Born in Cottbus, in the Province of Brandenburg of the Kingdom of Prussia, Wehrnert-Beckmann first worked as a hairdresser in Dresden in 1839. There, in 1840, she met her future husband, Eduard Wehnert (1811–1847) a photographer, who introduced her to the daguerreotype process and to the recently introduced color-tinting process based on glass-plate negatives which allowed an unlimited number of prints.

In 1843, together with her husband, she opened a studio in Leipzig, becoming Germany's first known professional female photographer. After her husband's death in 1847, she continued to run the business herself. In 1849, she went to the United States where she opened studios in New York, first at 62 White Street and later at 385 Broadway. While in America, she received a diploma for special services to portrait photography. She returned to Leipzig in 1851 after transferring her New York business to her brother. In 1866, she moved her place of business to Leipzig's Elsterstraße where she had several employees. Her studio became one of the most notable addresses in the city. She retired in 1883 at the age of 68.

Beckmann worked in the daguerreotype photographic process. The exhibit representing her work, which resides at The Leipzig Museum of City History, could be one of the most valuable contributions to early history of photography. She kept up with the most current trend of her craft, including diligently learning stereo-photography, upon its invention.

== Exhibitions ==
Wehnert-Beckmann was one of two photographers from Saxony to exhibit at the 1854 Erste Allgemeine Deutsche Industrieausstellung (First German Industrial Fair) in Munich where she displayed paper prints in addition to daguerreotypes. Today her work can be seen in Leipzig's Stadtgeschichtliches Museum (City Museum).

== Assessment ==
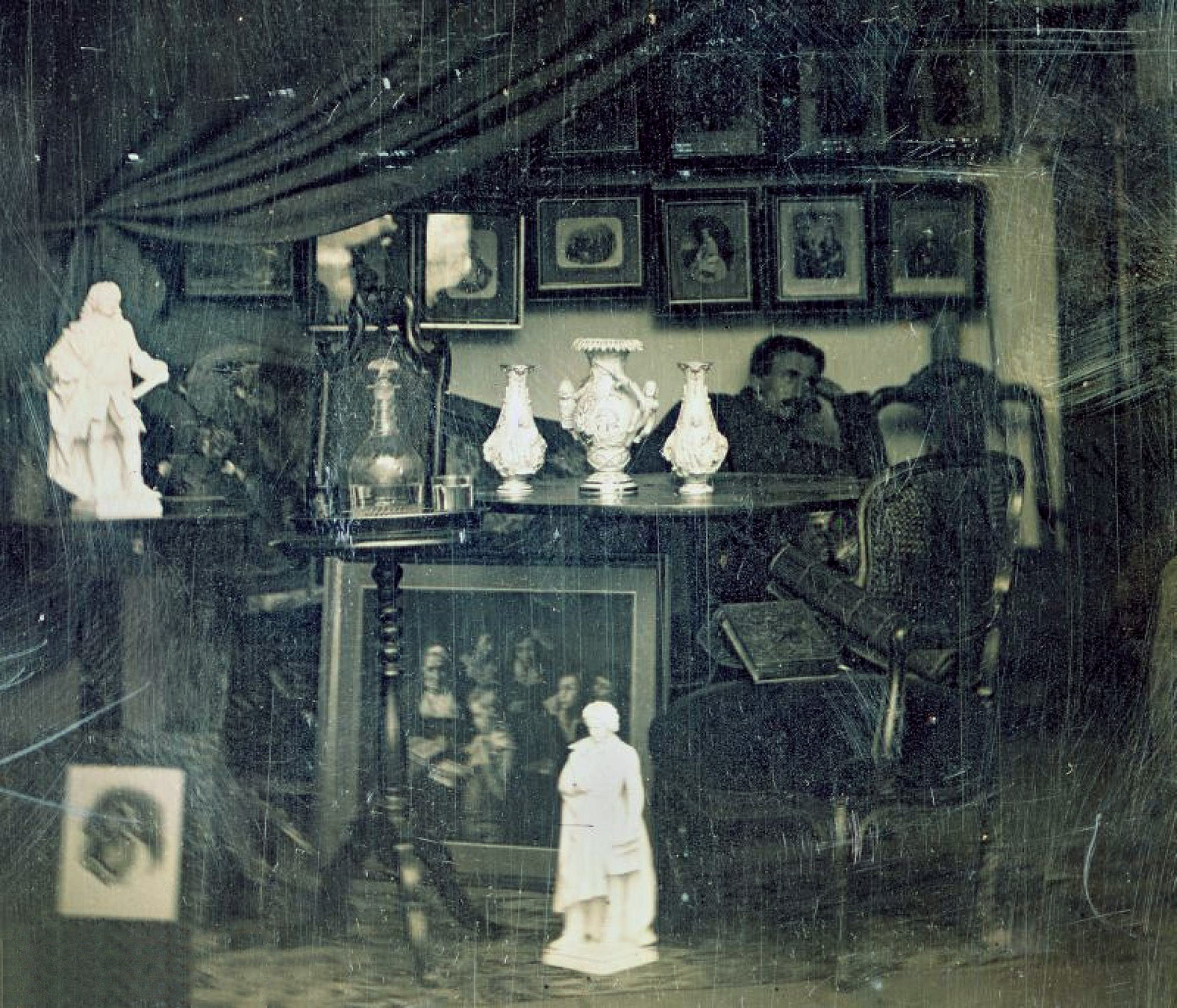
A photograph by Wehnert-Beckmann of her studio c. 1850

Her work combined a human approach with high levels of technical and artistic quality. She specialised in portrait photography, particularly portraits of children. Her interest in technical innovations, use of modern advertising methods, and business acumen contributed to her commercial success as a photographer.

== Works ==
While living in New York, notable subjects such as President Millard Fillmore, ambassadors, and other politicians came to her to be photographed. Upon returning to her Leipzig study, she became the first in her city to begin working with nude photography. She also added a list of famous individuals to her photographic portfolio upon returning to her home city. These individuals included Clara Schumann, Johannes Brahms, Franz Dominic Grassi, Karl Heine and many others. In addition, Beckmann has been credited with some of the first architectural photographs of Leipzig (1855–1860), which documented the city and its features before some were destroyed, such as Peter's Gate (1860).
