= Annemarie Heinrich =

Argentine photographer (1912–2005)

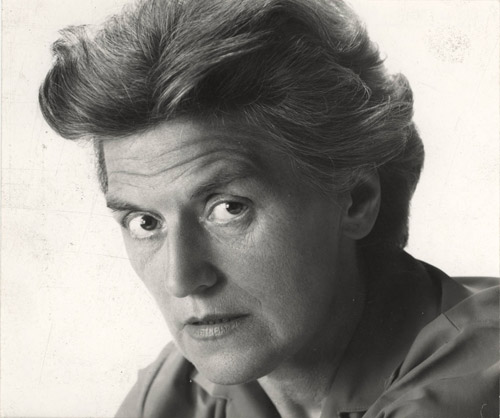
- Heinrich photographed by her son Ricardo Sanguinetti
- Born: 9 January 1912; Darmstadt, German Empire
- Died: 22 September 2005 (aged 93); Buenos Aires, Argentina
- Resting place: La Chacarita Cemetery
- Occupation: Photography

Annemarie Heinrich (9 January 1912 – 22 September 2005) was a German-born naturalized Argentine photographer, who specialized in portraits and nude photographs. Heinrich is considered one of Argentina's most important photographers.

She is known for having photographed various celebrities of Argentine cinema, such as Tita Merello, Carmen Miranda, Zully Moreno and Mirtha Legrand; as well as other cultural personalities like Jorge Luis Borges, Pablo Neruda and Eva Perón. She also photographed landscapes, city scenes, animals, and abstracts. Her photographs of South America hold significant ethnographic value, showing changes to the area through the 20th century.

== Early life ==
Heinrich was born in Darmstadt. She went to school in Berlin, before moving to Larroque, Entre Ríos Province, with her family in 1926, her father having been injured during the First World War. Heinrich studied dance, music, and scenography, which would contribute to her distinctive photographic style and dramatic use of lighting.

Heinrich apprenticed with other European expatriate photographers, including Austrian photographer Melitta Lang.

== Career ==
In 1930, she opened her first studio in Villa Ballester, Buenos Aires. She also married Ricardo Sanguinetti, a writer under the name Alvaro Sol, in the same year. Two years later she moved to a larger studio and began photographing actors from the Teatro Colón.

The beginning of his career was marked by his work as a portraitist of major figures in entertainment, including film, theater, radio, and photo novels. Heinrich co-founded Foto Club Argentino and was a founding member of Consejo Argentino de Fotografía (Argentine Council on Photography) and the Consejo Latinoamericano de Fotografía (Latin American Council on Photography). Her photos were also the cover of magazines such as El Hogar, Sintonía, Alta Sociedad, Radiolandia and Antena for forty years.

In Argentina during the Second World War, Heinrich was part of the anti-war movement, Consejo Argentino por la Paz (Argentine Council for Peace). She was also in the Junta de la Victoria (Victory Board), a women's group advocating against fascism and for the Allies. After the war, Heinrich travelled across Europe, exhibiting her work in Rome, Milan, Paris, and Zürich. In the 1950s Heinrich was part of a modernist group calling themselves Carpeta de los diez (Group of Ten).

Heinrich was brought to court in 1991 for displaying one of her nude photographs in the Avenida Callao studio window. National and international outcry in support of Heinrich and the aesthetic value of the photograph led to the case being dropped.

In 2015, the Museo de Arte Latinoamericano de Buenos Aires held a retrospective of her work. Heinrich's work was shown in New York for the first time in 2016 at Nailya Alexander Gallery in the show "Annemarie Heinrich: Glamour and Modernity in Buenos Aires."

Heinrich's archive has been digitised in a project between the British Library Endangered Archives Programme and the Institute for Research in Art and Culture, Universidad Nacional de Tres de Febrero, in 2016. The collection is available online at the Endangered Archives Programme website.

== Gallery ==
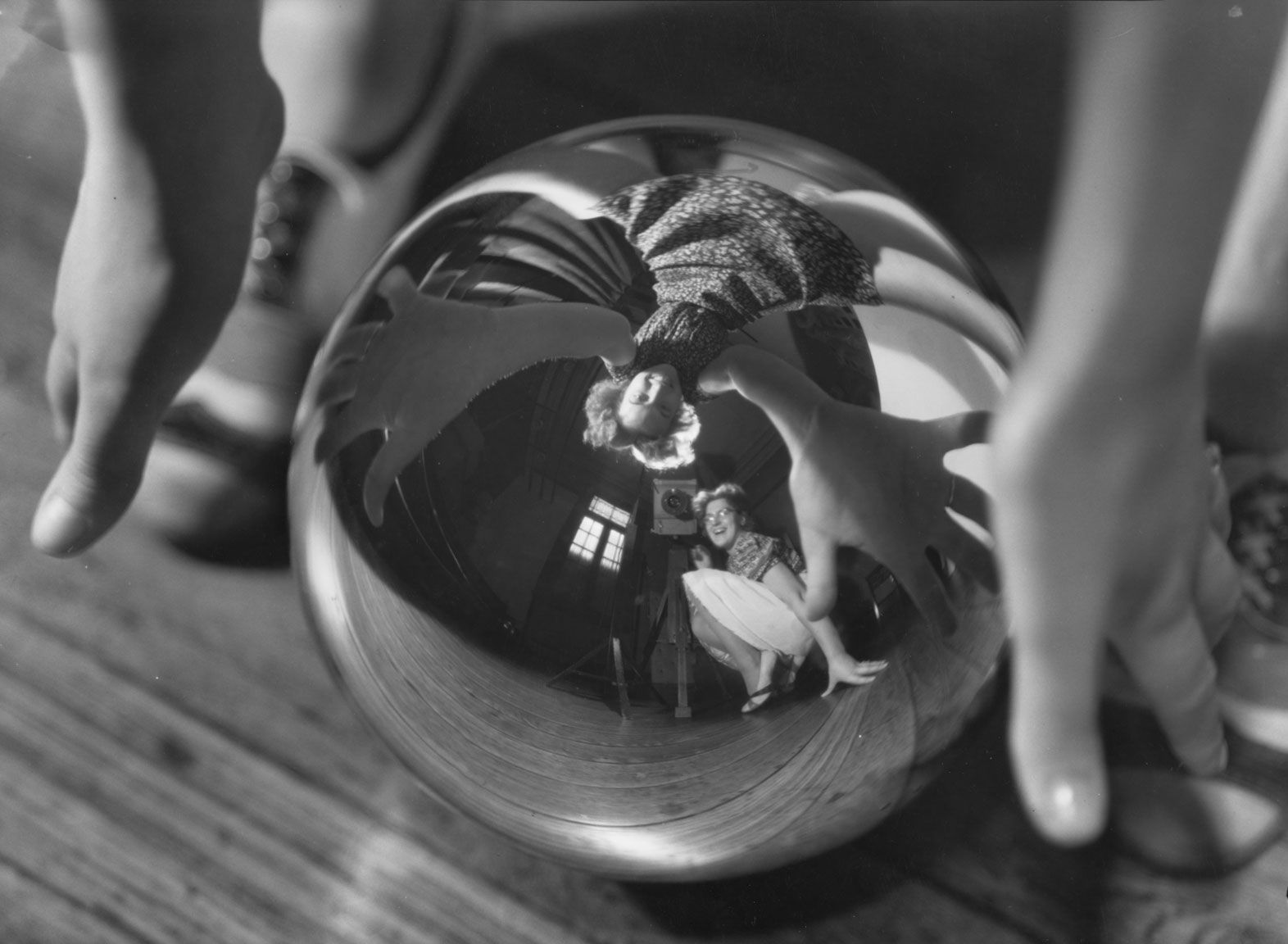
Self-portrait with Ursula, 1938

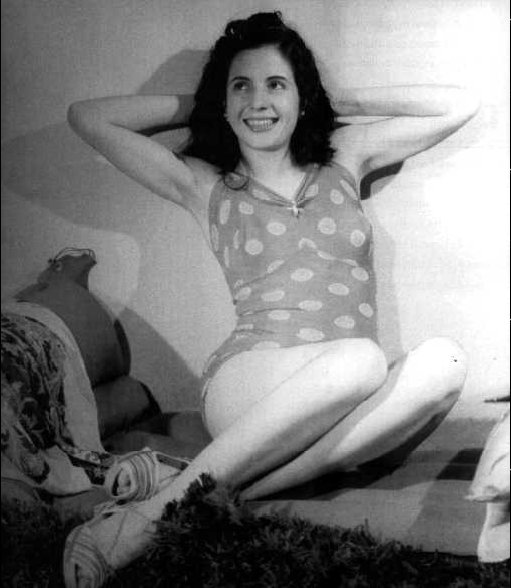
Eva Duarte, 1939

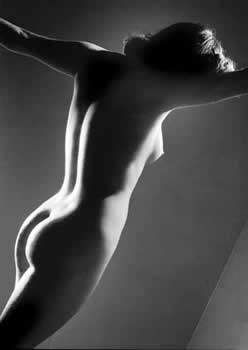
La Paloma, 1945

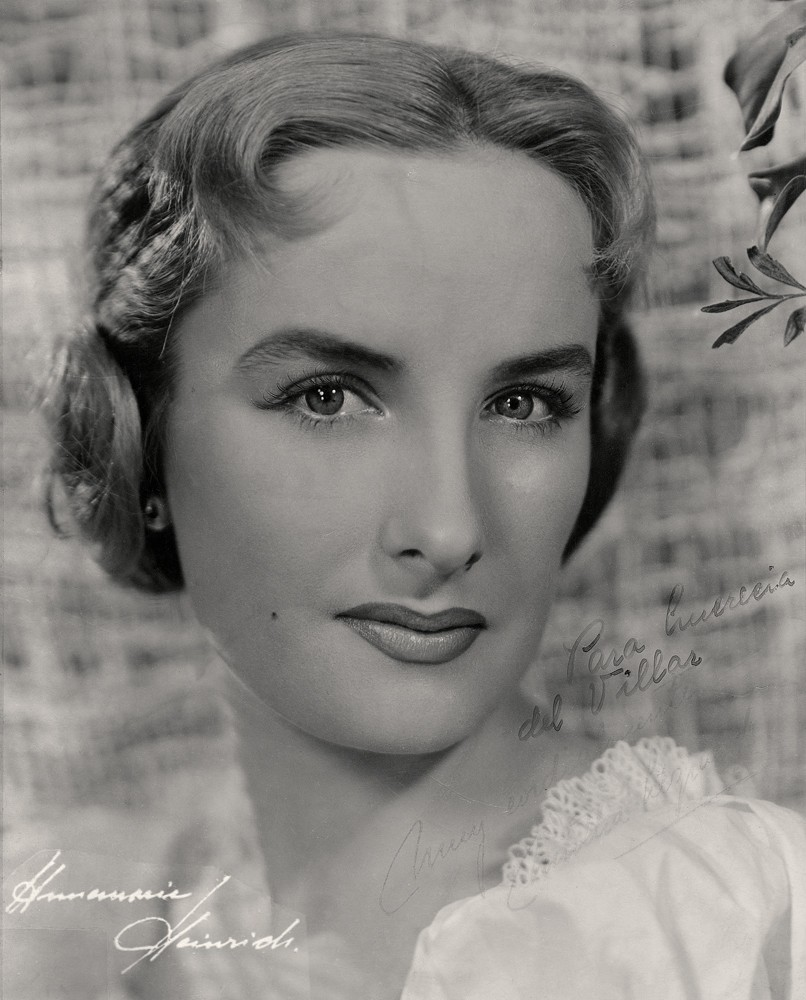
Mirtha Legrand, c. 1955

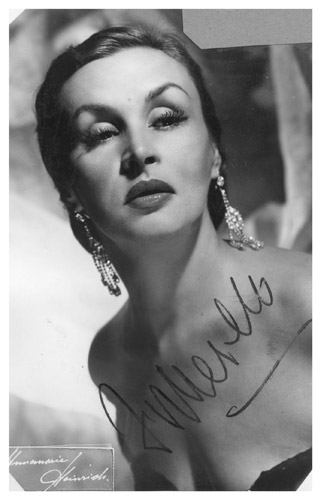
Tita Merello

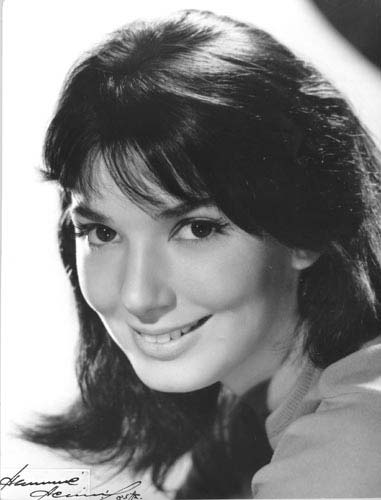
Graciela Borges

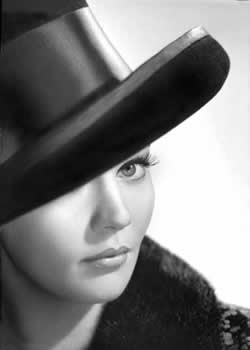
Pinky, 1964

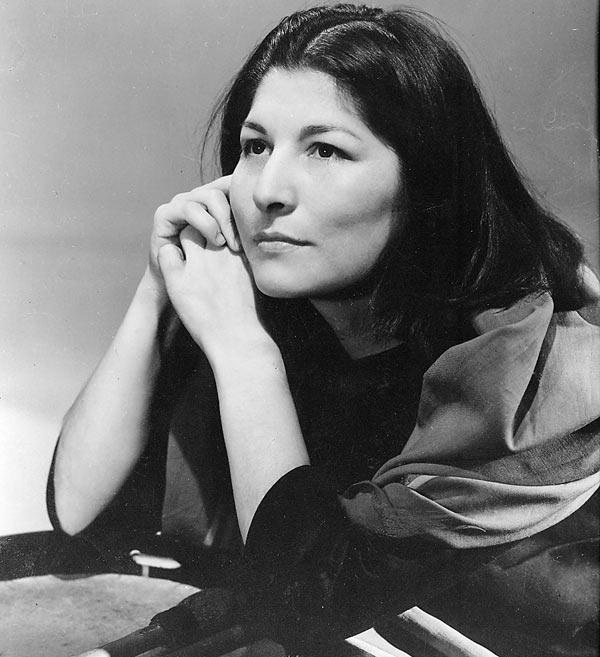
Mercedes Sosa

== Literature ==
- Heinrich, Annemarie; Facio, Sara (1987). El espectáculo en la Argentina, 1930-1970. Colección del sol (in English and Spanish). Buenos Aires, Argentina: Azotea. ISBN 978-950-9536-04-3.
- Heinrich, Annemarie; Giraudo, Victoria; Pérez Rubio, Agustín; Brodie, Jane; Heinrich, Annemarie; Heinrich, Annemarie (2015). Intenciones secretas: génesis de la liberación femenina en sus fotografías vintage = Secret intentions: genesis of women's liberation in her vintage photographs. Museo de Arte Latinoamericano de Buenos Aires. Buenos Aires, Argentina: Fundación Eduardo F. Constantini. ISBN 978-987-1271-62-7. OCLC 927446237.
