= Meanings of minor-planet names: 198001–199000 =

As minor planet discoveries are confirmed, they are given a permanent number by the IAU's Minor Planet Center (MPC), and the discoverers can then submit names for them, following the IAU's naming conventions. The list below concerns those minor planets in the specified number-range that have received names, and explains the meanings of those names.

Official naming citations of newly named small Solar System bodies are approved and published in a bulletin by IAU's Working Group for Small Bodies Nomenclature (WGSBN). Before May 2021, citations were published in MPC's Minor Planet Circulars for many decades. Recent citations can also be found on the JPL Small-Body Database (SBDB). Until his death in 2016, German astronomer Lutz D. Schmadel compiled these citations into the Dictionary of Minor Planet Names (DMP) and regularly updated the collection.

Based on Paul Herget's The Names of the Minor Planets, Schmadel also researched the unclear origin of numerous asteroids, most of which had been named prior to World War II. This article incorporates text from this source, which is in the public domain: SBDB New namings may only be added to this list below after official publication as the preannouncement of names is condemned. The WGSBN publishes a comprehensive guideline for the naming rules of non-cometary small Solar System bodies.

== 198001–198100 ==
Named minor planet	Provisional	This minor planet was named for...	Ref · Catalog
There are no named minor planets in this number range

== 198101–198200 ==
back to top

Named minor planet	Provisional	This minor planet was named for...	Ref · Catalog
198110 Heathrhoades	2004 SD_{56}	Heath Rhoades (born 1972), the computer network administrator at the Table Mountain Observatory in California	JPL · 198110

== 198201–198300 ==
back to top

Named minor planet	Provisional	This minor planet was named for...	Ref · Catalog
There are no named minor planets in this number range

== 198301–198400 ==
back to top

Named minor planet	Provisional	This minor planet was named for...	Ref · Catalog
There are no named minor planets in this number range

== 198401–198500 ==
back to top

Named minor planet	Provisional	This minor planet was named for...	Ref · Catalog
198450 Scattolin	2004 XG_{6}	Patrice Scattolin (born 1965) is one of the foremost amateur observers in Canada.	JPL · 198450

== 198501–198600 ==
back to top

Named minor planet	Provisional	This minor planet was named for...	Ref · Catalog
198592 Antbernal	2005 AK	Antonio Bernal (born 1947), Colombian ex-director of the planetarium in Medellín and a charter member of the Astronomical Colombian Network (Spanish: Red de Astronomía de Colombia, RAC)	JPL · 198592

== 198601–198700 ==
back to top

Named minor planet	Provisional	This minor planet was named for...	Ref · Catalog
198616 Lucabracali	2005 AF_{29}	Luca Bracali (born 1965), an Italian photographer and journalist.	JPL · 198616
198634 Burgaymarta	2005 AN_{54}	Marta Burgay (born 1976), an Italian radio astronomer who discovered the first known binary pulsar, PSR J0737−3039	JPL · 198634
198673 Herrero	2005 BG_{44}	Enrique ("Kike") Herrero Casas (born 1986) is an astrophysicist at the Institut d'Estudis Espacials de Catalunya (IEEC) and is also a science communicator. He specializes in exoplanets and stellar astrophysics.	IAU · 198673
198700 Nataliegrünewald	2005 CM_{25}	Natalie Grünewald (born 1970), daughter of German amateur astronomer Rolf Apitzsch who discovered this minor planet	JPL · 198700

== 198701–198800 ==
back to top

Named minor planet	Provisional	This minor planet was named for...	Ref · Catalog
198717 Szymczyk	2005 CM_{61}	Bill Szymczyk (born 1943) is an American music producer and audio engineer.	JPL · 198717

== 198801–198900 ==
back to top

Named minor planet	Provisional	This minor planet was named for...	Ref · Catalog
198820 Iwanowska	2005 ET_{249}	Wilhelmina Iwanowska (1905–1999), Polish astronomer, vice-president of the IAU in the 1970s, and first astrophysics professor in Poland	JPL · 198820

== 198901–199000 ==
back to top

Named minor planet	Provisional	This minor planet was named for...	Ref · Catalog
198963 Robsnyder	2005 UA_{438}	Robert Snyder (born 1950), American ophthalmologist and eye surgeon.	IAU · 198963
198968 Sparke	2005 UF_{506}	Philip Sparke (born 1951), English composer.	IAU · 198968
198971 Whitacre	2005 UU_{512}	Eric Whitacre (born 1970), American composer.	IAU · 198971
198989 Valeriethomas	2005 VT_{101}	Valerie L. Thomas (born 1943) is an American scientist and inventor. She is renowned for her work with several NASA projects including managing the development of the Landsat image processing systems. She is the inventor of the illusion transmitter and has promoted STEM opportunities for African Americans and women.	IAU · 198989
198993 Époigny	2005 WE_{5}	Époigny, a site in Burgundy, France, near the Le Creusot Observatory. The location's name is derived from Epona, the goddess of horses in the Gallo-Roman religion.	JPL · 198993

back to top

Preceded by 197,001–198,000	Meanings of minor-planet names List of minor planets: 198,001–199,000	Succeeded by 199,001–200,000
