= Marta Burgay =

Italian radio astronomer

Marta Burgay (born 30 November 1976, Turin) is an Italian radio astronomer. Her initial claim to fame was being the discoverer of PSR J0737-3039, the first double pulsar (two pulsars orbiting each other), through using the 64-metre Parkes radio telescope in Australia.

== Education ==
- In 1995, she graduated from Liceo Classico XVI Febbraio: Aosta, specialising in classical studies.
- In 2000, she graduated from University of Bologna with a Laurea degree in Astronomy.
- In 2004 she obtained her Ph.D. in Astronomy from the University of Bologna.

== Awards and honours ==
- Her thesis on radio pulsars won the 2005 Pietro Tacchini Prize, awarded by the Italian Astronomical Society (Italian: Società Astronomica Italiana) for the best Ph.D. thesis.
- In 2005, she was part of the international group PulSE (Pulsar Science in Europe) awarded the Descartes Prize for "Excellence in collaborative scientific research"
- In 2006, she became the first winner of the IUPAP's Young Scientists Prize in Astrophysics award.
- In 2006, she was awarded the SIGRAV prize for contribution to General Relativity and Gravitational Astrophysics.
- In 2010, she was honoured with the Vainu Bappu Gold Medal by the Astronomical Society of India.
- Asteroid 198634 Burgaymarta, discovered at Vallemare di Borbona in 2005, was named in her honour .The official naming citation was published by the Minor Planet Center on 5 October 2017 (M.P.C. 106503).
- In 2011, she was awarded the Marisa Bellisario prize, entitled "Women, Innovation, and Human Capital".
