= Wilhelmina Iwanowska =

Polish astronomer

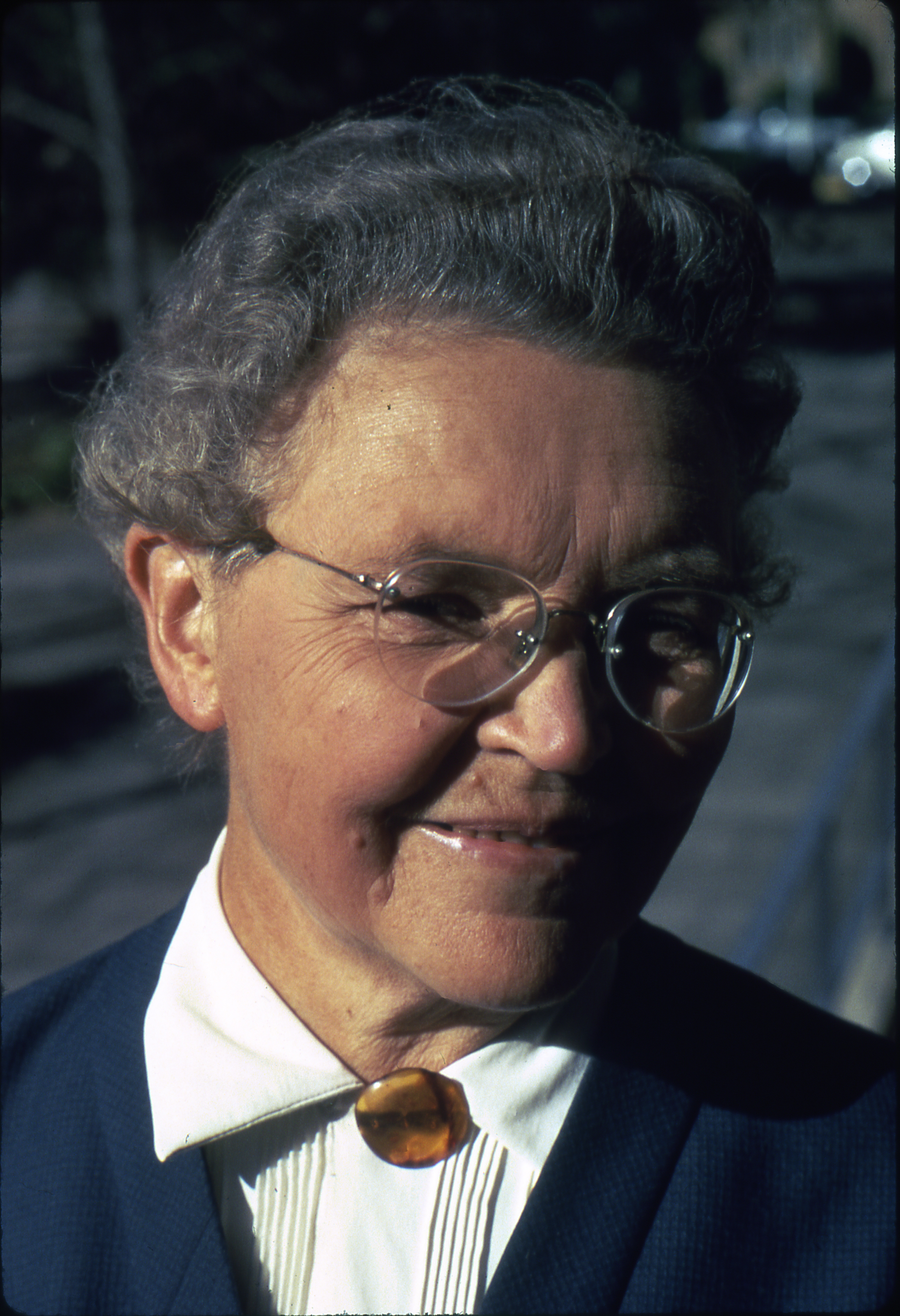
- Iwanowska in 1973
- Born: September 2, 1905; Vilnius, Lithuania
- Died: May 16, 1999 (aged 93); Toruń, Poland
- Resting place: St. Jerzy Cemetery, Toruń, Poland
- Education: USB
- Known for: first astrophysics professor in Poland; new scale of distance in the universe, stellar supergiants
- Scientific career
- Fields: Astrophysics
- Workplaces: University of Stefan Batory (USB); Astronomical Observatory of Jagiellonian University; Nicolaus Copernicus University School of Astronomy and Radioastronomy
- Patrons: Władysław Dziewulski

Wilhelmina Iwanowska (2 September 1905 – 16 May 1999) was a Polish astronomer and the first astrophysics professor in Poland. She was pioneer of astrophysics in Poland.

== Childhood and family ==
Iwanowska was born in Vilnius, Lithuania to a modest family of noble descent.

== Work and education ==
Wilhelmina Iwanowska began her studies at the University of Stefan Batory (USB) in mathematics. She began working at the university in 1927, studying under Juliusz Rudnicki. She earned her master's degree in analytic functions in 1929. Then, in 1933, she received her D.Sc. (Doctor of Science) in astronomy. By 1937, Iwanowska received her Docent degree in astronomy.

Iwanowska's astronomical career during her studies at the university. In 1926, Iwanowska was approached by Władysław Dziewulski, a professor at the university. Dziewulski offered Iwanowska a job at the Astronomical Observatory of the Jagiellonian University. By 1927, her profession as an astronomer had begun, a time period which included the rise of astrophysics in Polish science and its early accomplishments. From 1934 to 1935, she focused on astronomical spectroscopy during her internship at the Stockholm Observatory. In 1937, at the University of Stefan Batory, she presented her post-doctoral dissertation where "she characterized stellar supergiants based on the analysis of their spectral features."

From 1945 to 1999, Iwanowska worked at the university in Toruń. On 14 July 1945, she and some 200 other staff members from USB were transferred to Toruń. Iwanowska and the other scientists were successful in establishing a university in Toruń. On 26 August 1945, the Nicolaus Copernicus University was founded which included two departments, astronomy and astrophysics. She was one of the founders of the Nicolaus Copernicus University and the Toruń School of Astronomy and Radioastronomy and helped develop many of their programs. In 1946, she became the first astrophysics professor in Poland.

Iwanowska was the head of the observatory in Toruń from 1952 to 1976, which was the year of her retirement. Under her management, Dr. Iwanowska promoted nineteen doctors. Additionally, eight of her students went on to become professors. She was a frequent visitor of many observatories across Europe. She visited the United States and Canada. In January 1973, she was an honored guest of the Canadian National Nicolaus Copernicus Quincentenary Committee, the Royal Astronomical Society of Canada, and the National Research Council.

== Notable research ==
- In the course of her research, Iwanowska discovered a new scale of distance in the universe, which is considered her greatest achievement.
- In 1933, Iwanowska defended her doctoral thesis on two-color photographic observations.
- In 1937, she presented her habilitation thesis in which "she characterized stellar supergiants based on the analysis of their spectral features."
- Iwanowska's scientific bibliography includes approximately 150 works.

== Honors & distinctions ==
- From 1973 to 1979, Iwanowska was the vice president of the International Astronomical Union.
- Member, Polish Academy of Sciences.
- Iwanowska became the first Director of the Institute of Astronomy of the Copernicus University in Toruń.
- Iwanowska was an honorary doctorate at three universities, one in Winnipeg, another in Leicester, and the last in Toruń.
- In 1995, she was awarded the Great Cross of the Order of Polonia Restituta.
- In 1973, she became an honorary citizen of Winnipeg.
- In 1997, she became an honorary citizen in Toruń.
- The Pope awarded her the "Pro Ecclesia et Pontifice" medal.
- Asteroid 198820 is named in Iwanowska's memory.

== Death ==
Wilhelmina Iwanowska died on 16 May 1999, aged 93. She was buried in Toruń beside her mother, sister, and niece.
