= Luca Bracali =

Italian photographer, filmmaker and explorer

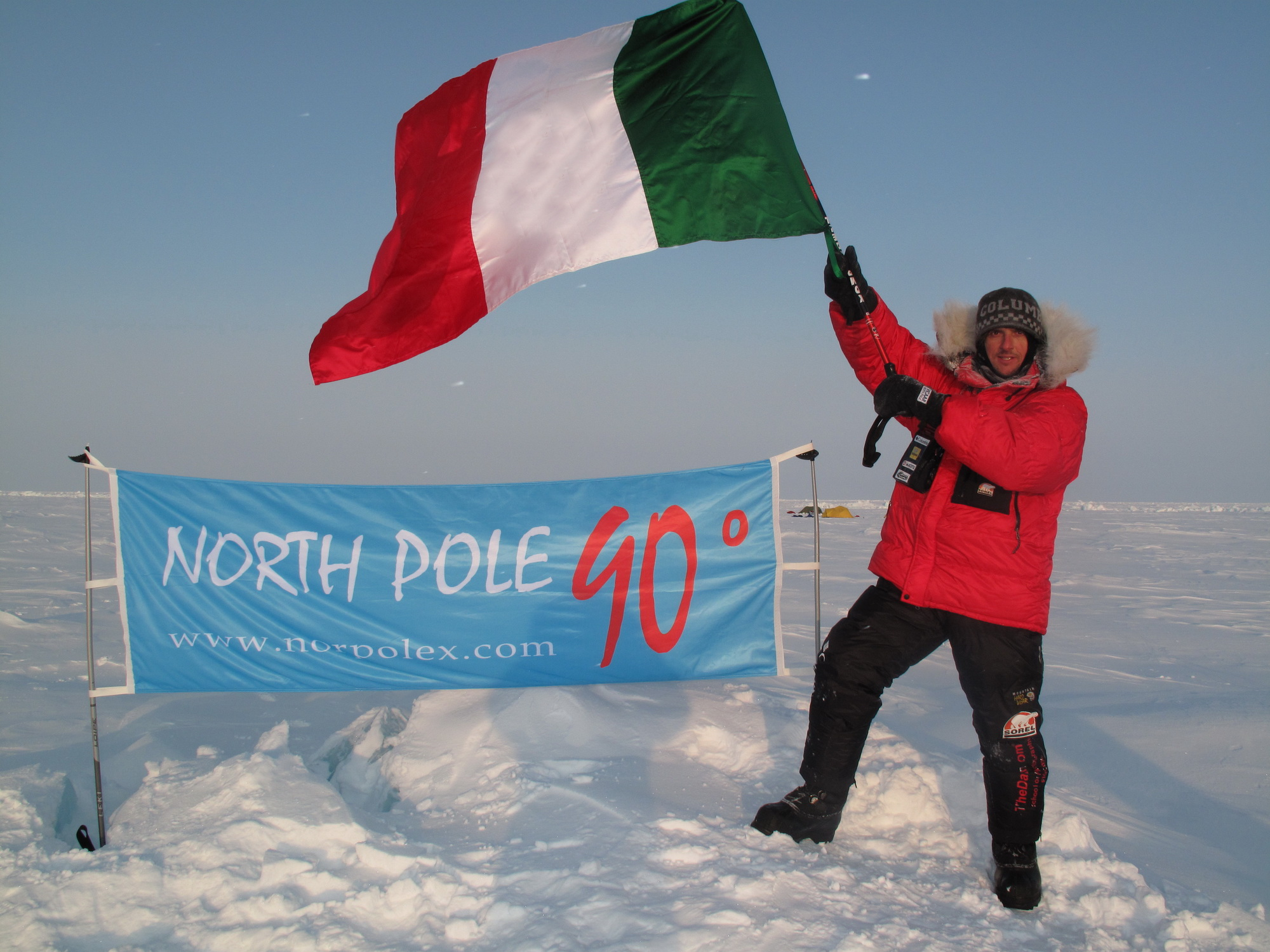
Geographic North Pole, at 90°, reached after 8 days of skiing.

Luca Bracali (born 12 April 1965) is an Italian photographer, filmmaker and explorer.

== Biography ==
Luca Bracali was born in Pistoia on 12 April 1965. He began his career as a photographer and reporter for sports newspapers and as a correspondent for the Motocross World Championships, MotoGP, and later Formula 1.

During his career he has written many articles for travel, culture and tourism magazines and twenty one of his books have been published: Storia illustrata di Pistoia, I colori del viaggio, SOS Pianeta Terra, A rose is a rose is a rose, Alba Gonzales: Amor maris; i miti scolpiti, Fantasie della Terra, Myanmar: The true essence, Pianeta Terra: Un mondo da salvare, L’Italia vista da Parigi, Rapa Nui. Il respiro della natura 1, Il respiro della natura 2, Ghiaccio Fragile, Lockdown a Firenze. Il respiro dell’arte, Lockdown a Roma. Il sorriso della città eterna, Lockdown a Milano. Il suono del silenzio, Lockdown a Venezia. Poggiata sull'acqua, sospesa nella storia, Terra una fragile bellezza - L'obiettivo sul mondo di Luca Bracali, The charming of landscapes, the nobilty of art), Over the Horizon. In 34 years of reportage he has travelled to 160 countries.

Luca Bracali is closely involved with environmental issues, such as the ice-melt and global warming, as can be seen from the photos he has taken in the Antarctic and Arctic regions. Through photographic projects he has collaborated with polar researchers from the University of Alaska, Fairbanks and the Barneo Ice Camp, which was the starting point for a Ski Eco-Expedition to the geographic North Pole in 2009. Thanks to these Polar expeditions, broadcast on more than forty radio and television programs, he was able to become a member of APECS (Association of Polar Early Career Scientists) and subsequently has collaborated with IASC (International Arctic Science Committee).

Since 2010 his pictures have been exhibited in museums and galleries in Rome, Milan, Naples, Bologna, Sofia, Kyiv, Odesa, Copenhagen, Höfn, Brussels, Yangon, Montreal and New York City, showing his own particular way of conceiving a photograph: a geometric composition of saturated colours where light plays a fundamental role. Luca Bracali is also busy in the television industry and after one year as a Tv host of a travel and adventure program aired on Sky satellite, he became the director of "Easy Driver", a weekly television program on Rai 1. Subsequently he has worked with RAI 2, especially with TG2 and TG2 and Stories and with Rai 1 in two daily programs, "Uno Mattina" and "Il caffè di Rai Uno", with documentaries and services dedicated to his explorations in documentary style, in addition to RAI 3 in "Kilimangiaro" . He is the author and producer of a project called Planet Explorer, a live-video and photo tour, designed specifically for the web, which in 2025 was the seventeenth edition after Iceland, South Africa, United States, Greece, Morocco, Norway, Vietnam, Ireland, Scotland, Swiss, Australia, Malta, Azores, Italy, Corsica, Denmark and Portugal. As Professor of photography for the Lorenzo de Medici and The Darkroom in Florence, he has taught photography courses at the Academy of Canon and then he subsequently became "ambassador" for Fujifilm. He has received fifteen awards at international photography competitions related to photography and reportage. He is the author of the cover of L'ultima Thule, the latest album of Francesco Guccini and of eighteen reports published by National Geographic. His most important exhibition, "Arctic under attack", was exhibited in April 2017 in the European Parliament. Also in 2017 he became ambassador of the non-profit association "Salviamo il Pianeta". From 2021 to 2023 he was the Italian President of the C.I.G.V. - International Great Travelers Club. The Minor Planet Center in Cambridge (United States) gave his name to the 198.616° asteroid discovered.

== Bibliography ==
- Interview (II Corriere Della Sera): The world is small for him
- Interview (La Repubblica): The greenhouse effect in 5000 shooting
- Interview (Canon): Photography and Arctic sickness
