= List of minor planets: 198001–199000 =

The following is a partial list of minor planets, running from minor-planet number 198001 through 199000, inclusive. The primary data for this and other partial lists is based on JPL's "Small-Body Orbital Elements" and data available from the Minor Planet Center. Critical list information is also provided by the MPC, unless otherwise specified from Lowell Observatory. A detailed description of the table's columns and additional sources are given on the main page including a complete list of every page in this series, and a statistical break-up on the dynamical classification of minor planets.

Also see the summary list of all named bodies in numerical and alphabetical order, and the corresponding naming citations for the number range of this particular list. New namings may only be added to this list after official publication, as the preannouncement of names is condemned by the Working Group for Small Bodies Nomenclature of the International Astronomical Union.

Near-Earth obj.	MBA (inner)	MBA (outer)	Centaur
Mars-crosser	MBA (middle)	Jupiter trojan	Trans-Neptunian obj.
Unclassified

== 198001–198100 ==
Designation			Discovery			Properties		Ref
Permanent	Provisional	Named after	Date	Site	Discoverer(s)	Category	Diam.	Ref
198001	2004 RJ_{179}	—	September 10, 2004	Socorro	LINEAR	·	1.7 km	MPC · JPL
198002	2004 RO_{179}	—	September 10, 2004	Socorro	LINEAR	V	1.0 km	MPC · JPL
198003	2004 RS_{181}	—	September 10, 2004	Socorro	LINEAR	·	1.9 km	MPC · JPL
198004	2004 RB_{182}	—	September 10, 2004	Socorro	LINEAR	·	2.1 km	MPC · JPL
198005	2004 RS_{186}	—	September 10, 2004	Socorro	LINEAR	V	1.1 km	MPC · JPL
198006	2004 RE_{187}	—	September 10, 2004	Socorro	LINEAR	·	2.0 km	MPC · JPL
198007	2004 RO_{191}	—	September 10, 2004	Socorro	LINEAR	·	2.0 km	MPC · JPL
198008	2004 RP_{191}	—	September 10, 2004	Socorro	LINEAR	·	1.9 km	MPC · JPL
198009	2004 RC_{198}	—	September 10, 2004	Socorro	LINEAR	·	1.6 km	MPC · JPL
198010	2004 RU_{199}	—	September 10, 2004	Socorro	LINEAR	EUN	2.3 km	MPC · JPL
198011	2004 RK_{200}	—	September 10, 2004	Socorro	LINEAR	·	2.6 km	MPC · JPL
198012	2004 RF_{201}	—	September 10, 2004	Socorro	LINEAR	·	2.4 km	MPC · JPL
198013	2004 RJ_{201}	—	September 10, 2004	Socorro	LINEAR	·	3.0 km	MPC · JPL
198014	2004 RS_{202}	—	September 11, 2004	Kitt Peak	Spacewatch	·	1.3 km	MPC · JPL
198015	2004 RP_{204}	—	September 12, 2004	Kitt Peak	Spacewatch	slow	2.3 km	MPC · JPL
198016	2004 RL_{205}	—	September 8, 2004	Socorro	LINEAR	·	2.5 km	MPC · JPL
198017	2004 RW_{209}	—	September 11, 2004	Socorro	LINEAR	·	3.0 km	MPC · JPL
198018	2004 RC_{218}	—	September 11, 2004	Socorro	LINEAR	·	2.4 km	MPC · JPL
198019	2004 RH_{220}	—	September 11, 2004	Socorro	LINEAR	·	2.9 km	MPC · JPL
198020	2004 RJ_{221}	—	September 11, 2004	Socorro	LINEAR	MAR · fast	3.4 km	MPC · JPL
198021	2004 RW_{221}	—	September 12, 2004	Kitt Peak	Spacewatch	·	1.6 km	MPC · JPL
198022	2004 RZ_{224}	—	September 9, 2004	Socorro	LINEAR	·	2.1 km	MPC · JPL
198023	2004 RC_{225}	—	September 9, 2004	Socorro	LINEAR	·	2.0 km	MPC · JPL
198024	2004 RB_{226}	—	September 9, 2004	Socorro	LINEAR	·	1.6 km	MPC · JPL
198025	2004 RX_{229}	—	September 9, 2004	Kitt Peak	Spacewatch	·	1.7 km	MPC · JPL
198026	2004 RB_{230}	—	September 9, 2004	Kitt Peak	Spacewatch	(12739)	2.0 km	MPC · JPL
198027	2004 RB_{231}	—	September 9, 2004	Kitt Peak	Spacewatch	·	2.1 km	MPC · JPL
198028	2004 RX_{231}	—	September 9, 2004	Kitt Peak	Spacewatch	·	1.9 km	MPC · JPL
198029	2004 RD_{233}	—	September 9, 2004	Kitt Peak	Spacewatch	·	1.3 km	MPC · JPL
198030	2004 RO_{238}	—	September 10, 2004	Kitt Peak	Spacewatch	·	1.5 km	MPC · JPL
198031	2004 RA_{240}	—	September 10, 2004	Kitt Peak	Spacewatch	·	1.3 km	MPC · JPL
198032	2004 RS_{241}	—	September 10, 2004	Kitt Peak	Spacewatch	·	1.8 km	MPC · JPL
198033	2004 RR_{244}	—	September 10, 2004	Kitt Peak	Spacewatch	NYS	1.7 km	MPC · JPL
198034	2004 RW_{244}	—	September 10, 2004	Kitt Peak	Spacewatch	·	1.5 km	MPC · JPL
198035	2004 RK_{253}	—	September 15, 2004	Siding Spring	SSS	PHO	1.7 km	MPC · JPL
198036	2004 RU_{254}	—	September 6, 2004	Palomar	NEAT	·	2.1 km	MPC · JPL
198037	2004 RY_{254}	—	September 6, 2004	Palomar	NEAT	·	1.9 km	MPC · JPL
198038	2004 RP_{256}	—	September 9, 2004	Socorro	LINEAR	·	1.6 km	MPC · JPL
198039	2004 RW_{257}	—	September 10, 2004	Needville	W. G. Dillon, M. Eastman	·	1.4 km	MPC · JPL
198040	2004 RT_{266}	—	September 11, 2004	Kitt Peak	Spacewatch	·	1.3 km	MPC · JPL
198041	2004 RN_{272}	—	September 11, 2004	Kitt Peak	Spacewatch	·	1.3 km	MPC · JPL
198042	2004 RF_{275}	—	September 12, 2004	Kitt Peak	Spacewatch	·	1.1 km	MPC · JPL
198043	2004 RF_{276}	—	September 13, 2004	Kitt Peak	Spacewatch	·	1.2 km	MPC · JPL
198044	2004 RR_{276}	—	September 13, 2004	Kitt Peak	Spacewatch	·	1.6 km	MPC · JPL
198045	2004 RJ_{281}	—	September 15, 2004	Kitt Peak	Spacewatch	·	1.1 km	MPC · JPL
198046	2004 RB_{285}	—	September 15, 2004	Kitt Peak	Spacewatch	·	1.2 km	MPC · JPL
198047	2004 RL_{288}	—	September 15, 2004	7300 Observatory	W. K. Y. Yeung	·	2.7 km	MPC · JPL
198048	2004 RR_{290}	—	September 8, 2004	Palomar	NEAT	·	4.3 km	MPC · JPL
198049	2004 RV_{290}	—	September 9, 2004	Socorro	LINEAR	·	2.0 km	MPC · JPL
198050	2004 RR_{294}	—	September 11, 2004	Kitt Peak	Spacewatch	·	3.2 km	MPC · JPL
198051	2004 RS_{298}	—	September 11, 2004	Kitt Peak	Spacewatch	·	2.1 km	MPC · JPL
198052	2004 RU_{298}	—	September 11, 2004	Kitt Peak	Spacewatch	·	1.3 km	MPC · JPL
198053	2004 RY_{301}	—	September 11, 2004	Kitt Peak	Spacewatch	NYS	1.2 km	MPC · JPL
198054	2004 RL_{305}	—	September 12, 2004	Socorro	LINEAR	·	1.4 km	MPC · JPL
198055	2004 RF_{307}	—	September 12, 2004	Socorro	LINEAR	·	3.9 km	MPC · JPL
198056	2004 RT_{309}	—	September 13, 2004	Kitt Peak	Spacewatch	V	880 m	MPC · JPL
198057	2004 RB_{310}	—	September 13, 2004	Socorro	LINEAR	·	2.0 km	MPC · JPL
198058	2004 RD_{311}	—	September 13, 2004	Palomar	NEAT	·	1.6 km	MPC · JPL
198059	2004 RM_{316}	—	September 11, 2004	Socorro	LINEAR	MAR	1.6 km	MPC · JPL
198060	2004 RH_{320}	—	September 13, 2004	Socorro	LINEAR	·	1.8 km	MPC · JPL
198061	2004 RC_{322}	—	September 13, 2004	Socorro	LINEAR	·	1.8 km	MPC · JPL
198062	2004 RH_{322}	—	September 13, 2004	Socorro	LINEAR	·	2.1 km	MPC · JPL
198063	2004 RL_{323}	—	September 13, 2004	Socorro	LINEAR	·	3.8 km	MPC · JPL
198064	2004 RG_{325}	—	September 13, 2004	Socorro	LINEAR	·	3.5 km	MPC · JPL
198065	2004 RO_{325}	—	September 13, 2004	Socorro	LINEAR	·	1.7 km	MPC · JPL
198066	2004 RB_{326}	—	September 13, 2004	Socorro	LINEAR	·	2.7 km	MPC · JPL
198067	2004 RS_{327}	—	September 14, 2004	Socorro	LINEAR	·	1.7 km	MPC · JPL
198068	2004 RU_{328}	—	September 15, 2004	Anderson Mesa	LONEOS	·	1.7 km	MPC · JPL
198069	2004 RW_{330}	—	September 15, 2004	Kitt Peak	Spacewatch	·	1.7 km	MPC · JPL
198070	2004 RQ_{333}	—	September 15, 2004	Anderson Mesa	LONEOS	·	2.3 km	MPC · JPL
198071	2004 RT_{341}	—	September 10, 2004	Kitt Peak	Spacewatch	·	1.4 km	MPC · JPL
198072	2004 RH_{342}	—	September 10, 2004	Socorro	LINEAR	·	1.9 km	MPC · JPL
198073	2004 RM_{345}	—	September 10, 2004	Kitt Peak	Spacewatch	(12739)	1.9 km	MPC · JPL
198074	2004 SH_{2}	—	September 16, 2004	Goodricke-Pigott	R. A. Tucker	·	1.8 km	MPC · JPL
198075	2004 SK_{3}	—	September 17, 2004	Anderson Mesa	LONEOS	PHO	3.5 km	MPC · JPL
198076	2004 SF_{4}	—	September 17, 2004	Kitt Peak	Spacewatch	EUN	2.0 km	MPC · JPL
198077	2004 SS_{4}	—	September 17, 2004	Socorro	LINEAR	·	2.2 km	MPC · JPL
198078	2004 SN_{14}	—	September 17, 2004	Anderson Mesa	LONEOS	·	2.5 km	MPC · JPL
198079	2004 SP_{14}	—	September 17, 2004	Anderson Mesa	LONEOS	(5)	1.8 km	MPC · JPL
198080	2004 SM_{15}	—	September 17, 2004	Anderson Mesa	LONEOS	·	1.5 km	MPC · JPL
198081	2004 SY_{15}	—	September 17, 2004	Anderson Mesa	LONEOS	·	2.7 km	MPC · JPL
198082	2004 SB_{18}	—	September 17, 2004	Anderson Mesa	LONEOS	·	1.6 km	MPC · JPL
198083	2004 SA_{19}	—	September 18, 2004	Socorro	LINEAR	·	1.7 km	MPC · JPL
198084	2004 SG_{21}	—	September 21, 2004	Socorro	LINEAR	·	3.6 km	MPC · JPL
198085	2004 SD_{22}	—	September 17, 2004	Anderson Mesa	LONEOS	MAS	1.1 km	MPC · JPL
198086	2004 SL_{23}	—	September 17, 2004	Kitt Peak	Spacewatch	NYS	2.7 km	MPC · JPL
198087	2004 ST_{24}	—	September 21, 2004	Socorro	LINEAR	·	2.5 km	MPC · JPL
198088	2004 SH_{25}	—	September 21, 2004	Kitt Peak	Spacewatch	·	1.8 km	MPC · JPL
198089	2004 ST_{25}	—	September 22, 2004	Desert Eagle	W. K. Y. Yeung	·	1.3 km	MPC · JPL
198090	2004 SC_{27}	—	September 16, 2004	Kitt Peak	Spacewatch	NYS	1.3 km	MPC · JPL
198091	2004 SS_{27}	—	September 16, 2004	Kitt Peak	Spacewatch	·	1.2 km	MPC · JPL
198092	2004 SU_{27}	—	September 16, 2004	Kitt Peak	Spacewatch	NYS	1.3 km	MPC · JPL
198093	2004 SW_{30}	—	September 17, 2004	Socorro	LINEAR	(17392)	2.1 km	MPC · JPL
198094	2004 SK_{32}	—	September 17, 2004	Socorro	LINEAR	·	1.8 km	MPC · JPL
198095	2004 SY_{32}	—	September 17, 2004	Socorro	LINEAR	·	2.4 km	MPC · JPL
198096	2004 SR_{37}	—	September 17, 2004	Socorro	LINEAR	·	3.8 km	MPC · JPL
198097	2004 SL_{38}	—	September 17, 2004	Socorro	LINEAR	EUN	1.3 km	MPC · JPL
198098	2004 SL_{40}	—	September 17, 2004	Socorro	LINEAR	·	2.2 km	MPC · JPL
198099	2004 SO_{40}	—	September 17, 2004	Socorro	LINEAR	(5)	2.0 km	MPC · JPL
198100	2004 SQ_{41}	—	September 18, 2004	Socorro	LINEAR	V	960 m	MPC · JPL

== 198101–198200 ==
back to top

Designation			Discovery			Properties		Ref
Permanent	Provisional	Named after	Date	Site	Discoverer(s)	Category	Diam.	Ref
198101	2004 SJ_{44}	—	September 18, 2004	Socorro	LINEAR	·	1.6 km	MPC · JPL
198102	2004 SX_{47}	—	September 18, 2004	Socorro	LINEAR	MAR	2.0 km	MPC · JPL
198103	2004 SZ_{48}	—	September 21, 2004	Socorro	LINEAR	·	2.7 km	MPC · JPL
198104	2004 SO_{49}	—	September 21, 2004	Socorro	LINEAR	V	890 m	MPC · JPL
198105	2004 SS_{50}	—	September 22, 2004	Kitt Peak	Spacewatch	·	2.0 km	MPC · JPL
198106	2004 SH_{51}	—	September 22, 2004	Kitt Peak	Spacewatch	·	3.5 km	MPC · JPL
198107	2004 SG_{52}	—	September 18, 2004	Socorro	LINEAR	V	1.1 km	MPC · JPL
198108	2004 SU_{53}	—	September 22, 2004	Socorro	LINEAR	·	1.9 km	MPC · JPL
198109	2004 SY_{54}	—	September 22, 2004	Socorro	LINEAR	EUN	2.4 km	MPC · JPL
198110 Heathrhoades	2004 SD_{56}	Heathrhoades	September 17, 2004	Wrightwood	J. W. Young	(5)	2.0 km	MPC · JPL
198111	2004 SZ_{56}	—	September 16, 2004	Anderson Mesa	LONEOS	·	2.4 km	MPC · JPL
198112	2004 TM_{1}	—	October 4, 2004	Kitt Peak	Spacewatch	·	4.0 km	MPC · JPL
198113	2004 TY_{1}	—	October 4, 2004	Kitt Peak	Spacewatch	V	860 m	MPC · JPL
198114	2004 TQ_{2}	—	October 4, 2004	Kitt Peak	Spacewatch	fast	2.2 km	MPC · JPL
198115	2004 TV_{2}	—	October 4, 2004	Kitt Peak	Spacewatch	·	2.2 km	MPC · JPL
198116	2004 TJ_{4}	—	October 4, 2004	Kitt Peak	Spacewatch	·	1.3 km	MPC · JPL
198117	2004 TF_{5}	—	October 4, 2004	Kitt Peak	Spacewatch	PAD	2.8 km	MPC · JPL
198118	2004 TJ_{6}	—	October 2, 2004	Palomar	NEAT	PHO	1.1 km	MPC · JPL
198119	2004 TX_{8}	—	October 4, 2004	Anderson Mesa	LONEOS	MAS	860 m	MPC · JPL
198120	2004 TZ_{11}	—	October 5, 2004	Goodricke-Pigott	R. A. Tucker	·	1.4 km	MPC · JPL
198121	2004 TM_{12}	—	October 7, 2004	Socorro	LINEAR	·	3.8 km	MPC · JPL
198122	2004 TY_{14}	—	October 9, 2004	Goodricke-Pigott	R. A. Tucker	CLA	2.0 km	MPC · JPL
198123	2004 TB_{15}	—	October 4, 2004	Kitt Peak	Spacewatch	(5)	1.3 km	MPC · JPL
198124	2004 TT_{15}	—	October 11, 2004	Kitt Peak	Spacewatch	NYS	1.4 km	MPC · JPL
198125	2004 TV_{17}	—	October 12, 2004	Moletai	K. Černis, Zdanavicius, J.	·	2.4 km	MPC · JPL
198126	2004 TS_{18}	—	October 14, 2004	Goodricke-Pigott	R. A. Tucker	·	1.7 km	MPC · JPL
198127	2004 TE_{23}	—	October 4, 2004	Kitt Peak	Spacewatch	·	1.7 km	MPC · JPL
198128	2004 TS_{25}	—	October 4, 2004	Kitt Peak	Spacewatch	·	1.3 km	MPC · JPL
198129	2004 TG_{28}	—	October 4, 2004	Kitt Peak	Spacewatch	·	2.1 km	MPC · JPL
198130	2004 TZ_{30}	—	October 4, 2004	Anderson Mesa	LONEOS	·	1.8 km	MPC · JPL
198131	2004 TS_{31}	—	October 4, 2004	Anderson Mesa	LONEOS	·	3.3 km	MPC · JPL
198132	2004 TQ_{32}	—	October 4, 2004	Kitt Peak	Spacewatch	·	2.2 km	MPC · JPL
198133	2004 TX_{33}	—	October 4, 2004	Anderson Mesa	LONEOS	·	1.7 km	MPC · JPL
198134	2004 TT_{34}	—	October 4, 2004	Anderson Mesa	LONEOS	·	2.6 km	MPC · JPL
198135	2004 TK_{35}	—	October 4, 2004	Kitt Peak	Spacewatch	·	2.5 km	MPC · JPL
198136	2004 TX_{35}	—	October 4, 2004	Kitt Peak	Spacewatch	(5)	1.5 km	MPC · JPL
198137	2004 TT_{36}	—	October 4, 2004	Kitt Peak	Spacewatch	·	2.2 km	MPC · JPL
198138	2004 TW_{37}	—	October 4, 2004	Kitt Peak	Spacewatch	·	2.0 km	MPC · JPL
198139	2004 TT_{38}	—	October 4, 2004	Kitt Peak	Spacewatch	·	1.5 km	MPC · JPL
198140	2004 TB_{39}	—	October 4, 2004	Kitt Peak	Spacewatch	NYS	1.3 km	MPC · JPL
198141	2004 TB_{40}	—	October 4, 2004	Kitt Peak	Spacewatch	NYS	2.0 km	MPC · JPL
198142	2004 TF_{42}	—	October 4, 2004	Kitt Peak	Spacewatch	(5)	1.6 km	MPC · JPL
198143	2004 TA_{46}	—	October 4, 2004	Kitt Peak	Spacewatch	·	1.5 km	MPC · JPL
198144	2004 TK_{46}	—	October 4, 2004	Kitt Peak	Spacewatch	·	1.4 km	MPC · JPL
198145	2004 TC_{48}	—	October 4, 2004	Kitt Peak	Spacewatch	(5)	2.4 km	MPC · JPL
198146	2004 TE_{50}	—	October 4, 2004	Kitt Peak	Spacewatch	·	2.0 km	MPC · JPL
198147	2004 TR_{51}	—	October 4, 2004	Kitt Peak	Spacewatch	·	2.2 km	MPC · JPL
198148	2004 TY_{52}	—	October 4, 2004	Kitt Peak	Spacewatch	·	1.6 km	MPC · JPL
198149	2004 TL_{53}	—	October 4, 2004	Kitt Peak	Spacewatch	·	3.2 km	MPC · JPL
198150	2004 TM_{53}	—	October 4, 2004	Kitt Peak	Spacewatch	·	2.0 km	MPC · JPL
198151	2004 TN_{53}	—	October 4, 2004	Kitt Peak	Spacewatch	·	1.6 km	MPC · JPL
198152	2004 TY_{53}	—	October 4, 2004	Kitt Peak	Spacewatch	·	1.8 km	MPC · JPL
198153	2004 TD_{55}	—	October 4, 2004	Kitt Peak	Spacewatch	·	2.7 km	MPC · JPL
198154	2004 TJ_{55}	—	October 4, 2004	Kitt Peak	Spacewatch	·	1.7 km	MPC · JPL
198155	2004 TD_{61}	—	October 5, 2004	Anderson Mesa	LONEOS	V	990 m	MPC · JPL
198156	2004 TB_{66}	—	October 5, 2004	Anderson Mesa	LONEOS	NYS	1.5 km	MPC · JPL
198157	2004 TM_{66}	—	October 5, 2004	Anderson Mesa	LONEOS	·	3.8 km	MPC · JPL
198158	2004 TP_{69}	—	October 5, 2004	Anderson Mesa	LONEOS	(5)	2.2 km	MPC · JPL
198159	2004 TA_{71}	—	October 6, 2004	Kitt Peak	Spacewatch	·	1.8 km	MPC · JPL
198160	2004 TR_{71}	—	October 6, 2004	Kitt Peak	Spacewatch	·	1.3 km	MPC · JPL
198161	2004 TR_{72}	—	October 6, 2004	Kitt Peak	Spacewatch	MAS	1.2 km	MPC · JPL
198162	2004 TG_{73}	—	October 6, 2004	Kitt Peak	Spacewatch	·	2.9 km	MPC · JPL
198163	2004 TS_{73}	—	October 6, 2004	Kitt Peak	Spacewatch	·	2.3 km	MPC · JPL
198164	2004 TZ_{73}	—	October 6, 2004	Kitt Peak	Spacewatch	(5)	1.5 km	MPC · JPL
198165	2004 TZ_{75}	—	October 6, 2004	Palomar	NEAT	·	2.3 km	MPC · JPL
198166	2004 TP_{77}	—	October 7, 2004	Kitt Peak	Spacewatch	·	1.7 km	MPC · JPL
198167	2004 TO_{79}	—	October 4, 2004	Kitt Peak	Spacewatch	·	1.8 km	MPC · JPL
198168	2004 TM_{81}	—	October 5, 2004	Kitt Peak	Spacewatch	(5)	1.4 km	MPC · JPL
198169	2004 TM_{86}	—	October 5, 2004	Kitt Peak	Spacewatch	·	1.2 km	MPC · JPL
198170	2004 TQ_{90}	—	October 5, 2004	Kitt Peak	Spacewatch	·	1.7 km	MPC · JPL
198171	2004 TA_{92}	—	October 5, 2004	Kitt Peak	Spacewatch	·	1.5 km	MPC · JPL
198172	2004 TF_{93}	—	October 5, 2004	Kitt Peak	Spacewatch	MAS	1.2 km	MPC · JPL
198173	2004 TV_{97}	—	October 5, 2004	Kitt Peak	Spacewatch	·	1.8 km	MPC · JPL
198174	2004 TY_{101}	—	October 6, 2004	Kitt Peak	Spacewatch	·	2.7 km	MPC · JPL
198175	2004 TG_{103}	—	October 6, 2004	Palomar	NEAT	·	2.6 km	MPC · JPL
198176	2004 TK_{103}	—	October 6, 2004	Palomar	NEAT	KRM	5.0 km	MPC · JPL
198177	2004 TL_{103}	—	October 7, 2004	Anderson Mesa	LONEOS	·	3.6 km	MPC · JPL
198178	2004 TL_{104}	—	October 7, 2004	Anderson Mesa	LONEOS	·	2.3 km	MPC · JPL
198179	2004 TJ_{106}	—	October 7, 2004	Socorro	LINEAR	·	2.2 km	MPC · JPL
198180	2004 TH_{107}	—	October 7, 2004	Socorro	LINEAR	MAR	1.4 km	MPC · JPL
198181	2004 TE_{108}	—	October 7, 2004	Socorro	LINEAR	·	1.9 km	MPC · JPL
198182	2004 TR_{108}	—	October 7, 2004	Socorro	LINEAR	·	2.9 km	MPC · JPL
198183	2004 TD_{109}	—	October 7, 2004	Anderson Mesa	LONEOS	·	2.2 km	MPC · JPL
198184	2004 TU_{109}	—	October 7, 2004	Socorro	LINEAR	EUN	5.1 km	MPC · JPL
198185	2004 TC_{114}	—	October 7, 2004	Palomar	NEAT	(5)	2.3 km	MPC · JPL
198186	2004 TE_{114}	—	October 7, 2004	Palomar	NEAT	·	2.3 km	MPC · JPL
198187	2004 TM_{124}	—	October 7, 2004	Socorro	LINEAR	·	2.5 km	MPC · JPL
198188	2004 TC_{125}	—	October 7, 2004	Socorro	LINEAR	·	2.5 km	MPC · JPL
198189	2004 TG_{125}	—	October 7, 2004	Socorro	LINEAR	·	1.3 km	MPC · JPL
198190	2004 TD_{126}	—	October 7, 2004	Socorro	LINEAR	·	1.5 km	MPC · JPL
198191	2004 TU_{127}	—	October 7, 2004	Socorro	LINEAR	·	1.7 km	MPC · JPL
198192	2004 TR_{128}	—	October 7, 2004	Socorro	LINEAR	·	1.5 km	MPC · JPL
198193	2004 TK_{129}	—	October 7, 2004	Socorro	LINEAR	·	1.6 km	MPC · JPL
198194	2004 TH_{131}	—	October 7, 2004	Anderson Mesa	LONEOS	·	1.3 km	MPC · JPL
198195	2004 TY_{133}	—	October 7, 2004	Palomar	NEAT	·	2.8 km	MPC · JPL
198196	2004 TY_{136}	—	October 8, 2004	Anderson Mesa	LONEOS	·	3.3 km	MPC · JPL
198197	2004 TO_{137}	—	October 8, 2004	Anderson Mesa	LONEOS	·	2.1 km	MPC · JPL
198198	2004 TZ_{137}	—	October 8, 2004	Anderson Mesa	LONEOS	·	1.7 km	MPC · JPL
198199	2004 TA_{138}	—	October 8, 2004	Anderson Mesa	LONEOS	EUN	1.6 km	MPC · JPL
198200	2004 TX_{138}	—	October 9, 2004	Anderson Mesa	LONEOS	·	3.7 km	MPC · JPL

== 198201–198300 ==
back to top

Designation			Discovery			Properties		Ref
Permanent	Provisional	Named after	Date	Site	Discoverer(s)	Category	Diam.	Ref
198201	2004 TY_{141}	—	October 4, 2004	Kitt Peak	Spacewatch	·	2.0 km	MPC · JPL
198202	2004 TE_{142}	—	October 4, 2004	Kitt Peak	Spacewatch	AGN	1.8 km	MPC · JPL
198203	2004 TL_{142}	—	October 4, 2004	Kitt Peak	Spacewatch	(29841)	1.6 km	MPC · JPL
198204	2004 TH_{144}	—	October 4, 2004	Kitt Peak	Spacewatch	EUN	2.1 km	MPC · JPL
198205	2004 TM_{149}	—	October 6, 2004	Kitt Peak	Spacewatch	·	1.8 km	MPC · JPL
198206	2004 TH_{150}	—	October 6, 2004	Kitt Peak	Spacewatch	NYS	1.4 km	MPC · JPL
198207	2004 TZ_{150}	—	October 6, 2004	Kitt Peak	Spacewatch	·	1.6 km	MPC · JPL
198208	2004 TV_{156}	—	October 6, 2004	Kitt Peak	Spacewatch	·	1.3 km	MPC · JPL
198209	2004 TE_{160}	—	October 6, 2004	Kitt Peak	Spacewatch	EUN	2.1 km	MPC · JPL
198210	2004 TF_{163}	—	October 6, 2004	Kitt Peak	Spacewatch	·	2.0 km	MPC · JPL
198211	2004 TN_{164}	—	October 6, 2004	Kitt Peak	Spacewatch	EUN	2.0 km	MPC · JPL
198212	2004 TU_{165}	—	October 7, 2004	Kitt Peak	Spacewatch	·	1.5 km	MPC · JPL
198213	2004 TE_{166}	—	October 7, 2004	Kitt Peak	Spacewatch	·	1.4 km	MPC · JPL
198214	2004 TQ_{167}	—	October 7, 2004	Kitt Peak	Spacewatch	·	1.9 km	MPC · JPL
198215	2004 TR_{167}	—	October 7, 2004	Kitt Peak	Spacewatch	·	1.5 km	MPC · JPL
198216	2004 TY_{168}	—	October 7, 2004	Socorro	LINEAR	·	1.8 km	MPC · JPL
198217	2004 TS_{171}	—	October 8, 2004	Socorro	LINEAR	·	3.0 km	MPC · JPL
198218	2004 TZ_{173}	—	October 8, 2004	Socorro	LINEAR	·	4.4 km	MPC · JPL
198219	2004 TM_{175}	—	October 9, 2004	Socorro	LINEAR	(5)	1.4 km	MPC · JPL
198220	2004 TQ_{175}	—	October 9, 2004	Socorro	LINEAR	·	1.4 km	MPC · JPL
198221	2004 TK_{176}	—	October 9, 2004	Socorro	LINEAR	·	2.9 km	MPC · JPL
198222	2004 TL_{176}	—	October 9, 2004	Socorro	LINEAR	·	2.1 km	MPC · JPL
198223	2004 TL_{180}	—	October 7, 2004	Kitt Peak	Spacewatch	NYS	1.2 km	MPC · JPL
198224	2004 TX_{180}	—	October 7, 2004	Kitt Peak	Spacewatch	·	1.3 km	MPC · JPL
198225	2004 TR_{182}	—	October 7, 2004	Kitt Peak	Spacewatch	·	2.4 km	MPC · JPL
198226	2004 TF_{184}	—	October 7, 2004	Kitt Peak	Spacewatch	(5)	1.5 km	MPC · JPL
198227	2004 TE_{186}	—	October 7, 2004	Kitt Peak	Spacewatch	·	1.9 km	MPC · JPL
198228	2004 TO_{186}	—	October 7, 2004	Kitt Peak	Spacewatch	·	2.2 km	MPC · JPL
198229	2004 TV_{186}	—	October 7, 2004	Kitt Peak	Spacewatch	NYS	1.4 km	MPC · JPL
198230	2004 TW_{188}	—	October 7, 2004	Kitt Peak	Spacewatch	V	1.2 km	MPC · JPL
198231	2004 TY_{194}	—	October 7, 2004	Kitt Peak	Spacewatch	(5)	1.9 km	MPC · JPL
198232	2004 TU_{195}	—	October 7, 2004	Kitt Peak	Spacewatch	·	1.4 km	MPC · JPL
198233	2004 TY_{195}	—	October 7, 2004	Kitt Peak	Spacewatch	(5)	1.3 km	MPC · JPL
198234	2004 TN_{198}	—	October 7, 2004	Kitt Peak	Spacewatch	(5)	1.7 km	MPC · JPL
198235	2004 TU_{202}	—	October 7, 2004	Kitt Peak	Spacewatch	·	3.4 km	MPC · JPL
198236	2004 TW_{202}	—	October 7, 2004	Kitt Peak	Spacewatch	(5)	1.4 km	MPC · JPL
198237	2004 TR_{203}	—	October 7, 2004	Kitt Peak	Spacewatch	·	3.6 km	MPC · JPL
198238	2004 TB_{204}	—	October 7, 2004	Kitt Peak	Spacewatch	·	3.3 km	MPC · JPL
198239	2004 TE_{204}	—	October 7, 2004	Kitt Peak	Spacewatch	·	2.5 km	MPC · JPL
198240	2004 TR_{204}	—	October 7, 2004	Kitt Peak	Spacewatch	·	1.7 km	MPC · JPL
198241	2004 TU_{204}	—	October 7, 2004	Kitt Peak	Spacewatch	·	2.3 km	MPC · JPL
198242	2004 TV_{204}	—	October 7, 2004	Kitt Peak	Spacewatch	·	1.9 km	MPC · JPL
198243	2004 TN_{206}	—	October 7, 2004	Kitt Peak	Spacewatch	·	2.1 km	MPC · JPL
198244	2004 TS_{206}	—	October 7, 2004	Kitt Peak	Spacewatch	·	2.4 km	MPC · JPL
198245	2004 TB_{209}	—	October 8, 2004	Kitt Peak	Spacewatch	·	1.5 km	MPC · JPL
198246	2004 TS_{211}	—	October 8, 2004	Kitt Peak	Spacewatch	·	2.1 km	MPC · JPL
198247	2004 TP_{213}	—	October 9, 2004	Kitt Peak	Spacewatch	EUN	1.9 km	MPC · JPL
198248	2004 TB_{214}	—	October 9, 2004	Kitt Peak	Spacewatch	(5)	1.5 km	MPC · JPL
198249	2004 TA_{216}	—	October 6, 2004	Kitt Peak	Spacewatch	·	2.1 km	MPC · JPL
198250	2004 TS_{216}	—	October 3, 2004	Palomar	NEAT	·	2.4 km	MPC · JPL
198251	2004 TV_{218}	—	October 5, 2004	Kitt Peak	Spacewatch	·	2.2 km	MPC · JPL
198252	2004 TD_{222}	—	October 7, 2004	Socorro	LINEAR	·	2.5 km	MPC · JPL
198253	2004 TE_{222}	—	October 7, 2004	Socorro	LINEAR	·	3.6 km	MPC · JPL
198254	2004 TJ_{224}	—	October 8, 2004	Kitt Peak	Spacewatch	·	1.1 km	MPC · JPL
198255	2004 TK_{224}	—	October 8, 2004	Kitt Peak	Spacewatch	·	1.3 km	MPC · JPL
198256	2004 TY_{228}	—	October 8, 2004	Kitt Peak	Spacewatch	·	1.6 km	MPC · JPL
198257	2004 TQ_{229}	—	October 8, 2004	Kitt Peak	Spacewatch	·	1.8 km	MPC · JPL
198258	2004 TX_{238}	—	October 9, 2004	Kitt Peak	Spacewatch	·	2.0 km	MPC · JPL
198259	2004 TN_{242}	—	October 6, 2004	Socorro	LINEAR	·	2.4 km	MPC · JPL
198260	2004 TZ_{242}	—	October 6, 2004	Socorro	LINEAR	EUN	1.8 km	MPC · JPL
198261	2004 TJ_{243}	—	October 6, 2004	Kitt Peak	Spacewatch	(5)	1.6 km	MPC · JPL
198262	2004 TS_{247}	—	October 7, 2004	Socorro	LINEAR	EUN	1.8 km	MPC · JPL
198263	2004 TW_{249}	—	October 7, 2004	Socorro	LINEAR	·	3.0 km	MPC · JPL
198264	2004 TB_{257}	—	October 9, 2004	Socorro	LINEAR	MAR	1.5 km	MPC · JPL
198265	2004 TH_{261}	—	October 9, 2004	Kitt Peak	Spacewatch	·	1.3 km	MPC · JPL
198266	2004 TT_{262}	—	October 9, 2004	Socorro	LINEAR	·	5.0 km	MPC · JPL
198267	2004 TV_{263}	—	October 9, 2004	Kitt Peak	Spacewatch	·	2.4 km	MPC · JPL
198268	2004 TK_{264}	—	October 9, 2004	Kitt Peak	Spacewatch	·	2.9 km	MPC · JPL
198269	2004 TQ_{264}	—	October 9, 2004	Kitt Peak	Spacewatch	·	1.9 km	MPC · JPL
198270	2004 TU_{264}	—	October 9, 2004	Kitt Peak	Spacewatch	·	1.7 km	MPC · JPL
198271	2004 TG_{265}	—	October 9, 2004	Kitt Peak	Spacewatch	·	1.8 km	MPC · JPL
198272	2004 TV_{266}	—	October 9, 2004	Kitt Peak	Spacewatch	NYS	1.9 km	MPC · JPL
198273	2004 TW_{266}	—	October 9, 2004	Kitt Peak	Spacewatch	·	2.0 km	MPC · JPL
198274	2004 TM_{270}	—	October 9, 2004	Kitt Peak	Spacewatch	MAS	1.1 km	MPC · JPL
198275	2004 TE_{274}	—	October 9, 2004	Kitt Peak	Spacewatch	·	4.1 km	MPC · JPL
198276	2004 TC_{276}	—	October 9, 2004	Kitt Peak	Spacewatch	·	3.0 km	MPC · JPL
198277	2004 TD_{276}	—	October 9, 2004	Kitt Peak	Spacewatch	(5)	2.2 km	MPC · JPL
198278	2004 TR_{282}	—	October 7, 2004	Socorro	LINEAR	NEM	2.5 km	MPC · JPL
198279	2004 TB_{290}	—	October 10, 2004	Kitt Peak	Spacewatch	·	1.9 km	MPC · JPL
198280	2004 TU_{293}	—	October 10, 2004	Kitt Peak	Spacewatch	·	1.6 km	MPC · JPL
198281	2004 TW_{293}	—	October 10, 2004	Kitt Peak	Spacewatch	·	1.2 km	MPC · JPL
198282	2004 TR_{295}	—	October 10, 2004	Kitt Peak	Spacewatch	·	2.1 km	MPC · JPL
198283	2004 TM_{296}	—	October 10, 2004	Kitt Peak	Spacewatch	·	2.7 km	MPC · JPL
198284	2004 TM_{297}	—	October 11, 2004	Kitt Peak	Spacewatch	·	3.2 km	MPC · JPL
198285	2004 TT_{297}	—	October 12, 2004	Anderson Mesa	LONEOS	·	3.8 km	MPC · JPL
198286	2004 TF_{298}	—	October 12, 2004	Anderson Mesa	LONEOS	·	3.3 km	MPC · JPL
198287	2004 TK_{298}	—	October 13, 2004	Kitt Peak	Spacewatch	·	1.3 km	MPC · JPL
198288	2004 TF_{299}	—	October 8, 2004	Socorro	LINEAR	·	2.7 km	MPC · JPL
198289	2004 TT_{300}	—	October 8, 2004	Socorro	LINEAR	DOR	4.6 km	MPC · JPL
198290	2004 TW_{301}	—	October 8, 2004	Socorro	LINEAR	·	2.3 km	MPC · JPL
198291	2004 TO_{302}	—	October 9, 2004	Socorro	LINEAR	·	2.1 km	MPC · JPL
198292	2004 TF_{307}	—	October 10, 2004	Socorro	LINEAR	EUN	2.0 km	MPC · JPL
198293	2004 TW_{307}	—	October 10, 2004	Socorro	LINEAR	·	1.8 km	MPC · JPL
198294	2004 TB_{308}	—	October 10, 2004	Socorro	LINEAR	WIT	1.5 km	MPC · JPL
198295	2004 TY_{308}	—	October 10, 2004	Socorro	LINEAR	ADE	2.7 km	MPC · JPL
198296	2004 TK_{309}	—	October 10, 2004	Socorro	LINEAR	·	1.5 km	MPC · JPL
198297	2004 TR_{314}	—	October 11, 2004	Kitt Peak	Spacewatch	·	1.5 km	MPC · JPL
198298	2004 TH_{318}	—	October 11, 2004	Kitt Peak	Spacewatch	·	3.2 km	MPC · JPL
198299	2004 TE_{320}	—	October 11, 2004	Kitt Peak	Spacewatch	·	1.7 km	MPC · JPL
198300	2004 TQ_{323}	—	October 11, 2004	Kitt Peak	Spacewatch	·	1.7 km	MPC · JPL

== 198301–198400 ==
back to top

Designation			Discovery			Properties		Ref
Permanent	Provisional	Named after	Date	Site	Discoverer(s)	Category	Diam.	Ref
198301	2004 TR_{323}	—	October 11, 2004	Kitt Peak	Spacewatch	AST	3.6 km	MPC · JPL
198302	2004 TW_{324}	—	October 12, 2004	Kitt Peak	Spacewatch	·	2.1 km	MPC · JPL
198303	2004 TX_{324}	—	October 12, 2004	Kitt Peak	Spacewatch	·	2.5 km	MPC · JPL
198304	2004 TC_{325}	—	October 12, 2004	Kitt Peak	Spacewatch	·	2.0 km	MPC · JPL
198305	2004 TK_{328}	—	October 4, 2004	Palomar	NEAT	·	1.5 km	MPC · JPL
198306	2004 TX_{328}	—	October 4, 2004	Palomar	NEAT	·	3.5 km	MPC · JPL
198307	2004 TT_{330}	—	October 9, 2004	Socorro	LINEAR	·	2.8 km	MPC · JPL
198308	2004 TQ_{332}	—	October 9, 2004	Kitt Peak	Spacewatch	·	2.3 km	MPC · JPL
198309	2004 TW_{333}	—	October 9, 2004	Kitt Peak	Spacewatch	·	2.9 km	MPC · JPL
198310	2004 TX_{333}	—	October 9, 2004	Kitt Peak	Spacewatch	·	1.7 km	MPC · JPL
198311	2004 TS_{335}	—	October 10, 2004	Kitt Peak	Spacewatch	·	1.4 km	MPC · JPL
198312	2004 TZ_{335}	—	October 10, 2004	Kitt Peak	Spacewatch	·	2.8 km	MPC · JPL
198313	2004 TE_{336}	—	October 10, 2004	Kitt Peak	Spacewatch	·	1.9 km	MPC · JPL
198314	2004 TN_{336}	—	October 10, 2004	Kitt Peak	Spacewatch	·	2.2 km	MPC · JPL
198315	2004 TC_{339}	—	October 12, 2004	Anderson Mesa	LONEOS	·	3.3 km	MPC · JPL
198316	2004 TU_{339}	—	October 13, 2004	Kitt Peak	Spacewatch	·	1.2 km	MPC · JPL
198317	2004 TX_{339}	—	October 13, 2004	Kitt Peak	Spacewatch	·	2.2 km	MPC · JPL
198318	2004 TJ_{342}	—	October 13, 2004	Kitt Peak	Spacewatch	·	1.9 km	MPC · JPL
198319	2004 TW_{342}	—	October 13, 2004	Kitt Peak	Spacewatch	·	2.1 km	MPC · JPL
198320	2004 TY_{346}	—	October 15, 2004	Anderson Mesa	LONEOS	(5)	1.7 km	MPC · JPL
198321	2004 TO_{348}	—	October 7, 2004	Kitt Peak	Spacewatch	·	2.3 km	MPC · JPL
198322	2004 TT_{349}	—	October 9, 2004	Socorro	LINEAR	·	2.2 km	MPC · JPL
198323	2004 TE_{355}	—	October 7, 2004	Socorro	LINEAR	·	2.2 km	MPC · JPL
198324	2004 TG_{355}	—	October 7, 2004	Socorro	LINEAR	V	920 m	MPC · JPL
198325	2004 TM_{356}	—	October 14, 2004	Anderson Mesa	LONEOS	PHO	3.2 km	MPC · JPL
198326	2004 TX_{358}	—	October 6, 2004	Kitt Peak	Spacewatch	·	1.4 km	MPC · JPL
198327	2004 TR_{359}	—	October 9, 2004	Socorro	LINEAR	·	2.8 km	MPC · JPL
198328	2004 TC_{361}	—	October 12, 2004	Kitt Peak	Spacewatch	·	2.5 km	MPC · JPL
198329	2004 TJ_{361}	—	October 13, 2004	Socorro	LINEAR	·	1.7 km	MPC · JPL
198330	2004 TJ_{366}	—	October 9, 2004	Kitt Peak	Spacewatch	·	2.1 km	MPC · JPL
198331	2004 TS_{366}	—	October 9, 2004	Kitt Peak	Spacewatch	·	1.2 km	MPC · JPL
198332	2004 TZ_{367}	—	October 6, 2004	Kitt Peak	Spacewatch	·	1.6 km	MPC · JPL
198333	2004 UA	—	October 16, 2004	Pla D'Arguines	R. Ferrando	·	2.5 km	MPC · JPL
198334	2004 UQ_{1}	—	October 23, 2004	Socorro	LINEAR	·	2.1 km	MPC · JPL
198335	2004 UP_{2}	—	October 18, 2004	Socorro	LINEAR	·	2.2 km	MPC · JPL
198336	2004 UR_{3}	—	October 19, 2004	Socorro	LINEAR	·	2.2 km	MPC · JPL
198337	2004 UE_{4}	—	October 16, 2004	Socorro	LINEAR	·	4.3 km	MPC · JPL
198338	2004 UB_{5}	—	October 18, 2004	Socorro	LINEAR	(5)	2.1 km	MPC · JPL
198339	2004 UW_{5}	—	October 20, 2004	Socorro	LINEAR	·	3.4 km	MPC · JPL
198340	2004 UO_{6}	—	October 20, 2004	Socorro	LINEAR	·	1.8 km	MPC · JPL
198341	2004 UR_{8}	—	October 21, 2004	Socorro	LINEAR	·	1.5 km	MPC · JPL
198342	2004 UC_{9}	—	October 23, 2004	Socorro	LINEAR	·	6.1 km	MPC · JPL
198343	2004 VG	—	November 2, 2004	Palomar	NEAT	ADE	4.2 km	MPC · JPL
198344	2004 VU	—	November 2, 2004	Anderson Mesa	LONEOS	·	3.6 km	MPC · JPL
198345	2004 VM_{2}	—	November 3, 2004	Palomar	NEAT	·	2.1 km	MPC · JPL
198346	2004 VL_{3}	—	November 3, 2004	Kitt Peak	Spacewatch	·	2.0 km	MPC · JPL
198347	2004 VZ_{4}	—	November 3, 2004	Anderson Mesa	LONEOS	·	2.9 km	MPC · JPL
198348	2004 VA_{5}	—	November 3, 2004	Anderson Mesa	LONEOS	EUN	2.3 km	MPC · JPL
198349	2004 VD_{5}	—	November 3, 2004	Anderson Mesa	LONEOS	MAR	1.8 km	MPC · JPL
198350	2004 VA_{6}	—	November 3, 2004	Palomar	NEAT	·	1.5 km	MPC · JPL
198351	2004 VD_{6}	—	November 3, 2004	Kitt Peak	Spacewatch	·	4.4 km	MPC · JPL
198352	2004 VZ_{6}	—	November 3, 2004	Kitt Peak	Spacewatch	·	2.0 km	MPC · JPL
198353	2004 VL_{8}	—	November 3, 2004	Anderson Mesa	LONEOS	·	3.4 km	MPC · JPL
198354	2004 VM_{8}	—	November 3, 2004	Anderson Mesa	LONEOS	·	1.9 km	MPC · JPL
198355	2004 VZ_{9}	—	November 3, 2004	Anderson Mesa	LONEOS	·	3.8 km	MPC · JPL
198356	2004 VC_{10}	—	November 3, 2004	Anderson Mesa	LONEOS	(5)	2.8 km	MPC · JPL
198357	2004 VG_{10}	—	November 3, 2004	Palomar	NEAT	·	2.3 km	MPC · JPL
198358	2004 VR_{10}	—	November 3, 2004	Catalina	CSS	·	2.6 km	MPC · JPL
198359	2004 VS_{12}	—	November 3, 2004	Catalina	CSS	·	2.6 km	MPC · JPL
198360	2004 VX_{12}	—	November 3, 2004	Palomar	NEAT	·	1.9 km	MPC · JPL
198361	2004 VF_{13}	—	November 3, 2004	Palomar	NEAT	·	2.9 km	MPC · JPL
198362	2004 VW_{13}	—	November 3, 2004	Palomar	NEAT	·	2.2 km	MPC · JPL
198363	2004 VF_{14}	—	November 4, 2004	Anderson Mesa	LONEOS	·	2.5 km	MPC · JPL
198364	2004 VM_{14}	—	November 4, 2004	Kitt Peak	Spacewatch	NYS	1.5 km	MPC · JPL
198365	2004 VJ_{15}	—	November 5, 2004	Needville	J. Dellinger, Lowe, A.	·	1.9 km	MPC · JPL
198366	2004 VZ_{16}	—	November 4, 2004	Catalina	CSS	MAR	1.5 km	MPC · JPL
198367	2004 VP_{18}	—	November 4, 2004	Kitt Peak	Spacewatch	·	2.1 km	MPC · JPL
198368	2004 VV_{18}	—	November 4, 2004	Kitt Peak	Spacewatch	·	2.4 km	MPC · JPL
198369	2004 VR_{19}	—	November 4, 2004	Anderson Mesa	LONEOS	MAR	2.0 km	MPC · JPL
198370	2004 VS_{19}	—	November 4, 2004	Anderson Mesa	LONEOS	·	2.3 km	MPC · JPL
198371	2004 VQ_{20}	—	November 4, 2004	Catalina	CSS	·	4.4 km	MPC · JPL
198372	2004 VE_{21}	—	November 4, 2004	Catalina	CSS	·	1.8 km	MPC · JPL
198373	2004 VZ_{21}	—	November 4, 2004	Catalina	CSS	MIS	3.6 km	MPC · JPL
198374	2004 VA_{22}	—	November 4, 2004	Catalina	CSS	(5)	2.0 km	MPC · JPL
198375	2004 VG_{23}	—	November 5, 2004	Palomar	NEAT	MIS	3.1 km	MPC · JPL
198376	2004 VB_{24}	—	November 5, 2004	Anderson Mesa	LONEOS	EUN	2.1 km	MPC · JPL
198377	2004 VQ_{25}	—	November 4, 2004	Catalina	CSS	·	2.0 km	MPC · JPL
198378	2004 VP_{27}	—	November 5, 2004	Palomar	NEAT	MAR	1.6 km	MPC · JPL
198379	2004 VJ_{28}	—	November 7, 2004	Socorro	LINEAR	·	2.1 km	MPC · JPL
198380	2004 VT_{28}	—	November 8, 2004	Antares	R. Holmes	·	4.0 km	MPC · JPL
198381	2004 VB_{29}	—	November 3, 2004	Kitt Peak	Spacewatch	·	1.7 km	MPC · JPL
198382	2004 VM_{29}	—	November 3, 2004	Kitt Peak	Spacewatch	·	1.6 km	MPC · JPL
198383	2004 VR_{29}	—	November 3, 2004	Kitt Peak	Spacewatch	·	2.1 km	MPC · JPL
198384	2004 VD_{30}	—	November 3, 2004	Kitt Peak	Spacewatch	·	2.3 km	MPC · JPL
198385	2004 VW_{32}	—	November 3, 2004	Kitt Peak	Spacewatch	·	2.7 km	MPC · JPL
198386	2004 VB_{33}	—	November 3, 2004	Kitt Peak	Spacewatch	·	2.7 km	MPC · JPL
198387	2004 VL_{33}	—	November 3, 2004	Kitt Peak	Spacewatch	·	1.9 km	MPC · JPL
198388	2004 VQ_{33}	—	November 3, 2004	Kitt Peak	Spacewatch	·	2.1 km	MPC · JPL
198389	2004 VH_{34}	—	November 3, 2004	Kitt Peak	Spacewatch	(5)	1.6 km	MPC · JPL
198390	2004 VW_{38}	—	November 4, 2004	Kitt Peak	Spacewatch	·	3.6 km	MPC · JPL
198391	2004 VQ_{40}	—	November 4, 2004	Kitt Peak	Spacewatch	·	2.8 km	MPC · JPL
198392	2004 VE_{43}	—	November 4, 2004	Kitt Peak	Spacewatch	NYS	1.7 km	MPC · JPL
198393	2004 VE_{44}	—	November 4, 2004	Kitt Peak	Spacewatch	·	2.0 km	MPC · JPL
198394	2004 VF_{44}	—	November 4, 2004	Kitt Peak	Spacewatch	·	2.3 km	MPC · JPL
198395	2004 VL_{47}	—	November 4, 2004	Kitt Peak	Spacewatch	·	1.7 km	MPC · JPL
198396	2004 VV_{51}	—	November 4, 2004	Kitt Peak	Spacewatch	(5)	1.9 km	MPC · JPL
198397	2004 VG_{52}	—	November 4, 2004	Catalina	CSS	·	2.4 km	MPC · JPL
198398	2004 VR_{52}	—	November 4, 2004	Catalina	CSS	·	4.3 km	MPC · JPL
198399	2004 VT_{52}	—	November 4, 2004	Catalina	CSS	·	3.1 km	MPC · JPL
198400	2004 VA_{53}	—	November 5, 2004	Campo Imperatore	CINEOS	·	1.8 km	MPC · JPL

== 198401–198500 ==
back to top

Designation			Discovery			Properties		Ref
Permanent	Provisional	Named after	Date	Site	Discoverer(s)	Category	Diam.	Ref
198401	2004 VB_{53}	—	November 5, 2004	Campo Imperatore	CINEOS	·	2.2 km	MPC · JPL
198402	2004 VL_{54}	—	November 4, 2004	Socorro	LINEAR	·	2.8 km	MPC · JPL
198403	2004 VA_{55}	—	November 9, 2004	Goodricke-Pigott	R. A. Tucker	·	3.4 km	MPC · JPL
198404	2004 VW_{56}	—	November 4, 2004	Catalina	CSS	·	2.0 km	MPC · JPL
198405	2004 VY_{56}	—	November 4, 2004	Catalina	CSS	NEM	3.0 km	MPC · JPL
198406	2004 VZ_{56}	—	November 4, 2004	Catalina	CSS	·	2.7 km	MPC · JPL
198407	2004 VG_{58}	—	November 9, 2004	Catalina	CSS	·	3.2 km	MPC · JPL
198408	2004 VT_{59}	—	November 9, 2004	Catalina	CSS	·	2.0 km	MPC · JPL
198409	2004 VF_{62}	—	November 6, 2004	Socorro	LINEAR	·	1.6 km	MPC · JPL
198410	2004 VN_{62}	—	November 6, 2004	Socorro	LINEAR	fast	2.3 km	MPC · JPL
198411	2004 VB_{63}	—	November 7, 2004	Socorro	LINEAR	·	1.5 km	MPC · JPL
198412	2004 VD_{63}	—	November 7, 2004	Socorro	LINEAR	·	2.2 km	MPC · JPL
198413	2004 VP_{63}	—	November 10, 2004	Kitt Peak	Spacewatch	NYS	1.9 km	MPC · JPL
198414	2004 VJ_{65}	—	November 10, 2004	Cordell-Lorenz	D. T. Durig, Mathison, M. A.	·	2.2 km	MPC · JPL
198415	2004 VE_{70}	—	November 3, 2004	Catalina	CSS	·	3.2 km	MPC · JPL
198416	2004 VU_{70}	—	November 7, 2004	Socorro	LINEAR	·	2.6 km	MPC · JPL
198417	2004 VF_{71}	—	November 9, 2004	Goodricke-Pigott	Goodricke-Pigott	·	2.0 km	MPC · JPL
198418	2004 VH_{72}	—	November 4, 2004	Anderson Mesa	LONEOS	EUN	2.0 km	MPC · JPL
198419	2004 VA_{73}	—	November 5, 2004	Anderson Mesa	LONEOS	·	1.7 km	MPC · JPL
198420	2004 VL_{73}	—	November 5, 2004	Anderson Mesa	LONEOS	·	2.5 km	MPC · JPL
198421	2004 VM_{77}	—	November 12, 2004	Catalina	CSS	·	1.9 km	MPC · JPL
198422	2004 VV_{77}	—	November 12, 2004	Socorro	LINEAR	EUN	1.9 km	MPC · JPL
198423	2004 VK_{80}	—	November 3, 2004	Anderson Mesa	LONEOS	RAF	1.2 km	MPC · JPL
198424	2004 VL_{80}	—	November 3, 2004	Anderson Mesa	LONEOS	·	2.6 km	MPC · JPL
198425	2004 VT_{81}	—	November 4, 2004	Kitt Peak	Spacewatch	·	2.6 km	MPC · JPL
198426	2004 VR_{82}	—	November 9, 2004	Catalina	CSS	MAR	1.8 km	MPC · JPL
198427	2004 VW_{84}	—	November 10, 2004	Kitt Peak	Spacewatch	·	1.4 km	MPC · JPL
198428	2004 VX_{89}	—	November 11, 2004	Kitt Peak	Spacewatch	·	2.3 km	MPC · JPL
198429	2004 VC_{90}	—	November 11, 2004	Kitt Peak	Spacewatch	·	4.3 km	MPC · JPL
198430	2004 VB_{93}	—	November 9, 2004	Catalina	CSS	·	3.1 km	MPC · JPL
198431	2004 VG_{93}	—	November 9, 2004	Catalina	CSS	·	1.7 km	MPC · JPL
198432	2004 VL_{95}	—	November 10, 2004	Kitt Peak	Spacewatch	·	2.2 km	MPC · JPL
198433	2004 VZ_{110}	—	November 9, 2004	Mauna Kea	Veillet, C.	·	2.7 km	MPC · JPL
198434	2004 WX	—	November 17, 2004	Siding Spring	SSS	·	3.8 km	MPC · JPL
198435	2004 WN_{2}	—	November 19, 2004	Socorro	LINEAR	·	5.0 km	MPC · JPL
198436	2004 WH_{3}	—	November 17, 2004	Siding Spring	SSS	·	3.4 km	MPC · JPL
198437	2004 WV_{3}	—	November 17, 2004	Campo Imperatore	CINEOS	·	2.5 km	MPC · JPL
198438	2004 WA_{6}	—	November 19, 2004	Socorro	LINEAR	·	4.1 km	MPC · JPL
198439	2004 WT_{6}	—	November 19, 2004	Socorro	LINEAR	·	3.6 km	MPC · JPL
198440	2004 WV_{6}	—	November 19, 2004	Socorro	LINEAR	·	3.7 km	MPC · JPL
198441	2004 WK_{7}	—	November 19, 2004	Socorro	LINEAR	·	3.3 km	MPC · JPL
198442	2004 WR_{7}	—	November 19, 2004	Catalina	CSS	·	2.0 km	MPC · JPL
198443	2004 WC_{9}	—	November 19, 2004	Socorro	LINEAR	·	5.8 km	MPC · JPL
198444	2004 WX_{10}	—	November 20, 2004	Kitt Peak	Spacewatch	·	3.7 km	MPC · JPL
198445	2004 XD_{3}	—	December 3, 2004	Cordell-Lorenz	Cordell-Lorenz	ADE	4.1 km	MPC · JPL
198446	2004 XS_{3}	—	December 4, 2004	Antares	R. Holmes	·	3.4 km	MPC · JPL
198447	2004 XB_{4}	—	December 2, 2004	Catalina	CSS	·	2.4 km	MPC · JPL
198448	2004 XV_{4}	—	December 2, 2004	Catalina	CSS	·	3.9 km	MPC · JPL
198449	2004 XM_{5}	—	December 3, 2004	Palomar	NEAT	EUN	2.1 km	MPC · JPL
198450 Scattolin	2004 XG_{6}	Scattolin	December 9, 2004	Jarnac	Jarnac	GEF	1.8 km	MPC · JPL
198451	2004 XX_{6}	—	December 2, 2004	Socorro	LINEAR	PHO	1.8 km	MPC · JPL
198452	2004 XH_{8}	—	December 2, 2004	Socorro	LINEAR	·	2.5 km	MPC · JPL
198453	2004 XL_{8}	—	December 2, 2004	Palomar	NEAT	·	2.8 km	MPC · JPL
198454	2004 XP_{8}	—	December 2, 2004	Socorro	LINEAR	·	3.1 km	MPC · JPL
198455	2004 XU_{9}	—	December 2, 2004	Catalina	CSS	·	3.0 km	MPC · JPL
198456	2004 XJ_{10}	—	December 2, 2004	Palomar	NEAT	·	4.3 km	MPC · JPL
198457	2004 XK_{12}	—	December 8, 2004	Socorro	LINEAR	EUN	2.7 km	MPC · JPL
198458	2004 XN_{12}	—	December 8, 2004	Socorro	LINEAR	·	7.2 km	MPC · JPL
198459	2004 XF_{13}	—	December 8, 2004	Socorro	LINEAR	·	3.0 km	MPC · JPL
198460	2004 XA_{16}	—	December 8, 2004	Socorro	LINEAR	·	3.0 km	MPC · JPL
198461	2004 XG_{16}	—	December 9, 2004	Catalina	CSS	·	3.5 km	MPC · JPL
198462	2004 XU_{17}	—	December 7, 2004	Socorro	LINEAR	·	3.2 km	MPC · JPL
198463	2004 XT_{19}	—	December 8, 2004	Socorro	LINEAR	KOR	2.0 km	MPC · JPL
198464	2004 XP_{21}	—	December 8, 2004	Socorro	LINEAR	·	3.6 km	MPC · JPL
198465	2004 XL_{22}	—	December 8, 2004	Socorro	LINEAR	NYS	1.5 km	MPC · JPL
198466	2004 XR_{22}	—	December 8, 2004	Socorro	LINEAR	(5)	1.6 km	MPC · JPL
198467	2004 XD_{24}	—	December 9, 2004	Catalina	CSS	·	1.9 km	MPC · JPL
198468	2004 XE_{24}	—	December 9, 2004	Catalina	CSS	·	2.1 km	MPC · JPL
198469	2004 XT_{24}	—	December 9, 2004	Socorro	LINEAR	·	4.4 km	MPC · JPL
198470	2004 XW_{25}	—	December 9, 2004	Catalina	CSS	(5)	2.4 km	MPC · JPL
198471	2004 XD_{27}	—	December 10, 2004	Kitt Peak	Spacewatch	MRX	1.7 km	MPC · JPL
198472	2004 XG_{32}	—	December 10, 2004	Socorro	LINEAR	AST	3.4 km	MPC · JPL
198473	2004 XK_{33}	—	December 10, 2004	Socorro	LINEAR	·	3.1 km	MPC · JPL
198474	2004 XO_{36}	—	December 10, 2004	Socorro	LINEAR	·	2.1 km	MPC · JPL
198475	2004 XK_{37}	—	December 11, 2004	Campo Imperatore	CINEOS	·	3.7 km	MPC · JPL
198476	2004 XE_{38}	—	December 7, 2004	Socorro	LINEAR	EUN	1.8 km	MPC · JPL
198477	2004 XH_{38}	—	December 7, 2004	Socorro	LINEAR	·	2.1 km	MPC · JPL
198478	2004 XP_{38}	—	December 7, 2004	Socorro	LINEAR	HNS	1.7 km	MPC · JPL
198479	2004 XD_{39}	—	December 7, 2004	Socorro	LINEAR	EUN	2.1 km	MPC · JPL
198480	2004 XW_{40}	—	December 11, 2004	Socorro	LINEAR	·	2.2 km	MPC · JPL
198481	2004 XV_{41}	—	December 9, 2004	Bergisch Gladbach	W. Bickel	·	4.4 km	MPC · JPL
198482	2004 XK_{42}	—	December 2, 2004	Catalina	CSS	HOF	4.6 km	MPC · JPL
198483	2004 XU_{47}	—	December 9, 2004	Kitt Peak	Spacewatch	·	2.9 km	MPC · JPL
198484	2004 XS_{48}	—	December 10, 2004	Kitt Peak	Spacewatch	·	3.2 km	MPC · JPL
198485	2004 XD_{49}	—	December 11, 2004	Socorro	LINEAR	·	4.2 km	MPC · JPL
198486	2004 XV_{51}	—	December 11, 2004	Anderson Mesa	LONEOS	BAR	3.0 km	MPC · JPL
198487	2004 XP_{57}	—	December 10, 2004	Kitt Peak	Spacewatch	·	3.1 km	MPC · JPL
198488	2004 XT_{57}	—	December 10, 2004	Kitt Peak	Spacewatch	KOR	1.7 km	MPC · JPL
198489	2004 XD_{59}	—	December 10, 2004	Kitt Peak	Spacewatch	EOS	3.3 km	MPC · JPL
198490	2004 XS_{59}	—	December 11, 2004	Socorro	LINEAR	·	4.7 km	MPC · JPL
198491	2004 XD_{62}	—	December 13, 2004	Socorro	LINEAR	·	3.2 km	MPC · JPL
198492	2004 XU_{62}	—	December 10, 2004	Junk Bond	Junk Bond	·	3.3 km	MPC · JPL
198493	2004 XD_{65}	—	December 2, 2004	Catalina	CSS	·	3.0 km	MPC · JPL
198494	2004 XR_{66}	—	December 3, 2004	Kitt Peak	Spacewatch	·	2.4 km	MPC · JPL
198495	2004 XP_{69}	—	December 10, 2004	Socorro	LINEAR	·	3.1 km	MPC · JPL
198496	2004 XV_{72}	—	December 9, 2004	Catalina	CSS	·	2.2 km	MPC · JPL
198497	2004 XA_{73}	—	December 9, 2004	Catalina	CSS	·	1.8 km	MPC · JPL
198498	2004 XD_{73}	—	December 10, 2004	Socorro	LINEAR	·	1.8 km	MPC · JPL
198499	2004 XJ_{73}	—	December 10, 2004	Socorro	LINEAR	·	3.0 km	MPC · JPL
198500	2004 XN_{73}	—	December 10, 2004	Catalina	CSS	(40134)	3.4 km	MPC · JPL

== 198501–198600 ==
back to top

Designation			Discovery			Properties		Ref
Permanent	Provisional	Named after	Date	Site	Discoverer(s)	Category	Diam.	Ref
198501	2004 XN_{74}	—	December 8, 2004	Socorro	LINEAR	·	2.4 km	MPC · JPL
198502	2004 XP_{76}	—	December 10, 2004	Kitt Peak	Spacewatch	·	6.7 km	MPC · JPL
198503	2004 XC_{77}	—	December 10, 2004	Socorro	LINEAR	·	2.2 km	MPC · JPL
198504	2004 XG_{77}	—	December 10, 2004	Socorro	LINEAR	·	3.3 km	MPC · JPL
198505	2004 XP_{77}	—	December 10, 2004	Socorro	LINEAR	·	4.8 km	MPC · JPL
198506	2004 XG_{78}	—	December 10, 2004	Socorro	LINEAR	·	4.5 km	MPC · JPL
198507	2004 XK_{81}	—	December 10, 2004	Socorro	LINEAR	·	2.4 km	MPC · JPL
198508	2004 XY_{81}	—	December 10, 2004	Kitt Peak	Spacewatch	·	3.0 km	MPC · JPL
198509	2004 XL_{82}	—	December 11, 2004	Socorro	LINEAR	(5)	2.2 km	MPC · JPL
198510	2004 XZ_{82}	—	December 11, 2004	Kitt Peak	Spacewatch	·	2.9 km	MPC · JPL
198511	2004 XK_{84}	—	December 12, 2004	Kitt Peak	Spacewatch	·	3.3 km	MPC · JPL
198512	2004 XF_{85}	—	December 12, 2004	Kitt Peak	Spacewatch	·	2.1 km	MPC · JPL
198513	2004 XK_{87}	—	December 9, 2004	Catalina	CSS	fast	1.4 km	MPC · JPL
198514	2004 XW_{87}	—	December 9, 2004	Catalina	CSS	·	2.0 km	MPC · JPL
198515	2004 XY_{88}	—	December 10, 2004	Kitt Peak	Spacewatch	PAD	4.3 km	MPC · JPL
198516	2004 XC_{89}	—	December 10, 2004	Campo Imperatore	CINEOS	(5)	1.7 km	MPC · JPL
198517	2004 XG_{92}	—	December 11, 2004	Socorro	LINEAR	MAR	1.5 km	MPC · JPL
198518	2004 XG_{96}	—	December 11, 2004	Kitt Peak	Spacewatch	·	3.1 km	MPC · JPL
198519	2004 XY_{96}	—	December 11, 2004	Kitt Peak	Spacewatch	NEM	2.4 km	MPC · JPL
198520	2004 XZ_{96}	—	December 11, 2004	Kitt Peak	Spacewatch	·	3.5 km	MPC · JPL
198521	2004 XX_{97}	—	December 11, 2004	Kitt Peak	Spacewatch	NAE	4.3 km	MPC · JPL
198522	2004 XF_{98}	—	December 11, 2004	Kitt Peak	Spacewatch	·	4.9 km	MPC · JPL
198523	2004 XX_{100}	—	December 14, 2004	Socorro	LINEAR	(17392)	2.1 km	MPC · JPL
198524	2004 XN_{101}	—	December 14, 2004	Catalina	CSS	HOF	3.7 km	MPC · JPL
198525	2004 XJ_{103}	—	December 14, 2004	Catalina	CSS	·	3.4 km	MPC · JPL
198526	2004 XO_{103}	—	December 9, 2004	Catalina	CSS	·	2.6 km	MPC · JPL
198527	2004 XA_{104}	—	December 9, 2004	Kitt Peak	Spacewatch	·	3.3 km	MPC · JPL
198528	2004 XJ_{105}	—	December 11, 2004	Socorro	LINEAR	(5)	2.0 km	MPC · JPL
198529	2004 XY_{105}	—	December 11, 2004	Socorro	LINEAR	·	3.4 km	MPC · JPL
198530	2004 XJ_{106}	—	December 11, 2004	Socorro	LINEAR	·	1.8 km	MPC · JPL
198531	2004 XM_{106}	—	December 11, 2004	Socorro	LINEAR	·	1.8 km	MPC · JPL
198532	2004 XS_{106}	—	December 11, 2004	Socorro	LINEAR	·	2.6 km	MPC · JPL
198533	2004 XU_{106}	—	December 11, 2004	Socorro	LINEAR	(5)	2.2 km	MPC · JPL
198534	2004 XV_{107}	—	December 11, 2004	Socorro	LINEAR	·	3.9 km	MPC · JPL
198535	2004 XB_{109}	—	December 12, 2004	Socorro	LINEAR	·	3.7 km	MPC · JPL
198536	2004 XW_{110}	—	December 14, 2004	Catalina	CSS	·	2.1 km	MPC · JPL
198537	2004 XR_{111}	—	December 14, 2004	Kitt Peak	Spacewatch	·	1.8 km	MPC · JPL
198538	2004 XT_{119}	—	December 12, 2004	Kitt Peak	Spacewatch	HOF	3.9 km	MPC · JPL
198539	2004 XJ_{121}	—	December 14, 2004	Socorro	LINEAR	·	2.7 km	MPC · JPL
198540	2004 XK_{122}	—	December 9, 2004	Catalina	CSS	·	3.3 km	MPC · JPL
198541	2004 XD_{123}	—	December 10, 2004	Socorro	LINEAR	·	2.4 km	MPC · JPL
198542	2004 XB_{124}	—	December 10, 2004	Socorro	LINEAR	·	3.0 km	MPC · JPL
198543	2004 XG_{126}	—	December 12, 2004	Anderson Mesa	LONEOS	·	5.1 km	MPC · JPL
198544	2004 XO_{126}	—	December 13, 2004	Kitt Peak	Spacewatch	·	3.3 km	MPC · JPL
198545	2004 XR_{131}	—	December 11, 2004	Socorro	LINEAR	·	3.0 km	MPC · JPL
198546	2004 XS_{131}	—	December 11, 2004	Socorro	LINEAR	·	4.6 km	MPC · JPL
198547	2004 XZ_{131}	—	December 11, 2004	Socorro	LINEAR	·	2.4 km	MPC · JPL
198548	2004 XB_{132}	—	December 11, 2004	Socorro	LINEAR	·	2.9 km	MPC · JPL
198549	2004 XB_{133}	—	December 14, 2004	Socorro	LINEAR	·	3.3 km	MPC · JPL
198550	2004 XL_{133}	—	December 15, 2004	Socorro	LINEAR	·	4.6 km	MPC · JPL
198551	2004 XN_{133}	—	December 15, 2004	Socorro	LINEAR	·	2.4 km	MPC · JPL
198552	2004 XP_{134}	—	December 15, 2004	Socorro	LINEAR	·	2.2 km	MPC · JPL
198553	2004 XP_{136}	—	December 15, 2004	Socorro	LINEAR	·	3.1 km	MPC · JPL
198554	2004 XV_{136}	—	December 15, 2004	Socorro	LINEAR	·	3.0 km	MPC · JPL
198555	2004 XU_{144}	—	December 13, 2004	Campo Imperatore	CINEOS	·	2.5 km	MPC · JPL
198556	2004 XE_{145}	—	December 13, 2004	Socorro	LINEAR	·	4.0 km	MPC · JPL
198557	2004 XB_{146}	—	December 14, 2004	Socorro	LINEAR	MAR	1.9 km	MPC · JPL
198558	2004 XE_{148}	—	December 14, 2004	Socorro	LINEAR	·	3.0 km	MPC · JPL
198559	2004 XF_{148}	—	December 14, 2004	Socorro	LINEAR	(18466)	2.3 km	MPC · JPL
198560	2004 XA_{149}	—	December 14, 2004	Campo Imperatore	CINEOS	·	2.1 km	MPC · JPL
198561	2004 XX_{151}	—	December 15, 2004	Kitt Peak	Spacewatch	HOF	3.2 km	MPC · JPL
198562	2004 XQ_{153}	—	December 15, 2004	Kitt Peak	Spacewatch	KOR	1.5 km	MPC · JPL
198563	2004 XY_{155}	—	December 14, 2004	Socorro	LINEAR	·	1.8 km	MPC · JPL
198564	2004 XB_{158}	—	December 14, 2004	Kitt Peak	Spacewatch	·	2.9 km	MPC · JPL
198565	2004 XU_{161}	—	December 15, 2004	Socorro	LINEAR	·	2.1 km	MPC · JPL
198566	2004 XB_{162}	—	December 15, 2004	Catalina	CSS	·	4.7 km	MPC · JPL
198567	2004 XK_{162}	—	December 15, 2004	Socorro	LINEAR	GEF	1.8 km	MPC · JPL
198568	2004 XF_{164}	—	December 3, 2004	Anderson Mesa	LONEOS	HNS	2.0 km	MPC · JPL
198569	2004 XE_{168}	—	December 3, 2004	Kitt Peak	Spacewatch	·	2.5 km	MPC · JPL
198570	2004 XW_{171}	—	December 10, 2004	Kitt Peak	Spacewatch	·	3.0 km	MPC · JPL
198571	2004 XP_{172}	—	December 10, 2004	Socorro	LINEAR	·	2.2 km	MPC · JPL
198572	2004 XA_{177}	—	December 11, 2004	Kitt Peak	Spacewatch	·	3.3 km	MPC · JPL
198573	2004 XX_{177}	—	December 12, 2004	Kitt Peak	Spacewatch	EUN	1.8 km	MPC · JPL
198574	2004 XK_{182}	—	December 1, 2004	Catalina	CSS	JUN	1.2 km	MPC · JPL
198575	2004 YM	—	December 17, 2004	Socorro	LINEAR	BRU	6.0 km	MPC · JPL
198576	2004 YU_{3}	—	December 16, 2004	Jarnac	Jarnac	·	1.6 km	MPC · JPL
198577	2004 YG_{4}	—	December 16, 2004	Kitt Peak	Spacewatch	·	1.9 km	MPC · JPL
198578	2004 YX_{7}	—	December 18, 2004	Mount Lemmon	Mount Lemmon Survey	·	2.4 km	MPC · JPL
198579	2004 YR_{11}	—	December 18, 2004	Mount Lemmon	Mount Lemmon Survey	·	4.9 km	MPC · JPL
198580	2004 YV_{11}	—	December 18, 2004	Mount Lemmon	Mount Lemmon Survey	AGN	2.2 km	MPC · JPL
198581	2004 YR_{12}	—	December 18, 2004	Mount Lemmon	Mount Lemmon Survey	·	3.9 km	MPC · JPL
198582	2004 YT_{13}	—	December 18, 2004	Mount Lemmon	Mount Lemmon Survey	EOS · slow	3.1 km	MPC · JPL
198583	2004 YQ_{20}	—	December 18, 2004	Mount Lemmon	Mount Lemmon Survey	·	4.4 km	MPC · JPL
198584	2004 YQ_{21}	—	December 18, 2004	Mount Lemmon	Mount Lemmon Survey	·	5.3 km	MPC · JPL
198585	2004 YR_{29}	—	December 16, 2004	Anderson Mesa	LONEOS	·	2.3 km	MPC · JPL
198586	2004 YQ_{31}	—	December 19, 2004	Catalina	CSS	·	2.3 km	MPC · JPL
198587	2004 YD_{32}	—	December 17, 2004	Anderson Mesa	LONEOS	·	2.8 km	MPC · JPL
198588	2004 YP_{32}	—	December 21, 2004	Catalina	CSS	·	2.5 km	MPC · JPL
198589	2004 YQ_{33}	—	December 16, 2004	Anderson Mesa	LONEOS	·	2.6 km	MPC · JPL
198590	2004 YV_{34}	—	December 18, 2004	Mount Lemmon	Mount Lemmon Survey	·	3.0 km	MPC · JPL
198591	2004 YB_{35}	—	December 19, 2004	Anderson Mesa	LONEOS	·	2.2 km	MPC · JPL
198592 Antbernal	2005 AK	Antbernal	January 3, 2005	Begues	Manteca, J.	·	3.7 km	MPC · JPL
198593	2005 AK_{1}	—	January 1, 2005	Catalina	CSS	EOS	3.3 km	MPC · JPL
198594	2005 AR_{1}	—	January 1, 2005	Catalina	CSS	·	3.0 km	MPC · JPL
198595	2005 AD_{5}	—	January 6, 2005	Catalina	CSS	EOS ·	5.7 km	MPC · JPL
198596	2005 AR_{5}	—	January 6, 2005	Catalina	CSS	DOR	3.8 km	MPC · JPL
198597	2005 AU_{5}	—	January 6, 2005	Catalina	CSS	·	3.8 km	MPC · JPL
198598	2005 AD_{6}	—	January 6, 2005	Catalina	CSS	·	4.0 km	MPC · JPL
198599	2005 AE_{7}	—	January 6, 2005	Catalina	CSS	·	2.8 km	MPC · JPL
198600	2005 AJ_{7}	—	January 6, 2005	Catalina	CSS	(5)	2.8 km	MPC · JPL

== 198601–198700 ==
back to top

Designation			Discovery			Properties		Ref
Permanent	Provisional	Named after	Date	Site	Discoverer(s)	Category	Diam.	Ref
198601	2005 AE_{11}	—	January 1, 2005	Catalina	CSS	·	2.9 km	MPC · JPL
198602	2005 AG_{11}	—	January 1, 2005	Catalina	CSS	·	4.0 km	MPC · JPL
198603	2005 AY_{15}	—	January 6, 2005	Socorro	LINEAR	·	2.2 km	MPC · JPL
198604	2005 AT_{18}	—	January 8, 2005	Socorro	LINEAR	·	3.5 km	MPC · JPL
198605	2005 AM_{19}	—	January 11, 2005	Socorro	LINEAR	KOR · slow	2.2 km	MPC · JPL
198606	2005 AF_{22}	—	January 7, 2005	Socorro	LINEAR	·	1.7 km	MPC · JPL
198607	2005 AL_{22}	—	January 7, 2005	Socorro	LINEAR	·	6.6 km	MPC · JPL
198608	2005 AH_{23}	—	January 7, 2005	Socorro	LINEAR	·	2.3 km	MPC · JPL
198609	2005 AJ_{23}	—	January 7, 2005	Socorro	LINEAR	·	3.0 km	MPC · JPL
198610	2005 AN_{23}	—	January 7, 2005	Socorro	LINEAR	·	3.9 km	MPC · JPL
198611	2005 AJ_{24}	—	January 7, 2005	Catalina	CSS	·	3.8 km	MPC · JPL
198612	2005 AK_{24}	—	January 7, 2005	Catalina	CSS	(5)	2.1 km	MPC · JPL
198613	2005 AU_{24}	—	January 7, 2005	Catalina	CSS	·	4.0 km	MPC · JPL
198614	2005 AO_{26}	—	January 13, 2005	Uccle	T. Pauwels	·	3.4 km	MPC · JPL
198615	2005 AY_{26}	—	January 13, 2005	Kitt Peak	Spacewatch	·	5.6 km	MPC · JPL
198616 Lucabracali	2005 AF_{29}	Lucabracali	January 14, 2005	San Marcello	L. Tesi, Fagioli, G.	·	3.7 km	MPC · JPL
198617	2005 AU_{31}	—	January 11, 2005	Socorro	LINEAR	·	2.1 km	MPC · JPL
198618	2005 AA_{33}	—	January 12, 2005	Socorro	LINEAR	·	2.9 km	MPC · JPL
198619	2005 AD_{33}	—	January 12, 2005	Socorro	LINEAR	·	2.0 km	MPC · JPL
198620	2005 AJ_{36}	—	January 13, 2005	Socorro	LINEAR	PAD	3.2 km	MPC · JPL
198621	2005 AJ_{41}	—	January 15, 2005	Socorro	LINEAR	NYS	2.1 km	MPC · JPL
198622	2005 AU_{41}	—	January 15, 2005	Socorro	LINEAR	·	2.5 km	MPC · JPL
198623	2005 AB_{42}	—	January 15, 2005	Catalina	CSS	·	2.3 km	MPC · JPL
198624	2005 AE_{42}	—	January 15, 2005	Catalina	CSS	EUN	2.4 km	MPC · JPL
198625	2005 AA_{46}	—	January 15, 2005	Catalina	CSS	·	3.2 km	MPC · JPL
198626	2005 AQ_{46}	—	January 11, 2005	Socorro	LINEAR	·	3.1 km	MPC · JPL
198627	2005 AE_{47}	—	January 12, 2005	Socorro	LINEAR	·	4.1 km	MPC · JPL
198628	2005 AH_{47}	—	January 13, 2005	Kitt Peak	Spacewatch	·	3.0 km	MPC · JPL
198629	2005 AM_{50}	—	January 13, 2005	Socorro	LINEAR	MRX	1.5 km	MPC · JPL
198630	2005 AR_{51}	—	January 13, 2005	Kitt Peak	Spacewatch	·	2.9 km	MPC · JPL
198631	2005 AW_{51}	—	January 13, 2005	Kitt Peak	Spacewatch	·	3.8 km	MPC · JPL
198632	2005 AQ_{52}	—	January 13, 2005	Kitt Peak	Spacewatch	·	3.1 km	MPC · JPL
198633	2005 AG_{54}	—	January 13, 2005	Kitt Peak	Spacewatch	·	3.6 km	MPC · JPL
198634 Burgaymarta	2005 AN_{54}	Burgaymarta	January 15, 2005	Vallemare di Borbona	Borbona, Vallemare	EOS	2.6 km	MPC · JPL
198635	2005 AT_{54}	—	January 15, 2005	Catalina	CSS	·	3.1 km	MPC · JPL
198636	2005 AM_{57}	—	January 15, 2005	Anderson Mesa	LONEOS	·	5.9 km	MPC · JPL
198637	2005 AN_{57}	—	January 15, 2005	Catalina	CSS	·	3.1 km	MPC · JPL
198638	2005 AL_{60}	—	January 15, 2005	Kitt Peak	Spacewatch	·	3.8 km	MPC · JPL
198639	2005 AU_{60}	—	January 15, 2005	Kitt Peak	Spacewatch	EOS	3.0 km	MPC · JPL
198640	2005 AC_{62}	—	January 15, 2005	Kitt Peak	Spacewatch	·	4.2 km	MPC · JPL
198641	2005 AD_{65}	—	January 13, 2005	Kitt Peak	Spacewatch	KOR	1.6 km	MPC · JPL
198642	2005 AY_{65}	—	January 13, 2005	Kitt Peak	Spacewatch	·	4.3 km	MPC · JPL
198643	2005 AO_{71}	—	January 15, 2005	Socorro	LINEAR	KOR	2.1 km	MPC · JPL
198644	2005 AA_{76}	—	January 15, 2005	Anderson Mesa	LONEOS	·	3.7 km	MPC · JPL
198645	2005 AJ_{76}	—	January 15, 2005	Kitt Peak	Spacewatch	HYG	3.8 km	MPC · JPL
198646	2005 AV_{78}	—	January 15, 2005	Kitt Peak	Spacewatch	·	4.8 km	MPC · JPL
198647	2005 AS_{79}	—	January 15, 2005	Kitt Peak	Spacewatch	NAE	4.9 km	MPC · JPL
198648	2005 AK_{80}	—	January 15, 2005	Kitt Peak	Spacewatch	KOR	1.9 km	MPC · JPL
198649	2005 BY_{3}	—	January 16, 2005	Kitt Peak	Spacewatch	·	3.2 km	MPC · JPL
198650	2005 BR_{4}	—	January 16, 2005	Socorro	LINEAR	·	2.4 km	MPC · JPL
198651	2005 BR_{8}	—	January 16, 2005	Socorro	LINEAR	·	4.7 km	MPC · JPL
198652	2005 BS_{9}	—	January 16, 2005	Socorro	LINEAR	·	5.3 km	MPC · JPL
198653	2005 BY_{9}	—	January 16, 2005	Socorro	LINEAR	·	2.7 km	MPC · JPL
198654	2005 BL_{10}	—	January 16, 2005	Socorro	LINEAR	EOS	3.6 km	MPC · JPL
198655	2005 BV_{10}	—	January 16, 2005	Socorro	LINEAR	·	3.6 km	MPC · JPL
198656	2005 BH_{13}	—	January 17, 2005	Socorro	LINEAR	KOR	2.1 km	MPC · JPL
198657	2005 BF_{16}	—	January 16, 2005	Socorro	LINEAR	HOF	4.3 km	MPC · JPL
198658	2005 BT_{16}	—	January 16, 2005	Socorro	LINEAR	·	3.5 km	MPC · JPL
198659	2005 BH_{18}	—	January 16, 2005	Socorro	LINEAR	·	3.9 km	MPC · JPL
198660	2005 BW_{18}	—	January 16, 2005	Kitt Peak	Spacewatch	·	3.5 km	MPC · JPL
198661	2005 BZ_{18}	—	January 16, 2005	Socorro	LINEAR	·	3.3 km	MPC · JPL
198662	2005 BB_{20}	—	January 16, 2005	Socorro	LINEAR	·	6.0 km	MPC · JPL
198663	2005 BA_{22}	—	January 16, 2005	Kitt Peak	Spacewatch	·	3.3 km	MPC · JPL
198664	2005 BE_{23}	—	January 16, 2005	Kitt Peak	Spacewatch	KOR	1.8 km	MPC · JPL
198665	2005 BK_{23}	—	January 16, 2005	Kitt Peak	Spacewatch	·	3.8 km	MPC · JPL
198666	2005 BN_{23}	—	January 16, 2005	Kitt Peak	Spacewatch	·	5.0 km	MPC · JPL
198667	2005 BQ_{24}	—	January 17, 2005	Catalina	CSS	·	3.9 km	MPC · JPL
198668	2005 BV_{25}	—	January 18, 2005	Catalina	CSS	·	3.1 km	MPC · JPL
198669	2005 BA_{26}	—	January 18, 2005	Catalina	CSS	·	5.0 km	MPC · JPL
198670	2005 BJ_{28}	—	January 31, 2005	RAS	Lowe, A.	·	2.2 km	MPC · JPL
198671	2005 BK_{28}	—	January 31, 2005	RAS	Lowe, A.	·	3.5 km	MPC · JPL
198672	2005 BJ_{42}	—	January 16, 2005	Mauna Kea	Veillet, C.	THM	3.4 km	MPC · JPL
198673 Herrero	2005 BG_{44}	Herrero	January 19, 2005	Catalina	CSS	·	6.6 km	MPC · JPL
198674	2005 CU_{1}	—	February 1, 2005	Catalina	CSS	·	5.0 km	MPC · JPL
198675	2005 CY_{2}	—	February 1, 2005	Catalina	CSS	AEO	1.7 km	MPC · JPL
198676	2005 CW_{4}	—	February 1, 2005	Catalina	CSS	·	3.2 km	MPC · JPL
198677	2005 CE_{5}	—	February 1, 2005	Kitt Peak	Spacewatch	LIX	7.6 km	MPC · JPL
198678	2005 CN_{5}	—	February 1, 2005	Kitt Peak	Spacewatch	·	3.1 km	MPC · JPL
198679	2005 CM_{6}	—	February 1, 2005	Kitt Peak	Spacewatch	VER	4.7 km	MPC · JPL
198680	2005 CN_{6}	—	February 1, 2005	Kitt Peak	Spacewatch	·	4.0 km	MPC · JPL
198681	2005 CC_{8}	—	February 1, 2005	Catalina	CSS	·	2.9 km	MPC · JPL
198682	2005 CL_{8}	—	February 1, 2005	Catalina	CSS	·	1.6 km	MPC · JPL
198683	2005 CC_{10}	—	February 1, 2005	Kitt Peak	Spacewatch	·	3.4 km	MPC · JPL
198684	2005 CY_{11}	—	February 1, 2005	Catalina	CSS	·	3.9 km	MPC · JPL
198685	2005 CH_{12}	—	February 1, 2005	Palomar	NEAT	(13314)	3.7 km	MPC · JPL
198686	2005 CY_{12}	—	February 2, 2005	Kitt Peak	Spacewatch	HOF	3.3 km	MPC · JPL
198687	2005 CH_{15}	—	February 2, 2005	Socorro	LINEAR	·	1.5 km	MPC · JPL
198688	2005 CJ_{18}	—	February 2, 2005	Catalina	CSS	·	2.3 km	MPC · JPL
198689	2005 CO_{19}	—	February 2, 2005	Catalina	CSS	·	2.8 km	MPC · JPL
198690	2005 CX_{19}	—	February 2, 2005	Kitt Peak	Spacewatch	·	4.7 km	MPC · JPL
198691	2005 CH_{20}	—	February 2, 2005	Catalina	CSS	·	3.7 km	MPC · JPL
198692	2005 CT_{20}	—	February 2, 2005	Catalina	CSS	·	4.6 km	MPC · JPL
198693	2005 CA_{22}	—	February 3, 2005	Socorro	LINEAR	·	3.1 km	MPC · JPL
198694	2005 CR_{22}	—	February 1, 2005	Catalina	CSS	·	7.2 km	MPC · JPL
198695	2005 CX_{22}	—	February 1, 2005	Catalina	CSS	615	2.5 km	MPC · JPL
198696	2005 CT_{23}	—	February 2, 2005	Socorro	LINEAR	·	5.5 km	MPC · JPL
198697	2005 CT_{24}	—	February 4, 2005	Catalina	CSS	·	2.8 km	MPC · JPL
198698	2005 CU_{24}	—	February 4, 2005	Palomar	NEAT	BRA	2.0 km	MPC · JPL
198699	2005 CC_{25}	—	February 4, 2005	Palomar	NEAT	·	3.3 km	MPC · JPL
198700 Nataliegrünewald	2005 CM_{25}	Nataliegrünewald	February 5, 2005	Wildberg	R. Apitzsch	·	3.1 km	MPC · JPL

== 198701–198800 ==
back to top

Designation			Discovery			Properties		Ref
Permanent	Provisional	Named after	Date	Site	Discoverer(s)	Category	Diam.	Ref
198701	2005 CC_{26}	—	February 1, 2005	Catalina	CSS	·	3.7 km	MPC · JPL
198702	2005 CE_{26}	—	February 1, 2005	Catalina	CSS	·	1.8 km	MPC · JPL
198703	2005 CF_{26}	—	February 1, 2005	Catalina	CSS	THM	3.5 km	MPC · JPL
198704	2005 CB_{38}	—	February 3, 2005	Socorro	LINEAR	·	3.6 km	MPC · JPL
198705	2005 CK_{43}	—	February 2, 2005	Catalina	CSS	AEO	1.9 km	MPC · JPL
198706	2005 CA_{47}	—	February 2, 2005	Kitt Peak	Spacewatch	·	3.7 km	MPC · JPL
198707	2005 CF_{48}	—	February 2, 2005	Socorro	LINEAR	HYG	4.4 km	MPC · JPL
198708	2005 CY_{48}	—	February 2, 2005	Socorro	LINEAR	·	4.2 km	MPC · JPL
198709	2005 CC_{49}	—	February 2, 2005	Socorro	LINEAR	·	2.4 km	MPC · JPL
198710	2005 CN_{49}	—	February 2, 2005	Catalina	CSS	·	4.8 km	MPC · JPL
198711	2005 CM_{50}	—	February 2, 2005	Socorro	LINEAR	·	4.2 km	MPC · JPL
198712	2005 CS_{51}	—	February 2, 2005	Catalina	CSS	·	6.6 km	MPC · JPL
198713	2005 CA_{54}	—	February 4, 2005	Kitt Peak	Spacewatch	·	5.6 km	MPC · JPL
198714	2005 CT_{56}	—	February 2, 2005	Kitt Peak	Spacewatch	·	3.2 km	MPC · JPL
198715	2005 CD_{58}	—	February 2, 2005	Catalina	CSS	·	3.7 km	MPC · JPL
198716	2005 CR_{58}	—	February 2, 2005	Kitt Peak	Spacewatch	·	4.8 km	MPC · JPL
198717 Szymczyk	2005 CM_{61}	Szymczyk	February 13, 2005	RAS	Lowe, A.	·	4.7 km	MPC · JPL
198718	2005 CC_{64}	—	February 9, 2005	Anderson Mesa	LONEOS	·	5.1 km	MPC · JPL
198719	2005 CP_{64}	—	February 9, 2005	Anderson Mesa	LONEOS	EOS	2.9 km	MPC · JPL
198720	2005 CN_{72}	—	February 1, 2005	Kitt Peak	Spacewatch	·	3.1 km	MPC · JPL
198721	2005 CR_{74}	—	February 2, 2005	Kitt Peak	Spacewatch	HYG	4.7 km	MPC · JPL
198722	2005 CU_{78}	—	February 9, 2005	Mount Lemmon	Mount Lemmon Survey	3:2 · SHU	9.5 km	MPC · JPL
198723	2005 EV_{4}	—	March 1, 2005	Kitt Peak	Spacewatch	·	5.6 km	MPC · JPL
198724	2005 EH_{5}	—	March 1, 2005	Kitt Peak	Spacewatch	·	3.5 km	MPC · JPL
198725	2005 EY_{12}	—	March 2, 2005	Catalina	CSS	·	5.4 km	MPC · JPL
198726	2005 EP_{18}	—	March 3, 2005	Kitt Peak	Spacewatch	·	4.3 km	MPC · JPL
198727	2005 EF_{21}	—	March 3, 2005	Catalina	CSS	·	3.4 km	MPC · JPL
198728	2005 EG_{21}	—	March 3, 2005	Catalina	CSS	·	6.0 km	MPC · JPL
198729	2005 EE_{23}	—	March 3, 2005	Catalina	CSS	·	3.9 km	MPC · JPL
198730	2005 EF_{23}	—	March 3, 2005	Catalina	CSS	·	3.5 km	MPC · JPL
198731	2005 EM_{23}	—	March 3, 2005	Catalina	CSS	HYG	4.9 km	MPC · JPL
198732	2005 EQ_{23}	—	March 3, 2005	Catalina	CSS	·	4.7 km	MPC · JPL
198733	2005 EV_{23}	—	March 3, 2005	Catalina	CSS	THM	3.8 km	MPC · JPL
198734	2005 EM_{24}	—	March 3, 2005	Catalina	CSS	·	5.0 km	MPC · JPL
198735	2005 EC_{25}	—	March 3, 2005	Catalina	CSS	·	3.6 km	MPC · JPL
198736	2005 EB_{28}	—	March 3, 2005	Socorro	LINEAR	THM	4.6 km	MPC · JPL
198737	2005 EW_{28}	—	March 3, 2005	Catalina	CSS	·	2.4 km	MPC · JPL
198738	2005 EO_{29}	—	March 3, 2005	Catalina	CSS	·	3.5 km	MPC · JPL
198739	2005 EN_{32}	—	March 3, 2005	Catalina	CSS	·	5.6 km	MPC · JPL
198740	2005 EK_{34}	—	March 3, 2005	Catalina	CSS	·	4.3 km	MPC · JPL
198741	2005 EY_{34}	—	March 3, 2005	Kitt Peak	Spacewatch	·	5.6 km	MPC · JPL
198742	2005 EN_{35}	—	March 4, 2005	Catalina	CSS	·	3.5 km	MPC · JPL
198743	2005 EX_{36}	—	March 4, 2005	Socorro	LINEAR	·	5.5 km	MPC · JPL
198744	2005 EM_{42}	—	March 2, 2005	Kitt Peak	Spacewatch	·	2.7 km	MPC · JPL
198745	2005 EC_{48}	—	March 3, 2005	Catalina	CSS	VER	6.0 km	MPC · JPL
198746	2005 EC_{51}	—	March 3, 2005	Catalina	CSS	THM	5.4 km	MPC · JPL
198747	2005 EN_{51}	—	March 3, 2005	Catalina	CSS	·	1.7 km	MPC · JPL
198748	2005 EV_{55}	—	March 4, 2005	Kitt Peak	Spacewatch	·	3.5 km	MPC · JPL
198749	2005 EM_{58}	—	March 4, 2005	Kitt Peak	Spacewatch	·	5.6 km	MPC · JPL
198750	2005 ER_{58}	—	March 4, 2005	Kitt Peak	Spacewatch	·	5.1 km	MPC · JPL
198751	2005 EP_{59}	—	March 4, 2005	Kitt Peak	Spacewatch	HYG	3.6 km	MPC · JPL
198752	2005 EA_{60}	—	March 4, 2005	Mount Lemmon	Mount Lemmon Survey	AMO	370 m	MPC · JPL
198753	2005 EL_{73}	—	March 3, 2005	Kitt Peak	Spacewatch	·	3.0 km	MPC · JPL
198754	2005 EJ_{74}	—	March 3, 2005	Catalina	CSS	·	3.5 km	MPC · JPL
198755	2005 EY_{76}	—	March 3, 2005	Kitt Peak	Spacewatch	·	6.1 km	MPC · JPL
198756	2005 EJ_{82}	—	March 4, 2005	Mount Lemmon	Mount Lemmon Survey	·	3.5 km	MPC · JPL
198757	2005 EU_{85}	—	March 4, 2005	Socorro	LINEAR	THM	3.3 km	MPC · JPL
198758	2005 EG_{86}	—	March 4, 2005	Socorro	LINEAR	·	2.6 km	MPC · JPL
198759	2005 EX_{86}	—	March 4, 2005	Mount Lemmon	Mount Lemmon Survey	·	3.1 km	MPC · JPL
198760	2005 EC_{90}	—	March 8, 2005	Socorro	LINEAR	EOS	3.2 km	MPC · JPL
198761	2005 EU_{90}	—	March 8, 2005	Socorro	LINEAR	·	4.1 km	MPC · JPL
198762	2005 EA_{91}	—	March 8, 2005	Socorro	LINEAR	·	4.3 km	MPC · JPL
198763	2005 EG_{92}	—	March 8, 2005	Anderson Mesa	LONEOS	·	6.2 km	MPC · JPL
198764	2005 EY_{92}	—	March 8, 2005	Socorro	LINEAR	·	6.2 km	MPC · JPL
198765	2005 EX_{94}	—	March 10, 2005	RAS	Lowe, A.	·	5.4 km	MPC · JPL
198766	2005 EC_{96}	—	March 3, 2005	Catalina	CSS	VER	4.5 km	MPC · JPL
198767	2005 EF_{96}	—	March 3, 2005	Catalina	CSS	DOR	4.2 km	MPC · JPL
198768	2005 EO_{96}	—	March 3, 2005	Catalina	CSS	·	4.6 km	MPC · JPL
198769	2005 EW_{96}	—	March 3, 2005	Catalina	CSS	·	3.0 km	MPC · JPL
198770	2005 EG_{97}	—	March 3, 2005	Catalina	CSS	·	5.3 km	MPC · JPL
198771	2005 EY_{97}	—	March 3, 2005	Catalina	CSS	·	3.4 km	MPC · JPL
198772	2005 EG_{99}	—	March 3, 2005	Catalina	CSS	·	3.0 km	MPC · JPL
198773	2005 EN_{99}	—	March 3, 2005	Catalina	CSS	·	2.0 km	MPC · JPL
198774	2005 EC_{100}	—	March 3, 2005	Catalina	CSS	·	3.2 km	MPC · JPL
198775	2005 ED_{100}	—	March 3, 2005	Catalina	CSS	VER	4.9 km	MPC · JPL
198776	2005 ET_{101}	—	March 3, 2005	Kitt Peak	Spacewatch	·	4.3 km	MPC · JPL
198777	2005 EY_{101}	—	March 3, 2005	Catalina	CSS	·	2.4 km	MPC · JPL
198778	2005 EG_{109}	—	March 4, 2005	Catalina	CSS	EOS	3.0 km	MPC · JPL
198779	2005 EA_{111}	—	March 4, 2005	Catalina	CSS	·	5.8 km	MPC · JPL
198780	2005 EP_{113}	—	March 4, 2005	Socorro	LINEAR	EOS	3.3 km	MPC · JPL
198781	2005 EK_{114}	—	March 4, 2005	Mount Lemmon	Mount Lemmon Survey	THM	2.6 km	MPC · JPL
198782	2005 EM_{115}	—	March 4, 2005	Socorro	LINEAR	·	3.8 km	MPC · JPL
198783	2005 ES_{118}	—	March 7, 2005	Socorro	LINEAR	EOS	3.6 km	MPC · JPL
198784	2005 EU_{121}	—	March 8, 2005	Socorro	LINEAR	·	6.0 km	MPC · JPL
198785	2005 EH_{124}	—	March 8, 2005	Anderson Mesa	LONEOS	THM	4.0 km	MPC · JPL
198786	2005 EP_{129}	—	March 9, 2005	Mount Lemmon	Mount Lemmon Survey	·	5.1 km	MPC · JPL
198787	2005 EV_{129}	—	March 9, 2005	Mount Lemmon	Mount Lemmon Survey	·	2.6 km	MPC · JPL
198788	2005 EQ_{131}	—	March 9, 2005	Mount Lemmon	Mount Lemmon Survey	·	6.0 km	MPC · JPL
198789	2005 EV_{132}	—	March 9, 2005	Kitt Peak	Spacewatch	·	2.7 km	MPC · JPL
198790	2005 EH_{133}	—	March 9, 2005	Catalina	CSS	·	3.1 km	MPC · JPL
198791	2005 EC_{134}	—	March 9, 2005	Kitt Peak	Spacewatch	VER	5.7 km	MPC · JPL
198792	2005 EW_{136}	—	March 9, 2005	Mount Lemmon	Mount Lemmon Survey	·	5.8 km	MPC · JPL
198793	2005 EN_{137}	—	March 9, 2005	Mount Lemmon	Mount Lemmon Survey	THM	3.1 km	MPC · JPL
198794	2005 EX_{137}	—	March 9, 2005	Mount Lemmon	Mount Lemmon Survey	THM	3.4 km	MPC · JPL
198795	2005 EY_{140}	—	March 10, 2005	Mount Lemmon	Mount Lemmon Survey	·	3.4 km	MPC · JPL
198796	2005 ET_{152}	—	March 10, 2005	Kitt Peak	Spacewatch	HYG	3.6 km	MPC · JPL
198797	2005 EF_{156}	—	March 9, 2005	Catalina	CSS	·	2.5 km	MPC · JPL
198798	2005 EM_{156}	—	March 9, 2005	Catalina	CSS	EOS	3.6 km	MPC · JPL
198799	2005 EL_{157}	—	March 9, 2005	Mount Lemmon	Mount Lemmon Survey	·	2.9 km	MPC · JPL
198800	2005 EZ_{166}	—	March 11, 2005	Mount Lemmon	Mount Lemmon Survey	·	3.6 km	MPC · JPL

== 198801–198900 ==
back to top

Designation			Discovery			Properties		Ref
Permanent	Provisional	Named after	Date	Site	Discoverer(s)	Category	Diam.	Ref
198801	2005 EH_{172}	—	March 7, 2005	Siding Spring	SSS	HYG	5.0 km	MPC · JPL
198802	2005 ET_{175}	—	March 8, 2005	Socorro	LINEAR	·	4.0 km	MPC · JPL
198803	2005 EW_{177}	—	March 9, 2005	Kitt Peak	Spacewatch	·	4.7 km	MPC · JPL
198804	2005 EW_{180}	—	March 9, 2005	Mount Lemmon	Mount Lemmon Survey	KOR	1.7 km	MPC · JPL
198805	2005 EE_{190}	—	March 11, 2005	Mount Lemmon	Mount Lemmon Survey	·	2.8 km	MPC · JPL
198806	2005 ES_{194}	—	March 11, 2005	Mount Lemmon	Mount Lemmon Survey	·	4.4 km	MPC · JPL
198807	2005 EX_{195}	—	March 11, 2005	Mount Lemmon	Mount Lemmon Survey	·	3.8 km	MPC · JPL
198808	2005 EY_{196}	—	March 11, 2005	Anderson Mesa	LONEOS	·	5.3 km	MPC · JPL
198809	2005 EG_{201}	—	March 8, 2005	Catalina	CSS	·	3.7 km	MPC · JPL
198810	2005 EK_{201}	—	March 8, 2005	Catalina	CSS	BRA	2.5 km	MPC · JPL
198811	2005 EF_{203}	—	March 10, 2005	Mount Lemmon	Mount Lemmon Survey	THM	3.6 km	MPC · JPL
198812	2005 EV_{207}	—	March 4, 2005	Kitt Peak	Spacewatch	·	2.3 km	MPC · JPL
198813	2005 EB_{217}	—	March 9, 2005	Catalina	CSS	·	3.2 km	MPC · JPL
198814	2005 EJ_{218}	—	March 10, 2005	Anderson Mesa	LONEOS	EOS	3.6 km	MPC · JPL
198815	2005 EJ_{222}	—	March 12, 2005	Great Shefford	Birtwhistle, P.	CYB	7.5 km	MPC · JPL
198816	2005 EZ_{222}	—	March 10, 2005	Catalina	CSS	HYG	4.8 km	MPC · JPL
198817	2005 EZ_{244}	—	March 11, 2005	Socorro	LINEAR	·	4.1 km	MPC · JPL
198818	2005 EK_{247}	—	March 12, 2005	Socorro	LINEAR	VER	4.4 km	MPC · JPL
198819	2005 ES_{247}	—	March 12, 2005	Socorro	LINEAR	EOS	2.7 km	MPC · JPL
198820 Iwanowska	2005 ET_{249}	Iwanowska	March 13, 2005	Moletai	K. Černis, Zdanavicius, J.	·	5.4 km	MPC · JPL
198821	2005 ER_{258}	—	March 11, 2005	Mount Lemmon	Mount Lemmon Survey	·	5.0 km	MPC · JPL
198822	2005 EW_{263}	—	March 13, 2005	Mount Lemmon	Mount Lemmon Survey	·	4.9 km	MPC · JPL
198823	2005 ES_{264}	—	March 13, 2005	Kitt Peak	Spacewatch	HYG	3.4 km	MPC · JPL
198824	2005 EV_{265}	—	March 13, 2005	Catalina	CSS	HYG	5.4 km	MPC · JPL
198825	2005 EW_{272}	—	March 3, 2005	Kitt Peak	Spacewatch	·	3.6 km	MPC · JPL
198826	2005 EY_{272}	—	March 3, 2005	Kitt Peak	Spacewatch	·	4.8 km	MPC · JPL
198827	2005 EA_{273}	—	March 3, 2005	Catalina	CSS	EOS	3.1 km	MPC · JPL
198828	2005 EA_{277}	—	March 8, 2005	Mount Lemmon	Mount Lemmon Survey	·	3.8 km	MPC · JPL
198829	2005 EP_{279}	—	March 10, 2005	Catalina	CSS	·	5.9 km	MPC · JPL
198830	2005 EX_{285}	—	March 1, 2005	Catalina	CSS	·	6.1 km	MPC · JPL
198831	2005 EL_{290}	—	March 9, 2005	Siding Spring	SSS	·	2.2 km	MPC · JPL
198832	2005 EY_{295}	—	March 9, 2005	Kitt Peak	M. W. Buie	·	2.7 km	MPC · JPL
198833	2005 EB_{315}	—	March 11, 2005	Kitt Peak	M. W. Buie	·	4.2 km	MPC · JPL
198834	2005 EW_{326}	—	March 8, 2005	Mount Lemmon	Mount Lemmon Survey	·	4.6 km	MPC · JPL
198835	2005 GY_{2}	—	April 1, 2005	Anderson Mesa	LONEOS	LIX	5.6 km	MPC · JPL
198836	2005 GP_{39}	—	April 4, 2005	Catalina	CSS	·	5.9 km	MPC · JPL
198837	2005 GT_{47}	—	April 5, 2005	Palomar	NEAT	·	8.9 km	MPC · JPL
198838	2005 GB_{54}	—	April 4, 2005	Socorro	LINEAR	·	6.8 km	MPC · JPL
198839	2005 GV_{54}	—	April 5, 2005	Mount Lemmon	Mount Lemmon Survey	NYS	1.4 km	MPC · JPL
198840	2005 GZ_{57}	—	April 6, 2005	Mount Lemmon	Mount Lemmon Survey	·	3.1 km	MPC · JPL
198841	2005 GL_{74}	—	April 5, 2005	Anderson Mesa	LONEOS	·	2.7 km	MPC · JPL
198842	2005 GT_{85}	—	April 4, 2005	Mount Lemmon	Mount Lemmon Survey	·	3.1 km	MPC · JPL
198843	2005 GW_{108}	—	April 10, 2005	Mount Lemmon	Mount Lemmon Survey	·	3.5 km	MPC · JPL
198844	2005 GP_{119}	—	April 9, 2005	Siding Spring	SSS	EUN	2.6 km	MPC · JPL
198845	2005 GF_{120}	—	April 2, 2005	Anderson Mesa	LONEOS	·	5.6 km	MPC · JPL
198846	2005 GV_{178}	—	April 15, 2005	Siding Spring	SSS	·	8.4 km	MPC · JPL
198847	2005 GO_{189}	—	April 12, 2005	Kitt Peak	M. W. Buie	THM	3.0 km	MPC · JPL
198848	2005 GK_{196}	—	April 10, 2005	Kitt Peak	M. W. Buie	·	4.0 km	MPC · JPL
198849	2005 HJ_{7}	—	April 30, 2005	Kitt Peak	Spacewatch	·	2.8 km	MPC · JPL
198850	2005 JC_{88}	—	May 10, 2005	Kitt Peak	Spacewatch	·	5.5 km	MPC · JPL
198851	2005 JY_{98}	—	May 8, 2005	Siding Spring	SSS	·	3.2 km	MPC · JPL
198852	2005 JS_{103}	—	May 10, 2005	Kitt Peak	Spacewatch	·	5.3 km	MPC · JPL
198853	2005 JY_{152}	—	May 4, 2005	Mount Lemmon	Mount Lemmon Survey	·	2.8 km	MPC · JPL
198854	2005 JZ_{178}	—	May 14, 2005	Palomar	NEAT	·	5.6 km	MPC · JPL
198855	2005 LH_{3}	—	June 2, 2005	Socorro	LINEAR	H	720 m	MPC · JPL
198856	2005 LR_{3}	—	June 4, 2005	Socorro	LINEAR	AMO +1km	740 m	MPC · JPL
198857	2005 LJ_{7}	—	June 1, 2005	Kitt Peak	Spacewatch	·	5.2 km	MPC · JPL
198858	2005 LN_{51}	—	June 14, 2005	Kitt Peak	Spacewatch	L4	10 km	MPC · JPL
198859	2005 MP_{32}	—	June 28, 2005	Palomar	NEAT	H	870 m	MPC · JPL
198860	2005 NX_{41}	—	July 4, 2005	Palomar	NEAT	H	1.0 km	MPC · JPL
198861	2005 OX_{2}	—	July 30, 2005	Socorro	LINEAR	H	940 m	MPC · JPL
198862	2005 QK_{8}	—	August 25, 2005	Palomar	NEAT	H	780 m	MPC · JPL
198863	2005 QL_{23}	—	August 27, 2005	Anderson Mesa	LONEOS	·	880 m	MPC · JPL
198864	2005 QS_{84}	—	August 30, 2005	Kitt Peak	Spacewatch	·	1.7 km	MPC · JPL
198865	2005 QT_{157}	—	August 30, 2005	RAS	Hutsebaut, R.	·	980 m	MPC · JPL
198866	2005 QU_{167}	—	August 28, 2005	Anderson Mesa	LONEOS	H	850 m	MPC · JPL
198867	2005 QO_{181}	—	August 30, 2005	Palomar	NEAT	·	1.1 km	MPC · JPL
198868	2005 RB_{1}	—	September 2, 2005	Palomar	NEAT	H	1.3 km	MPC · JPL
198869	2005 RO_{24}	—	September 11, 2005	Anderson Mesa	LONEOS	·	1.2 km	MPC · JPL
198870	2005 RS_{27}	—	September 10, 2005	Anderson Mesa	LONEOS	·	1.3 km	MPC · JPL
198871	2005 RY_{32}	—	September 8, 2005	Socorro	LINEAR	·	1.2 km	MPC · JPL
198872	2005 SU_{2}	—	September 23, 2005	Catalina	CSS	·	810 m	MPC · JPL
198873	2005 SZ_{28}	—	September 23, 2005	Kitt Peak	Spacewatch	·	1.3 km	MPC · JPL
198874	2005 SK_{30}	—	September 23, 2005	Catalina	CSS	·	880 m	MPC · JPL
198875	2005 SA_{44}	—	September 24, 2005	Kitt Peak	Spacewatch	·	1.0 km	MPC · JPL
198876	2005 SD_{48}	—	September 24, 2005	Kitt Peak	Spacewatch	·	1.1 km	MPC · JPL
198877	2005 SH_{71}	—	September 30, 2005	Siding Spring	SSS	H	960 m	MPC · JPL
198878	2005 SJ_{93}	—	September 24, 2005	Kitt Peak	Spacewatch	·	730 m	MPC · JPL
198879	2005 SC_{123}	—	September 29, 2005	Anderson Mesa	LONEOS	·	1.1 km	MPC · JPL
198880	2005 SN_{140}	—	September 25, 2005	Kitt Peak	Spacewatch	·	740 m	MPC · JPL
198881	2005 SX_{180}	—	September 29, 2005	Anderson Mesa	LONEOS	·	960 m	MPC · JPL
198882	2005 SH_{187}	—	September 29, 2005	Anderson Mesa	LONEOS	·	1.1 km	MPC · JPL
198883	2005 ST_{215}	—	September 30, 2005	Catalina	CSS	·	2.3 km	MPC · JPL
198884	2005 SH_{253}	—	September 30, 2005	Kitt Peak	Spacewatch	·	1.5 km	MPC · JPL
198885	2005 SE_{281}	—	September 30, 2005	Mount Lemmon	Mount Lemmon Survey	V	980 m	MPC · JPL
198886	2005 TT_{10}	—	October 2, 2005	Catalina	CSS	·	1.2 km	MPC · JPL
198887	2005 TE_{63}	—	October 4, 2005	Mount Lemmon	Mount Lemmon Survey	·	870 m	MPC · JPL
198888	2005 TY_{77}	—	October 6, 2005	Anderson Mesa	LONEOS	·	1.1 km	MPC · JPL
198889	2005 TW_{81}	—	October 3, 2005	Kitt Peak	Spacewatch	·	1.1 km	MPC · JPL
198890	2005 TH_{83}	—	October 3, 2005	Socorro	LINEAR	·	1.3 km	MPC · JPL
198891	2005 TF_{90}	—	October 5, 2005	Kitt Peak	Spacewatch	PHO	1.8 km	MPC · JPL
198892	2005 TO_{104}	—	October 8, 2005	Socorro	LINEAR	·	1.0 km	MPC · JPL
198893	2005 TW_{138}	—	October 8, 2005	Kitt Peak	Spacewatch	·	670 m	MPC · JPL
198894	2005 TL_{152}	—	October 11, 2005	Kitt Peak	Spacewatch	·	1.5 km	MPC · JPL
198895	2005 TQ_{168}	—	October 9, 2005	Kitt Peak	Spacewatch	·	2.1 km	MPC · JPL
198896	2005 TC_{173}	—	October 13, 2005	Socorro	LINEAR	·	1 km	MPC · JPL
198897	2005 UZ_{7}	—	October 26, 2005	Ottmarsheim	C. Rinner	·	1.4 km	MPC · JPL
198898	2005 US_{16}	—	October 22, 2005	Kitt Peak	Spacewatch	·	740 m	MPC · JPL
198899	2005 UQ_{27}	—	October 23, 2005	Catalina	CSS	·	900 m	MPC · JPL
198900	2005 UH_{30}	—	October 23, 2005	Catalina	CSS	·	930 m	MPC · JPL

== 198901–199000 ==
back to top

Designation			Discovery			Properties		Ref
Permanent	Provisional	Named after	Date	Site	Discoverer(s)	Category	Diam.	Ref
198901	2005 UX_{30}	—	October 24, 2005	Kitt Peak	Spacewatch	·	660 m	MPC · JPL
198902	2005 UE_{32}	—	October 24, 2005	Kitt Peak	Spacewatch	·	1.1 km	MPC · JPL
198903	2005 UA_{33}	—	October 24, 2005	Kitt Peak	Spacewatch	·	1.4 km	MPC · JPL
198904	2005 UH_{33}	—	October 24, 2005	Kitt Peak	Spacewatch	NYS	1.4 km	MPC · JPL
198905	2005 UJ_{33}	—	October 24, 2005	Kitt Peak	Spacewatch	·	840 m	MPC · JPL
198906	2005 UL_{38}	—	October 24, 2005	Kitt Peak	Spacewatch	·	1.3 km	MPC · JPL
198907	2005 UO_{40}	—	October 24, 2005	Kitt Peak	Spacewatch	NYS	2.0 km	MPC · JPL
198908	2005 UZ_{41}	—	October 25, 2005	Kitt Peak	Spacewatch	·	1.0 km	MPC · JPL
198909	2005 UZ_{49}	—	October 23, 2005	Catalina	CSS	·	960 m	MPC · JPL
198910	2005 UX_{59}	—	October 25, 2005	Anderson Mesa	LONEOS	·	1.2 km	MPC · JPL
198911	2005 UM_{64}	—	October 25, 2005	Catalina	CSS	·	1.1 km	MPC · JPL
198912	2005 UV_{73}	—	October 23, 2005	Palomar	NEAT	·	1.2 km	MPC · JPL
198913	2005 UD_{112}	—	October 22, 2005	Kitt Peak	Spacewatch	·	810 m	MPC · JPL
198914	2005 UE_{112}	—	October 22, 2005	Kitt Peak	Spacewatch	·	1.1 km	MPC · JPL
198915	2005 UZ_{126}	—	October 24, 2005	Kitt Peak	Spacewatch	·	840 m	MPC · JPL
198916	2005 UU_{130}	—	October 24, 2005	Kitt Peak	Spacewatch	·	1.2 km	MPC · JPL
198917	2005 UG_{131}	—	October 24, 2005	Kitt Peak	Spacewatch	·	1.0 km	MPC · JPL
198918	2005 UP_{132}	—	October 24, 2005	Palomar	NEAT	·	990 m	MPC · JPL
198919	2005 UT_{142}	—	October 25, 2005	Mount Lemmon	Mount Lemmon Survey	·	930 m	MPC · JPL
198920	2005 UP_{158}	—	October 30, 2005	Vicques	M. Ory	·	1.4 km	MPC · JPL
198921	2005 US_{160}	—	October 22, 2005	Catalina	CSS	·	1.0 km	MPC · JPL
198922	2005 US_{174}	—	October 24, 2005	Kitt Peak	Spacewatch	·	1.0 km	MPC · JPL
198923	2005 UJ_{180}	—	October 24, 2005	Kitt Peak	Spacewatch	·	2.4 km	MPC · JPL
198924	2005 UA_{181}	—	October 24, 2005	Kitt Peak	Spacewatch	·	800 m	MPC · JPL
198925	2005 UE_{185}	—	October 25, 2005	Mount Lemmon	Mount Lemmon Survey	·	830 m	MPC · JPL
198926	2005 UW_{203}	—	October 25, 2005	Mount Lemmon	Mount Lemmon Survey	·	1.4 km	MPC · JPL
198927	2005 UO_{216}	—	October 25, 2005	Mount Lemmon	Mount Lemmon Survey	·	1.2 km	MPC · JPL
198928	2005 UP_{216}	—	October 25, 2005	Mount Lemmon	Mount Lemmon Survey	PHO	2.1 km	MPC · JPL
198929	2005 UK_{217}	—	October 27, 2005	Mount Lemmon	Mount Lemmon Survey	·	1.3 km	MPC · JPL
198930	2005 UW_{241}	—	October 25, 2005	Kitt Peak	Spacewatch	·	1.5 km	MPC · JPL
198931	2005 UP_{242}	—	October 25, 2005	Kitt Peak	Spacewatch	·	790 m	MPC · JPL
198932	2005 UX_{243}	—	October 25, 2005	Kitt Peak	Spacewatch	(1338) (FLO)	820 m	MPC · JPL
198933	2005 UY_{249}	—	October 22, 2005	Kitt Peak	Spacewatch	·	1.2 km	MPC · JPL
198934	2005 UR_{251}	—	October 24, 2005	Kitt Peak	Spacewatch	·	880 m	MPC · JPL
198935	2005 UO_{253}	—	October 27, 2005	Palomar	NEAT	V	900 m	MPC · JPL
198936	2005 US_{260}	—	October 25, 2005	Kitt Peak	Spacewatch	·	1.9 km	MPC · JPL
198937	2005 UX_{263}	—	October 27, 2005	Kitt Peak	Spacewatch	·	880 m	MPC · JPL
198938	2005 US_{273}	—	October 28, 2005	Mount Lemmon	Mount Lemmon Survey	·	2.0 km	MPC · JPL
198939	2005 UG_{276}	—	October 24, 2005	Kitt Peak	Spacewatch	·	1.1 km	MPC · JPL
198940	2005 UA_{279}	—	October 24, 2005	Kitt Peak	Spacewatch	·	980 m	MPC · JPL
198941	2005 UV_{281}	—	October 25, 2005	Mount Lemmon	Mount Lemmon Survey	·	1.1 km	MPC · JPL
198942	2005 UW_{289}	—	October 26, 2005	Kitt Peak	Spacewatch	·	2.2 km	MPC · JPL
198943	2005 UZ_{290}	—	October 26, 2005	Kitt Peak	Spacewatch	·	1.1 km	MPC · JPL
198944	2005 UM_{292}	—	October 26, 2005	Kitt Peak	Spacewatch	·	1.2 km	MPC · JPL
198945	2005 UQ_{296}	—	October 26, 2005	Kitt Peak	Spacewatch	·	1.0 km	MPC · JPL
198946	2005 UB_{297}	—	October 26, 2005	Kitt Peak	Spacewatch	NYS	1.5 km	MPC · JPL
198947	2005 UR_{298}	—	October 26, 2005	Kitt Peak	Spacewatch	·	1.1 km	MPC · JPL
198948	2005 UB_{308}	—	October 27, 2005	Mount Lemmon	Mount Lemmon Survey	·	670 m	MPC · JPL
198949	2005 UG_{322}	—	October 27, 2005	Kitt Peak	Spacewatch	·	1.7 km	MPC · JPL
198950	2005 UW_{327}	—	October 29, 2005	Catalina	CSS	·	1.2 km	MPC · JPL
198951	2005 UJ_{330}	—	October 28, 2005	Kitt Peak	Spacewatch	MAS	850 m	MPC · JPL
198952	2005 UR_{346}	—	October 30, 2005	Kitt Peak	Spacewatch	·	1.5 km	MPC · JPL
198953	2005 US_{348}	—	October 23, 2005	Catalina	CSS	·	1.2 km	MPC · JPL
198954	2005 UE_{350}	—	October 27, 2005	Catalina	CSS	·	1.2 km	MPC · JPL
198955	2005 UJ_{355}	—	October 29, 2005	Catalina	CSS	·	930 m	MPC · JPL
198956	2005 UL_{355}	—	October 29, 2005	Catalina	CSS	·	1.3 km	MPC · JPL
198957	2005 UN_{378}	—	October 29, 2005	Kitt Peak	Spacewatch	·	800 m	MPC · JPL
198958	2005 UY_{379}	—	October 29, 2005	Mount Lemmon	Mount Lemmon Survey	·	980 m	MPC · JPL
198959	2005 UU_{382}	—	October 27, 2005	Socorro	LINEAR	·	4.4 km	MPC · JPL
198960	2005 US_{425}	—	October 28, 2005	Kitt Peak	Spacewatch	·	1 km	MPC · JPL
198961	2005 UC_{430}	—	October 28, 2005	Kitt Peak	Spacewatch	·	900 m	MPC · JPL
198962	2005 UJ_{435}	—	October 29, 2005	Mount Lemmon	Mount Lemmon Survey	·	910 m	MPC · JPL
198963 Robsnyder	2005 UA_{438}	Robsnyder	October 27, 2005	Mount Lemmon	Mount Lemmon Survey	·	1.2 km	MPC · JPL
198964	2005 UC_{439}	—	October 28, 2005	Mount Lemmon	Mount Lemmon Survey	·	1.1 km	MPC · JPL
198965	2005 UC_{442}	—	October 29, 2005	Socorro	LINEAR	·	2.3 km	MPC · JPL
198966	2005 UR_{444}	—	October 30, 2005	Mount Lemmon	Mount Lemmon Survey	·	1.1 km	MPC · JPL
198967	2005 UT_{445}	—	October 31, 2005	Mount Lemmon	Mount Lemmon Survey	·	1.1 km	MPC · JPL
198968 Sparke	2005 UF_{506}	Sparke	October 24, 2005	Mauna Kea	D. J. Tholen	·	3.3 km	MPC · JPL
198969	2005 UJ_{508}	—	October 25, 2005	Kitt Peak	Spacewatch	·	1.7 km	MPC · JPL
198970	2005 UP_{508}	—	October 28, 2005	Mount Lemmon	Mount Lemmon Survey	NYS	1.3 km	MPC · JPL
198971 Whitacre	2005 UU_{512}	Whitacre	October 31, 2005	Mauna Kea	D. J. Tholen	·	2.6 km	MPC · JPL
198972	2005 UB_{527}	—	October 27, 2005	Mount Lemmon	Mount Lemmon Survey	·	1.9 km	MPC · JPL
198973	2005 VO_{3}	—	November 6, 2005	Ottmarsheim	C. Rinner	·	710 m	MPC · JPL
198974	2005 VN_{4}	—	November 6, 2005	Ottmarsheim	C. Rinner	·	1.0 km	MPC · JPL
198975	2005 VO_{9}	—	November 1, 2005	Kitt Peak	Spacewatch	·	800 m	MPC · JPL
198976	2005 VS_{15}	—	November 2, 2005	Socorro	LINEAR	·	1.0 km	MPC · JPL
198977	2005 VD_{16}	—	November 2, 2005	Socorro	LINEAR	PHO	2.6 km	MPC · JPL
198978	2005 VT_{29}	—	November 4, 2005	Kitt Peak	Spacewatch	·	1.0 km	MPC · JPL
198979	2005 VF_{30}	—	November 4, 2005	Kitt Peak	Spacewatch	·	700 m	MPC · JPL
198980	2005 VW_{30}	—	November 4, 2005	Kitt Peak	Spacewatch	·	960 m	MPC · JPL
198981	2005 VK_{35}	—	November 3, 2005	Mount Lemmon	Mount Lemmon Survey	·	2.0 km	MPC · JPL
198982	2005 VL_{44}	—	November 3, 2005	Mount Lemmon	Mount Lemmon Survey	·	890 m	MPC · JPL
198983	2005 VY_{64}	—	November 1, 2005	Mount Lemmon	Mount Lemmon Survey	·	1.1 km	MPC · JPL
198984	2005 VJ_{67}	—	November 1, 2005	Mount Lemmon	Mount Lemmon Survey	·	1.6 km	MPC · JPL
198985	2005 VH_{73}	—	November 1, 2005	Mount Lemmon	Mount Lemmon Survey	·	890 m	MPC · JPL
198986	2005 VB_{82}	—	November 6, 2005	Mount Lemmon	Mount Lemmon Survey	·	1.1 km	MPC · JPL
198987	2005 VY_{86}	—	November 5, 2005	Kitt Peak	Spacewatch	·	3.1 km	MPC · JPL
198988	2005 VN_{99}	—	November 1, 2005	Anderson Mesa	LONEOS	·	1.3 km	MPC · JPL
198989 Valeriethomas	2005 VT_{101}	Valeriethomas	November 2, 2005	Mount Lemmon	Mount Lemmon Survey	·	2.2 km	MPC · JPL
198990	2005 VS_{110}	—	November 6, 2005	Mount Lemmon	Mount Lemmon Survey	·	950 m	MPC · JPL
198991	2005 VQ_{116}	—	November 11, 2005	Kitt Peak	Spacewatch	·	1.1 km	MPC · JPL
198992	2005 VL_{124}	—	November 7, 2005	Mauna Kea	Mauna Kea	·	1.6 km	MPC · JPL
198993 Époigny	2005 WE_{5}	Époigny	November 20, 2005	Nogales	J.-C. Merlin	·	790 m	MPC · JPL
198994	2005 WL_{18}	—	November 22, 2005	Kitt Peak	Spacewatch	·	710 m	MPC · JPL
198995	2005 WM_{25}	—	November 21, 2005	Kitt Peak	Spacewatch	·	810 m	MPC · JPL
198996	2005 WJ_{36}	—	November 22, 2005	Kitt Peak	Spacewatch	·	1.8 km	MPC · JPL
198997	2005 WT_{36}	—	November 22, 2005	Kitt Peak	Spacewatch	·	700 m	MPC · JPL
198998	2005 WO_{41}	—	November 21, 2005	Kitt Peak	Spacewatch	·	880 m	MPC · JPL
198999	2005 WR_{44}	—	November 22, 2005	Kitt Peak	Spacewatch	·	2.1 km	MPC · JPL
199000	2005 WW_{45}	—	November 22, 2005	Kitt Peak	Spacewatch	·	1.1 km	MPC · JPL

back to top

== See also ==
- Meanings of minor-planet names: 198001–199000
