= 2021 in Turkey =

- Centuries: 20th; 21st
- Decades: 2000s; 2010s; 2020s; 2030s
- See also: List of years in Turkey

Individuals and events related to Turkey in 2021.

== Incumbents ==
- President: Recep Tayyip Erdoğan
- 29th Speaker of the Grand National Assembly: Mustafa Şentop
- President of the Constitutional Court: Zühtü Arslan
- Chief of the Turkish General Staff of the Armed Forces: Yaşar Güler
- Government: 66th government of Turkey
- Cabinet: Fourth Erdoğan Cabinet

== Events ==
=== Ongoing ===
- COVID-19 pandemic in Turkey
- 2016–present purges in Turkey
- 2018–2022 Turkish currency and debt crisis

=== January ===
- 1 January:
  - The minister of health, Fahrettin Koca, announces the identification of the first mutated COVID-19 case in Turkey, which had originated from the United Kingdom.
  - The over-the-top media service Exxen is made available to the public.
- 4 January: 2021 Boğaziçi University protests - Students protest Melih Bulu's appointment as the rector of Boğaziçi University.
- 8 January: Türksat 5A satellite is launched at 02:15:00 UTC from Cape Canaveral (CCSFS), SLC-40.
- 10 January: An earthquake with a moment magnitude of 4.5 hits Ankara's Kalecik district at 10:53 pm local time.
- 13 January: The Medicines and Medical Devices Agency approves CoronaVac for emergency use. The minister of health was the first person to get vaccinated.
- 14 January: President Recep Tayyip Erdoğan receives the COVID-19 vaccine.

=== February ===
- 9 February: Recep Tayyip Erdoğan announces the National Space Program.
- 10–14 February: The Turkish cross-border Operation Claw-Eagle 2 takes place in Iraq, during which 13 prisoners of the Kurdistan Workers' Party (PKK) died.

=== March ===
- 1 March: Normalization and easing of COVID restrictions starts gradually in provinces, divided into 4 categories according to the risk assessment criteria.
- 2 March: Erdoğan announces the Human Rights Action Plan.
- 4 March: A Eurocopter AS532 Cougar crashes on its way from Bingöl to Tatvan. Eleven soldiers on board, as well as 8th Corps Commander Osman Erbaş, are killed in the crash.
- 10 March: The foundation of the 3rd reactor is laid at the Akkuyu Nuclear Power Plant at the virtual ceremony attended by Erdoğan and Russian president Vladimir Putin.
- 12 March: Erdoğan announces the Economic Reform package.
- 20 March: Erdoğan announces his country's withdrawal from the Istanbul Convention by a presidential decree published in the official government gazette. Turkey becomes the first country to withdraw from it.

=== April ===
- 4 April: A statement is issued by 104 admirals who retired from the Turkish Naval Forces, to warn about potential failure by the government to follow and obey the Montreux Convention, the Istanbul Canal project and Atatürk's principles and reforms.
- 7 April: An NF-5 aircraft belonging to the Turkish Stars crashes due to an unknown reason during a training flight in the Karatay district of Konya. The pilot of the plane, Captain Burak Gençcelep, is killed.
- 14 April: Beginning at 7 pm, a 2-week partial curfew starts to be enforced. Limitations are imposed as a result of the increasing number of COVID-19 cases in many areas, with curfew restrictions added to cover the entire weekend and between 7 pm - 5 am on weekdays.
- 29 April: A full closure is announced starting from 29 April at 7 pm until 17 May at 5 am. Education is suspended at all levels and exams were postponed. It is announced that intercity public transport vehicles will operate at 50% capacity. It is also announced that markets will be closed on Sundays.

=== June ===
- 4 June: Erdoğan announces the discovery of 135 billion m^{3} of natural gas in the Black Sea.

=== July ===
- 28 July: 2021 Turkey wildfires begin.

=== August ===
- 6 August: The minister of national education Ziya Selçuk resigns and is replaced by Mahmut Özer.
- 11 August
  - An anti-Syrian riot erupts in the capital Ankara after the killing of a Turkish teenager by a Syrian refugee.
  - Flash floods in the Black Sea Region kill at least 38 people.
- 14 August: General Directorate of Forestry announced that a firefighting plane rented from Russia crashed in Kahramanmaraş. All the crew, consisting of 3 Turkish and 5 Russian citizens, are killed.

=== September ===
- 21 and 26 September: Teknofest 2021 was held at the Atatürk Airport.

=== October ===
- 6 October: The Paris Agreement was approved by the TBMM.
- 29 October: Atatürk Cultural Center was reopened after a series of reconstructions.

=== November ===
- 29–30 November: Due to the severe storm that occurred in the Marmara, Aegean and Western Black Sea regions, 7 people lost their lives and more than 50 people were injured.

=== December ===
- 10 December: Expo 2021 Hatay will take place in Hatay city center and will continue until 30 May 2022.
- 15–19 December: The 2021 FIVB Volleyball Women's Club World Championship was held in Ankara.
- 19 December: Türksat 5B satellite was launched into space from Cape Canaveral at 06:58 with a Falcon 9 rocket.
- 22 December: The coronavirus vaccine TURKOVAC was authorized for emergency use.

== Deaths ==
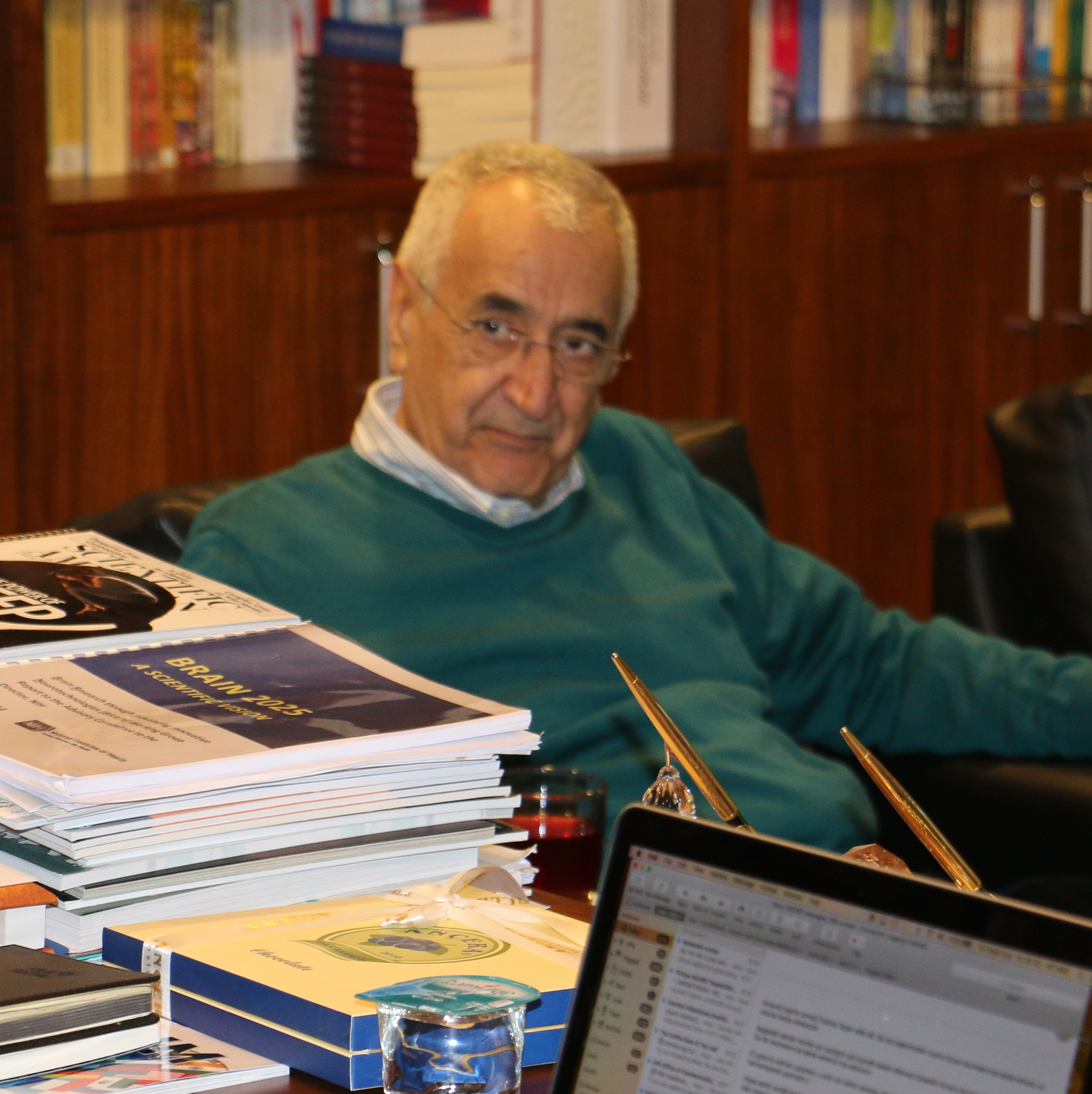
Doğan Cüceloğlu

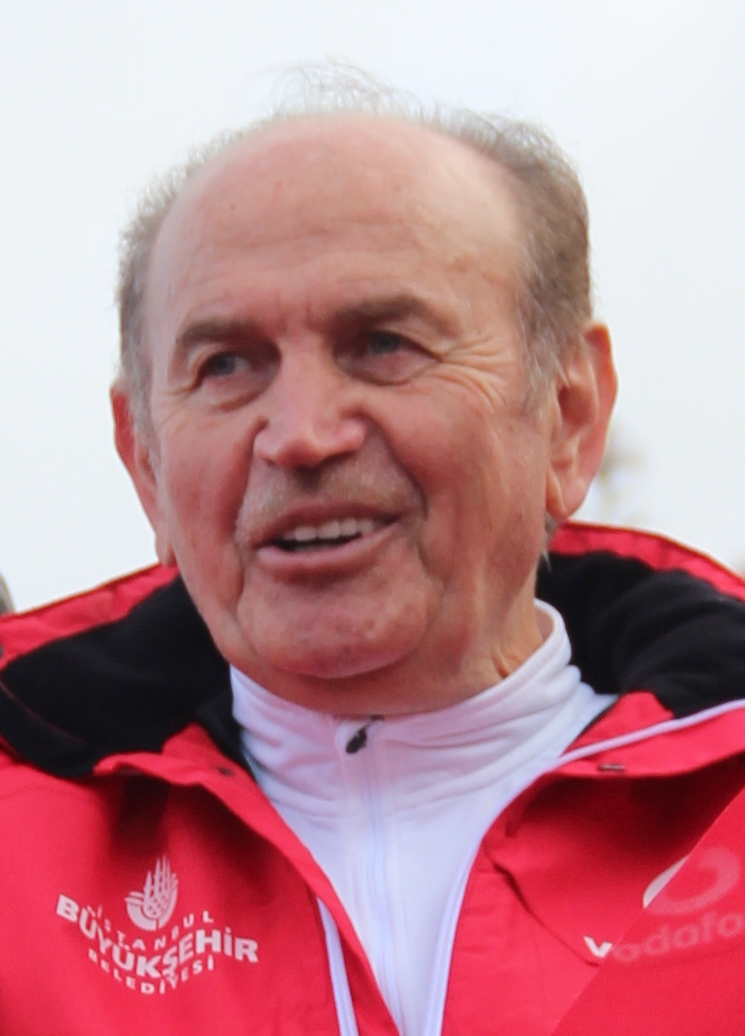
Kadir Topbaş

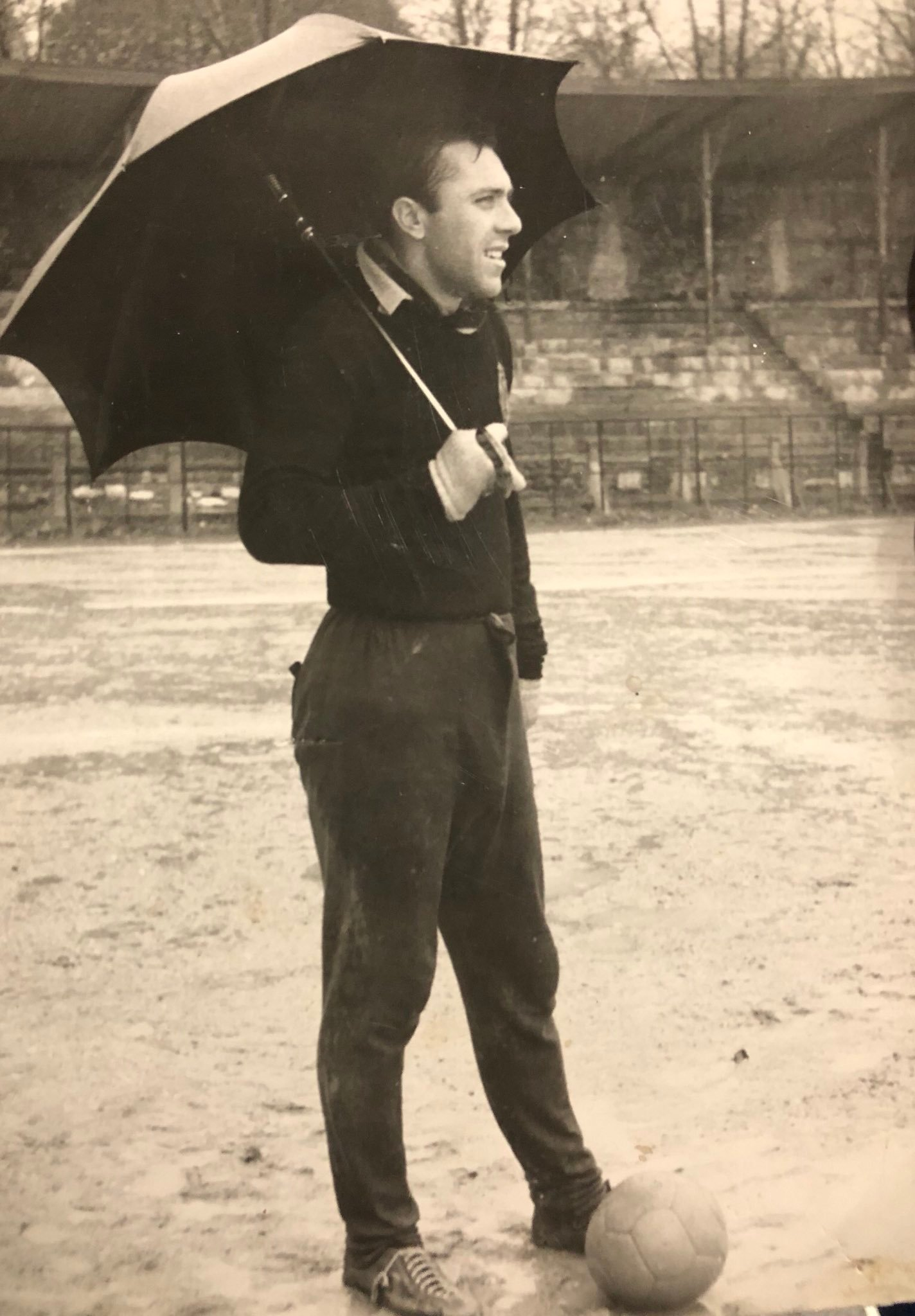
Özcan Arkoç

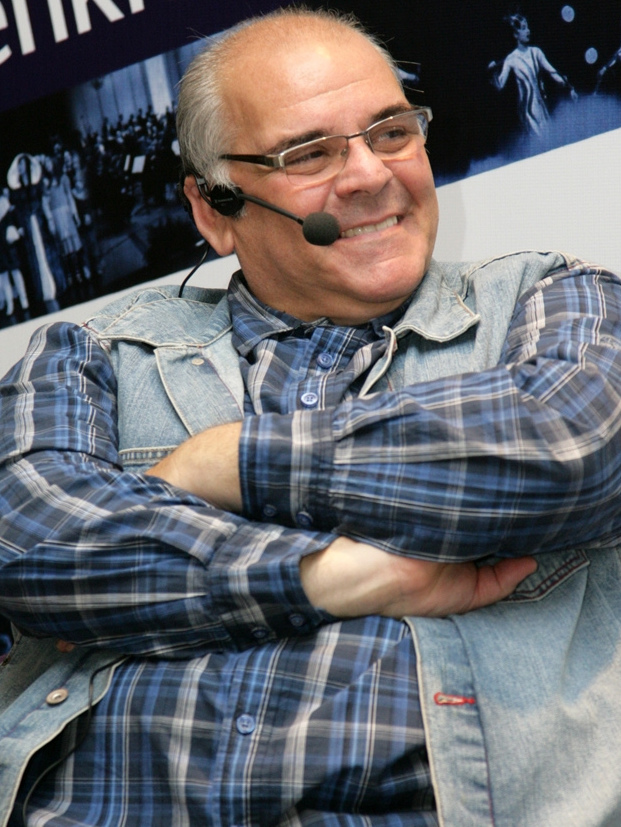
Rasim Öztekin

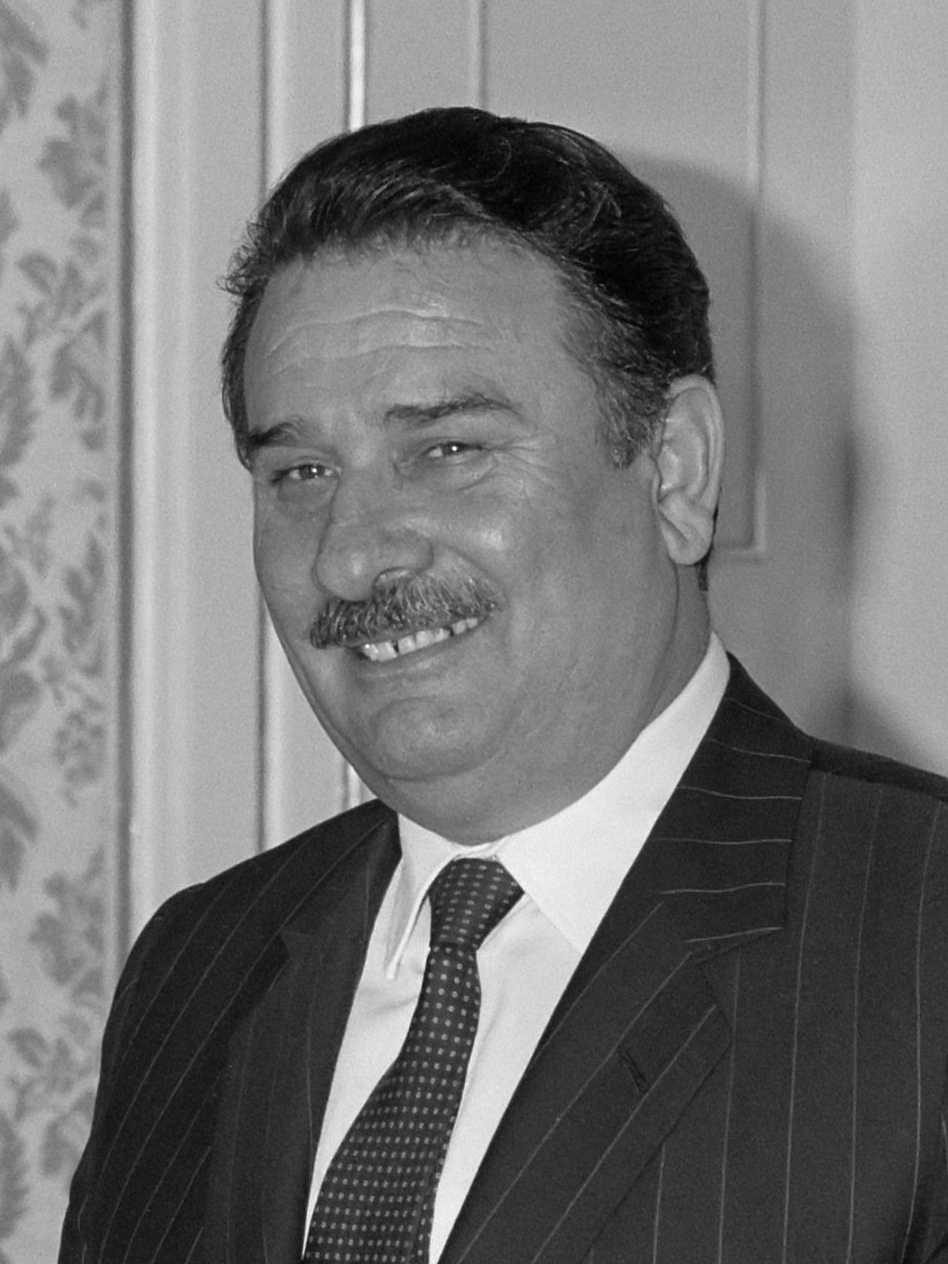
Yıldırım Akbulut

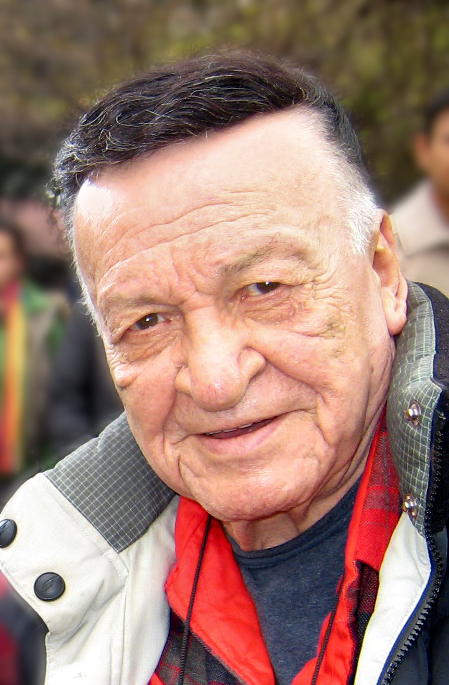
Kartal Tibet

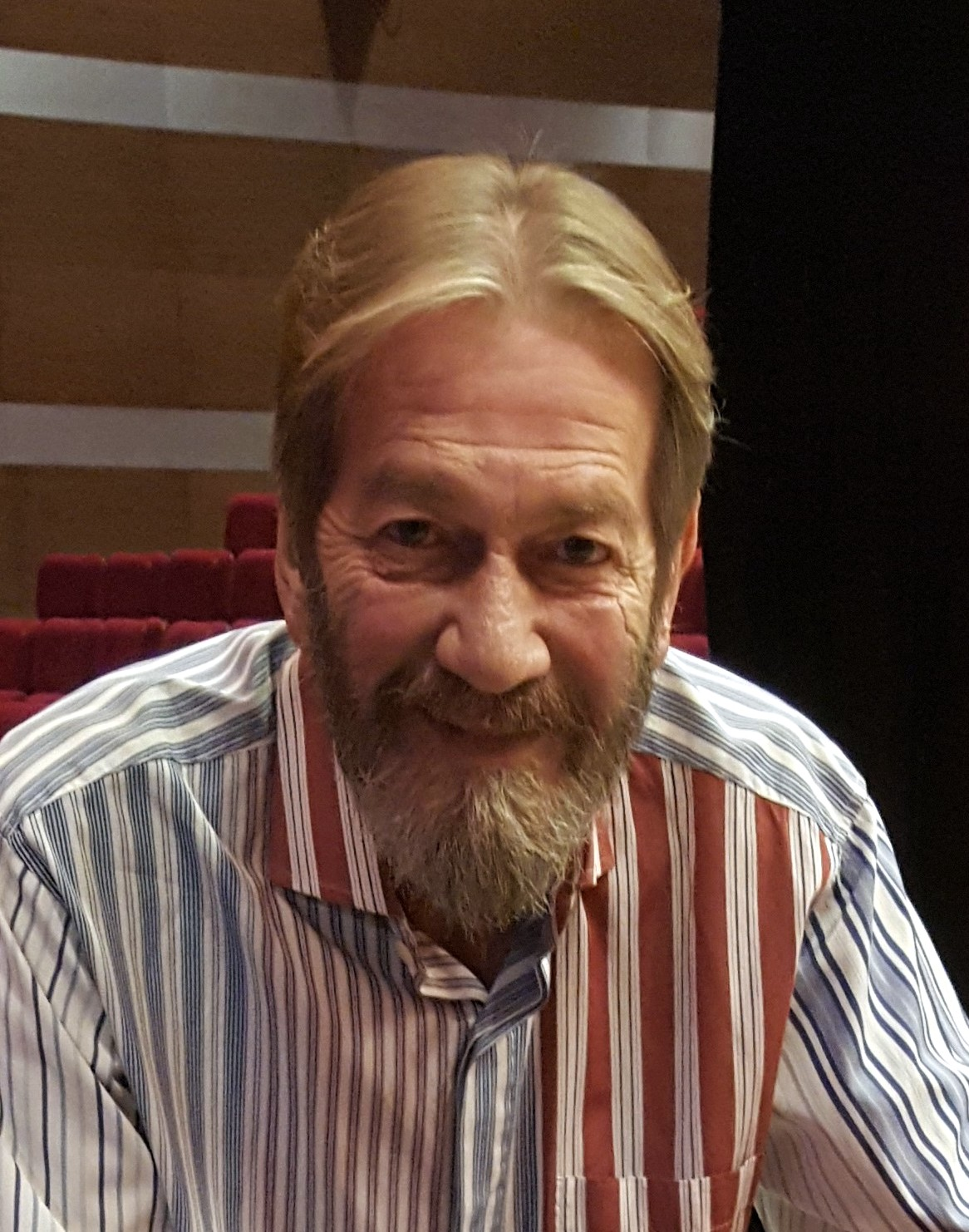
Ferhan Şensoy

=== January ===
- 2 January - Aylin Özmenek, journalist (b. 1942)
- 10 January - Ahmet Vefik Alp, architect and politician (b. 1948)
- 16 January - Muammer Sun, composer and music teacher (b. 1932)
- 18 January - Dündar Ali Osmanoğlu, 45th Head of the House of Osman (b. 1930)
- 29 January - Varol Ürkmez, footballer (b. 1937)

=== February ===
- 4 February - Hüner Coşkuner, singer (b. 1963)
- 9 February - Doğan Cüceloğlu, psychologists and writer (b. 1938)
- 13 February - Kadir Topbaş, Previous Mayor of Istanbul (b. 1945)
- 17 February - Özcan Arkoç, footballer (b. 1939)
- 20 February - Serpil Barlas, actress and singer (b. 1957)
- 21 February - Abdülkadir Topkaç, astronomer (b. 1954)

=== March ===
- 4 March - Osman Erbaş, army officer (b. 1962)
- 5 March - Suna Tanaltay, writer, poet and psychologist (b. 1933)
- 8 March - Rasim Öztekin, actor (b. 1959)
- 16 March - Erhan Önal, footballer (b. 1957)
- 18 March - Mehmet Genç, historian (b. 1934)

=== April ===
- 10 April - Mehtap Ar, actress (b. 1957)
- 14 April - Yıldırım Akbulut, Turkish politician (b. 1935)
- 18 April - Necdet Üruğ, General (b. 1921)
- 22 April - Selma Gürbüz, painter and sculptor (b. 1960)
- 23 April - Tuncay Becedek, footballer (b. 1942)

=== May ===
- 5 May - Emine Işınsu, writer (b. 1938)
- 19 May - Oğuz Yılmaz, singer and songwriter (b. 1968)

=== June ===
- 2 June - Hasan Saltık, record producer (b. 1964)
- 14 June - Selçuk Tekay, composer and musician (b. 1953)

=== July ===
- 1 July - Kartal Tibet, actor, director, screenwriter and producer (b. 1939)
- 22 July - Şevket Sabancı, Businessman and Esas Holding's founder (b. 1936)

=== August ===
- 10 August - Sabina Toziya, actress (b. 1946)
- 25 August - Metin Çekmez, actor (b. 1945)
- 31 August - Ferhan Şensoy, actor, playwright and stage director (b. 1951)

=== September ===
- 10 September - Duygun Yarsuvat, lawyer (b. 1937)
- 22 September - Doğan Kuban, architect (b. 1926)

=== October ===
- 1 October - Oğuzhan Asiltürk, politician (b. 1935)
- 18 October - Sami Kohen, journalist and columnist (b. 1928)
- 31 October - Doğan Akhanlı, Writer (b. 1957)

=== November ===
- 1 November - Semra Dinçer, actress (b. 1965)
- 16 November - Sezai Karakoç, writer, thinker, community leader, and poet (b. 1933)
- 23 November - Hasan Fehmi Güneş, jurist and politician (b. 1934)
- 28 November - Mustafa Cengiz, businessman (b. 1949)

=== December ===
- 3 December - Güldal Akşit, politician (b. 1960)
- 5 December - Osman Arpacıoğlu, footballer (b. 1947)
- 6 December - Teoman Duralı, philosopher, thinker and academician (b. 1947)
- 11 December - Mecnur Çolak, footballer (b. 1967)

== See also ==
- Outline of Turkey
- Index of Turkey-related articles
- List of Turkey-related topics
- History of Turkey
