= K M Asad =

Bangladeshi photojournalist

- কে এম আসাদ
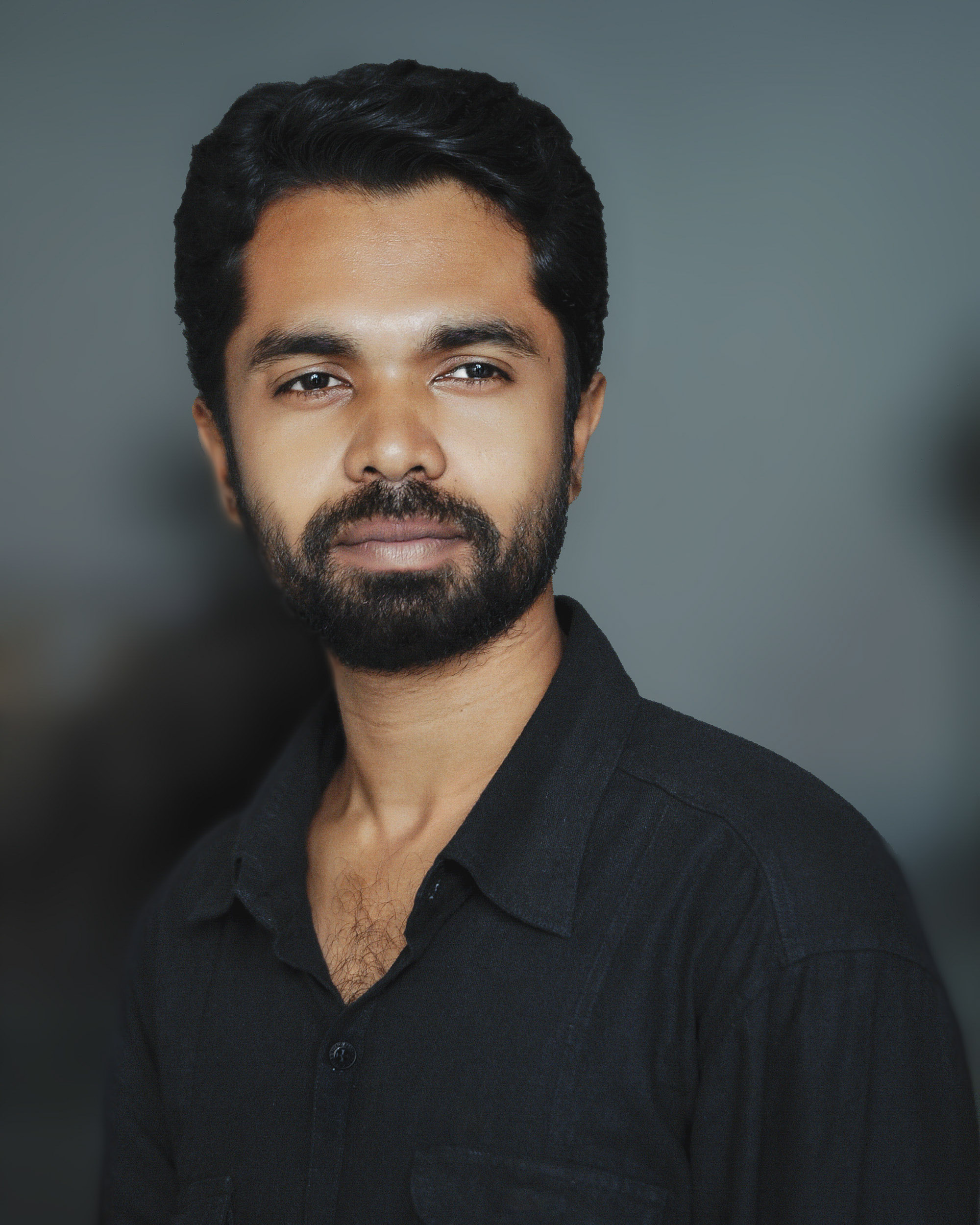
- Born: 1983 (age 42–43); Dhaka, Bangladesh
- Occupation: Photojournalist
- Years active: 2004–present
- Agent: Zuma Press
- Known for: Documentary photography, photojournalism
- Awards: 3rd Prize, Singles, Environment category, World Press Photo, 2021
- Website: www.kmasad.com

Khandaker Muhammad Asad (Bengali: খন্দকার মোহাম্মদ আসাদ; born 1983), known as K M Asad, is a Bangladeshi documentary photographer and photojournalist. He works a photojournalist at Zuma Press news agency and contributor photographer for Getty images. He won a 3rd Prize award at the 2021 World Press Photo for his Climate Crisis Solutions: Collecting Drinking Water in Kalabogi.

== Early life ==
Asad graduated with a degree in photography from Pathshala (The South Asian Media Academy) in 2008.

== Career ==
In 2007, when Cyclone Sidr hit Bangladesh, Asad went to remote places to capture the conditions of local people. He also covered the 7.8 earthquake in Nepal in 2015.

His work has been published by The Guardian, Time, CNN, BBC, New Internationalist, The New York Times, Asia Time, The Telegraph, Days Japan, Paris Match, National Geographic (August 2019 cover picture) Discovery Channel magazine, Feature shoot, The Wall Street Journal, Saudi Aramco world magazine, MSNBC and Smithsonian.

He also works independently as a photojournalist at Zuma Press news agency and contributor photographer for Getty images.

== Awards ==
- 2013, Pictures of the Year International (POYI) News picture story- Freelance/Agency –"First Place"
- 2014, Sony World Photography Awards professional current affair – Shortlist
- 2014, Deeper perspective photographer of the year award organized by International Photography Awards (IPA) – Winner
- 2016, CBRE UPOTY Urban Photographer of the Year – Asia regional winner
- 2017, "Sente Antu Cup" International Photo Contest by Global Photography – Winner.
- 2017, Shining a Light: Experiences of Refugee Women International Photography Contest exhibition Organized by Muhammad Ali Center – Winner.
- 2017, Allard Prize for International Integrity – Winner
- 2017, UNICEF photo of the year 2017 – "Second Place"
- 2017–2018, Hamdan International Photography Award (HIPA) 'The Moment' Category winner – 1st Place
- 2018, International Photography Awards Deeper Perspective – 3rd Place
- 2018, International Photography Awards Editorial Photo Essay and Feature Story – 1st Place
- 2018, The Alfred Fried Photography Award - Special Award of the Jury
- 2018, FOTODOC Center for Documentary Photography Direct Look photo contest The Conflict category – 3rd Place
- 2018, Siena International Photo AwardsSiena International Photo Awards – "Photographer of the Year 2018"
- 2021, 3rd Prize, Singles, Environment category, World Press Photo
