= Presidential Culture and Arts Grand Awards =

Presidential Culture and Arts Grand Awards of Turkey

Presidential Culture and Arts Grand Awards (Turkish: Cumhurbaşkanlığı Kültür ve Sanat Büyük Ödülleri) are the annual awards awarded by Presidency of Turkey.

== List of awards ==
=== 1995-1999 ===
The following awards have been presented by Süleyman Demirel.

1995	Burhan Doğançay	Adalet Ağaoğlu	Şefika Kutluer
1996	Cahit Külebi	Yekta Kara	Arif Sağ
1997	Turhan Selçuk	Lütfi Ömer Akad	Hayrettin Karaca
1998	Yıldız Kenter	Fikret Otyam	Istanbul Foundation for Culture and Arts (İKSV)
1999	Nevzat Atlığ	Turgut Özakman	Rengim Gökmen

=== 2005 ===
The following awards have been presented by Ahmet Necdet Sezer.

- Halil İnalcık
- Oktay Akbal
- Ferruh Başağa
- Ara Güler
- Sevda-Cenap And Music Foundation

=== 2008-2013 ===
The following awards have been presented by Abdullah Gül.

Years	Literature	Traditional arts	Institute of Culture and Arts	Others
2008	Yaşar Kemal	–	–	Architecture: Turgut Cansever, Music: Alaeddin Yavaşca
2009	–	Uğur Derman	Güler Sabancı on behalf of Sakıp Sabancı Museum	Cinema: Nuri Bilge Ceylan
2010	–	–	Oya Eczacıbaşı on behalf of Istanbul Modern	History: Cemal Kafadar, Painting: Ergin İnan
2011	Sezai Karakoç	Hasan Çelebi	–	Criticism: Doğan Hızlan, Art history: Semavi Eyice
2012	Selim İleri	Ahmet Hatipoğlu	–	Archaeology: Zeugma ancient city and museum, Art history: Şükrü Hanioğlu
2013	İskender Pala	–	Union Of Historical Towns	Islamic sciences: Fuat Sezgin, Social sciences: Daron Acemoglu, Documentary: Bekir Karlığa, Music: Ahmet Kaya

=== 2014-2026 ===
The following awards have been presented by Recep Tayyip Erdoğan. Traditionally, fidelity/loyalty awards are awarded posthumously.

	Cinema	Music	Literature	Social Sciences and History	Traditional Arts	Fidelity	Others
2014	Hülya Koçyiğit	Niyazi Sayın	Alev Alatlı	Engin Akarlı	—	—	Institution: Turkey Diyanet Foundation Encyclopedia of Islam
2015	Münir Özkul	Orhan Gencebay	Rasim Özdenören	Mehmet Genç	Hüseyin Kutlu	Cemil Meriç	—
2016	Şener Şen	Erol Parlak	Mustafa Kutlu	Kemal Haşim Karpat	Feridun Özgören, Süheyl Ünver	—	—
2017	Yavuz Turgul	Göksel Baktagir	—	İlber Ortaylı	Ali Toy	Nurettin Topçu	Painting: Selahattin Kara
2018	Türker İnanoğlu	Erol Sayan	—	Mehmet İpşirli	—	Mehmet Akif Ersoy	Photography: İzzet Keribar
2019	Mesut Uçakan	MFÖ	Nuri Pakdil	Ahmet Yaşar Ocak	Fuat Başar	Ahmet Haluk Dursun	Painting: Devrim Erbil, Architecture: Doğan Kuban
2020	Derviş Zaim	Özdemir Erdoğan	İbrahim Tenekeci	Social sciences: İsmail Kara; Cultural History: Sadettin Ökten	—	Necmeddin Okyay	Collection: Mehmet Çebi
2021	Cüneyt Arkın	İdil Biret	Gürbüz Azak	Teoman Duralı	Calligraphy: Etem Çalışkan	Kemal Tahir	Visual arts: Alev Ebuzziya; Used bookstore: İbrahim Manav
2022	Yılmaz Erdoğan	Ajda Pekkan	Yavuz Bülent Bakiler	—	Gülbün Mesara	Âşık Veysel Şatıroğlu	Painting: Süleyman Saim Tekcan, Theatre: Ayla Algan, Science-culture: Hayreddin Karaman, Caricature–animation: Varol Yaşaroğlu, Gastronomy: Ömür Akkor and Yunus Emre Akkor, Dance-ballet: Tan Sağtürk, Architecture: Hilmi Şenalp, Craftsmanship: Sevan Bıçakçı
2023	Sami Şekeroğlu	Emel Sayın	Nazan Bekiroğlu	—	—	Attilâ İlhan, Barış Manço, Samiha Ayverdi, Muhsin Ertuğrul and İsmail Hakkı Uzunçarşılı	Science: Süleyman Uludağ, Culture: Ali Birinci, Art: İlhami Atalay, Caricature: Hasan Aycın, Digital arts: Refik Anadol, Architecture: Sinan Genim
2024	Göksel Arsoy	Ahmet Özhan	Fatma Karabıyık Barbarosoğlu	—	Salih Balakbabalar	Halit Refiğ	Science and Culture: Gönül Tekin and Günay Kut, Theatre: Turan Oflazoğlu, Librarian: Ramazan Minder
2025	—	Yalçın Tura	—	—	—	—	Science and culture: Süleyman Seyfi Öğün, Art: Yalçın Gökçebağ, Anatolian archaeology: Fahri Işık, Photography: Ali Jadallah
2026	Burçak Evren	Gönül Paçacı	Sibel Eraslan	—	İlhami Turan	Ehmedê Xanî	Science and culture: Sabri Koz
