= Galitz =

Galitz is a Jewish surname indicating the origin of the family, of Galitzianer Jews.

Notable people with the surname include:

- Sandra Galitz, birth name of Sandy Stewart (singer)
- Robert Galitz, founder of German publishing house (de:Dölling und Galitz Verlag)
- Roie Galitz, Israeli photographer, entrepreneur, and environmental activist
