= Edwin Ong Wee Kee =

Malaysia Photographer

- Born: 1974 (age 51–52); Sibu, Sarawak, Malaysia
- Known for: Photographer

Edwin Ong Wee Kee (born in 1974 in Sibu, Malaysia) is a Malaysian photographer and a traditional Chinese medicine physician. Ong shot to fame when he became the first Malaysian to win the grand prize of the 8th Hamdan International Photography Award.

== Career ==
Ong describes himself as a keen enthusiast, his full time profession is as a traditional Chinese medicine physician. He is a late bloomer and his interest in photography only started in 2010. Since then, he has taken part in numerous photography contests organised locally and internationally. He is a holder of MPSA (Master of Photographic Society of America) since 2018 as well as a life member of the Photographic Society of Sibu for which he once served as a vice president.

In 2019, he became the first Malaysian to win the grand prize of the 8th Hamdan International Photography Award. Later media reports that the winning photograph may have been staged. Ong dismissed the accusation and said that the photo was taken spontaneously.
