= Salwan (disambiguation) =

Salwan or سلوان may refer to:

== Places ==
- Salwan, Haryana, a village in Haryana, India
- Salwan Public School, a school in New Delhi, India
- Selouane, a town in Oriental Province, Morocco
- Silwan, neighborhood of East Jerusalem

== Name ==
=== Given name ===
- Salwan (given name), an Arabic masculine given name

=== Surname ===
- Raj Salwan (fl. 2024–present), American politician
