= Jarque (disambiguation) =

Jarque may refer to:

== Places ==
- Jarque, a municipality in Zaragoza, Spain
- Jarque de la Val, a municipality in Teruel, Spain
- Hinojosa de Jarque, a municipality in Teruel, Spain
- Mezquita de Jarque, a municipality in Teruel, Spain

== People ==
- Carlos Jarque (born 1954), Mexican economist
- Daniel Jarque (1983–2009), Spanish footballer
- José Francisco Jarque (born 1971), Spanish cyclist
- Pedro Jarque (born 1963), Peruvian wildlife photographer

== Others ==
- The Jarque–Bera test, named after statisticians Carlos M. Jarque and Anil K. Bera
