= Ali Jadallah =

Palestinian photojournalist

Ali Hassan Jadallah
- علي حسن جدالله
- Born: Gaza Strip
- Education: Diploma in Multimedia, University College of Applied Sciences (2010)
- Occupation: Photojournalist
- Years active: 2010–present
- Employer: Anadolu Agency
- Known for: Documenting the Israeli–Palestinian conflict in Gaza
- Awards: Hamdan International Photography Award (2025); Siena International Photo Awards Photographer of the Year (2025); Presidential Culture and Arts Grand Awards (Turkey, 2025); World Press Photo Contest winner (2025)

Ali Hassan Jadallah is a Palestinian photojournalist based in the Gaza Strip. He has documented life, conflict, and resilience in Gaza for more than a decade, covering multiple wars as well as everyday civilian life. His work focuses on the human impact of the Israeli–Palestinian conflict, contributing to a visual record of Gaza's contemporary history. He received Hamdan International Photography Award (HIPA), and the Siena International Photo Awards Photographer of the Year in 2025. Jadallah's photographs have been used in international legal proceedings and have been praised by figures including Turkish President Recep Tayyip Erdoğan.

== Career ==
Jadallah began his career as a photojournalist around 2010, focusing on the Gaza Strip. He has covered three major Israeli military operations in Gaza, documenting both the immediacy of conflict and the everyday resilience of its inhabitants.

Since at least 2013, he has worked for Anadolu Agency, a Turkish state-run news outlet.

His photographs capture themes of destruction, survival, and hope, such as scenes of Ramadan gatherings amid rubble and families fleeing violence.

== Early life and education ==
Ali Hassan Jadallah was born and raised in the Gaza Strip. He earned a diploma in multimedia from the University College of Applied Sciences in Gaza in 2010.

== Awards and recognition ==
- 2025 Hamdan International Photography Award (HIPA), first place in Portfolio (Story-Telling) category for the series ‘"Burden of Survival" (prize: $50,000).
- 2025 Siena International Photo Awards, Photographer of the Year for the image "Irreplaceable" (also known as "Leaving Home").
- 2025 Presidential Culture and Arts Grand Award from Turkey, presented by President Recep Tayyip Erdoğan (accepted by his wife due to travel restrictions).
- 2024 Anadolu Agency Best Photo award for coverage of the Gaza war.
- In 2025, he was also a winner in the World Press Photo Contest for his image of an injured boy at al-Aqsa Hospital.

== Personal life ==
Jadallah has faced significant personal hardships due to the conflict in Gaza. He has lost multiple family members in Israeli airstrikes, including relatives killed in an attack on his home.

He is married, and his wife has represented him at award ceremonies when he could not leave Gaza due to restrictions.
