= Siena International Photo Awards =

Photography competition

- Founded: 2014, Siena, Italy
- Purpose: Photojournalism, story-telling, wildlife photography, underwater photography, street photography, nature photography
- Origins: Italy
- Region served: Global
- Method: Contest, Education
- Key people: Luca Venturi (Founder)
- Website: sipacontest.com

The Siena International Photo Awards (SIPAContest) is a photography competition for professional, amateur and student photographers from around the world. It is judged by an international panel of experts that includes renowned photographers, editors and photography collectors. First presented in 2015, by their second year the awards and the associated Siena Awards Festival in Siena, Italy, were considered prestigious.

According to the organizers, SIPA (Siena International Photo Awards) is part of a broader project of the Siena Awards. It represents an effort to bring together people from around the world who are passionate not only about photography, but also about global connection, cultural exchange, and art as a catalyst for change.

== History ==
Siena International Photo Awards was created by Luca Venturi as part of the mission of the Art Photo Travel Association, a non-profit organization based in Siena, Italy. The awards were first presented on 30 October 2015.

== Award ceremony ==
The awards ceremony takes place in Siena at the Teatro dei Rinnovati theatre. On the day of the ceremony, the Siena International Photographer of the Year and other award-winning images are announced. Following the awards ceremony, the "People Sharing All the World" photography exhibition honoring the winners opens its doors in Siena. A book featuring all prize-winning entries is published annually in two languages (Italian and English).

== Contest ==
The winning images are selected by a professional jury (including photographers from National Geographic and the BBC) from among thousands of entries (2019: approximately 50,000, according to the SIPAContest team), received from all over the world.

The winners in each category will be awarded the Pangea Prize and will compete for the highest award as Photographer of the Year.

An exhibition of the winning and honorable mention images, named "Beyond The Lens," is located each year at the exhibition space of the former distillery "Lo Stellino." In 2019 the exhibition was entitled "Imagine all the people sharing all the world."

A book of winning entries and runners-up has been published each year since 2015.

== Annual Ceremonies and Honorees ==
=== 2025 ===
The 2025 awards ceremony was celebrated at the Teatro dei Rinnovati on the 27th of September.

- Siena International Photographer of the Year – Ali Jadallah (Palestine)
- Best Author – Adrees Latif (United States/Pakistan)
- Category Winners – Storyboard (General News): Ali Jadallah (Palestine), Storyboard (Nature, environment, and conservation issues): Ami Vitale (United States), Storyboard (Daily life and contemporary issues): Jana Margarete Schuler (Germany), Documentary and Photojournalism: David Lombeida (United States), Journeys and Adventures: Jianxing Zhu (China), Fascinating Faces and Characters: Thomas Nicolon (France), The Beauty of Nature: Connor Healey (United States), Animals in their Environment: Sandesh Kadur (India), Sports in Action: Jerome Brouillet (France), Street Photography: Matias Delacroix (Chile), Underwater Life: Shane Gross (Canada), Short Documentary: Roman Willi (Switzerland)

=== 2024 ===
The 2024 awards ceremony was celebrated at the Teatro dei Rinnovati on the 28th of September.

- Siena International Photographer of the Year – Ali Jadallah (Palestine)
- Best Author – Nicola "Ókin" Frioli (Italy)
- Category Winners – Storyboard (General News): Mustafa Hassona (Palestine), Storyboard (Nature, environment, and conservation issues): Pasquale Vassallo (Italy), Storyboard (Daily life and contemporary issues): Federico Rios (Colombia), Documentary and Photojournalism: Wojciech Grzedzinski (Poland), Journeys and Adventures: Andrew Newey (United Kingdom), Fascinating Faces and Characters: Dan Winters (United States), The Beauty of Nature: Jaime Rojo (Spain), Animals in their Environment: Karine Aigner (United States), Sports in Action: Ryan Pierse (Australia), Street Photography: Ilvy Njiokiktjien (The Netherlands), Underwater Life: Karim Iliya (United States), Short Documentary: Christian Tuckwell-Smith (United Kingdom)

=== 2023 ===
The 2023 awards ceremony was celebrated at the Teatro dei Rinnovati on the 30th of September.

- Siena International Photographer of the Year – Salwan Georges (United States)
- Best Author – Wolfgang Schwan (United States)
- Category Winners – Storyboard (General News): Siegfried Modola (Italy), Storyboard (Nature, environment, and conservation issues): Morgan Heim (United States), Storyboard (Daily life and contemporary issues): Laetitia Vançon (France), Documentary and Photojournalism: Andras D. Hajdu (Hungary), Journeys and Adventures: Shyjith Onden Cheriyath (India), Fascinating Faces and Characters: Matt Mcclain (United States), The Beauty of Nature: Fabio Savini (Italy), Animals in their Environment: Torie Hilley (United States), Sports in Action: Samuel Barnes (United Kingdom), Street Photography: Benoit Segalen (France), Under 20: Mobin Shahvaisi (Iran), Underwater Life: Lilian Koh (Singapore), Short Documentary: Ami Vitale (United States)

=== 2022 ===
The 2022 awards ceremony was celebrated at the Teatro dei Rinnovati on the 1st of October.

- Siena International Photographer of the Year – Konstantinos Tsakalidis (Greece)
- Best Author – Peter Mather (Canada)
- Category Winners – Storyboard: Peter Mather (Canada), Documentary and Photojournalism: Fabrizio Maffei (Italy), Journeys and Adventures: Rahat Bin Mustafiz (Bangladesh), Fascinating Faces and Characters: Dan Winters (United States), The Beauty of Nature: Nadine Galandi (Germany), Animals in their Environment: Amos Nachoum (Israel), Architecture and Urban Spaces: Muhammad Almasri (Jordan), Sports in Action: Jonne Roriz (Brazil), Street Photography: Michael Kowalczyk (Germany), Under 20: Raffael Gunawan (Indonesia), Underwater Life: Francisco Javier Murcia Requena (Spain), Short Documentary: Ami Vitale (United States)

=== 2021 ===
The 2021 awards were presented as a virtual event on 23 October.

- Siena International Photographer of the Year – Mehmet Aslan (Turkey)
- Best Author – Brent Stirton (South Africa)
- Category Winners – Storyboard: Brent Stirton (South Africa), Documentary and Photojournalism: Marcus Westberg (Germany), Journeys and Adventures: Sergey Savvi (Russia), Fascinating Faces and Characters: Selene Magnolia (Italy), The Beauty of Nature: Shirley Wung (Taiwan), Animals in their Environment: Ronan Donovan (United States), Architecture and Urban Spaces: Gustav Willeit (Italy), Sports in Action: Anupam Roy Chowdhury (India), Street Photography: Lopamudra Talukdar (India), Under 20: Ben Pulletz (United Kingdom), Short Documentary: Farida Alam (Bangladesh)

=== 2020 ===
The 2020 awards were presented as a virtual event on 25 October.

- Siena International Photographer of the Year – Greg Lecouer (France)
- Best Author – Brent Stirton (South Africa)
- Category Winners – Storyboard: Brent Stirton (South Africa), Documentary and Photojournalism: Mohammad Sazid Hossain (Bangladesh), Journeys and Adventures: Amirmahdi Najafloo Shahpar (Iran), Fascinating Faces and Characters: Silvia Alessi (Italy), The Beauty of Nature: Tobias Friedrich (Germany), Animals in their Environment: Jonas Classon (Sweden), Architecture and Urban Spaces: Attila Balogh (Hungary), Sports in Action: Diogo Cancela (Great Britain), Street Photography: Olesia Kim (Russia), Under 20: Riccardo Marchegiani (Italy), Short Documentary: Nader Saadallah (Egypt)

=== 2019 ===
The 2019 awards ceremony was celebrated at the Teatro dei Rinnovati on 26 October.

- Siena International Photographer of the Year – Jonathan Banks (Great Britain)
- Best Author – Matt McClain (USA)
- Category Winners – Story-Telling: Constanza Portnoy (Argentina), Creative & Still Life: Hardijanto Budiman (Indonesia), Sports In Action: Maxim Korotchenko (Russia), Architecture And Urban Spaces: Elizabeth Jenny Taner (Indonesia), Animals In Their Environment: Will Burrard-Lucas (Great Britain), The Beauty Of The Nature: Ignacio Medem (Spain), Fascinating Faces And Characters: Matt McClain (USA), Journeys And Adventures: Susana Girón (Spain), Photojournalism: Alessio Paduano (Italy), Jump for Joy: Bram Paulussen (Belgium), Under 20: Mohit Khetrapal (India), Short Documentary: Nick Kontostavlakis (Greece)

=== 2018 ===
The 2018 awards ceremony was celebrated at the Teatro dei Rozzi on 27 October.

- Siena International Photographer of the Year – K M Asad (Bangladesh)
- Best Author – Tariq Zaidi (Great Britain)
- Category Winners – Story-Telling: David Chancellor (Great Britain), Splash Of Colors: Sina Falker (Germany), Sports In Action: Pedro Luis Ajuriaguerra Saiz (Spain), Architecture And Urban Spaces: Fyodor Savintsev (Russia), Animals In Their Environment: Amos Nachoum (USA), The Beauty Of The Nature: Francisco Negroni (Chile), Fascinating Faces And Characters: David Nam Lip Lee (Malaysia), Journeys And Adventures: Zach Lowry (USA), General Monochrome: Marcel van Balken (Netherlands), General Color: Klaus Lenzen (Germany), Under 20: Yinzhi Pan (China)

=== 2017 ===
The 2017 awards ceremony was celebrated at the Teatro dei Rozzi on 28 October.

- Siena International Photographer of the Year – Randy Olson (USA)
- Best Author – Ami Vitale (USA)
- Category Winners – Story-Telling: Ami Vitale (USA), Fragile Ice: Roie Galitz (Israel), Sports in Action: Tim Clayton (United Kingdom), Architecture And Urban Spaces: Hans-Martin Doelz (Germany), Animals In Their Environment: Sergey Gorshkov (Russia), The Beauty Of The Nature: James Smart (Australia), Fascinating Faces And Characters: Joao Taborda (Portugal), Journeys And Adventures: Alessandra Meniconzi (Switzerland), General Monochrome: Jack Savage (Great Britain), General Color: Jonathan Bachman (USA), Under 20: Zijie Gong (China)

=== 2016 ===
The 2016 awards ceremony was celebrated at the Teatro dei Rozzi on 29 October. The competition for the 2016 awards began in December 2015.

Judges for the competition included Melissa Farlow of National Geographic. Greg Lecoeur's winning photograph was of gannets diving for sardine off the coast off South Africa. The same photograph won National Geographic's Photographer of the Year contest.

- Siena International Photographer of the Year – Greg Lecoeur (France)
- Best Author – Audun Rikardsen (Norway)
- Category Winners – Story-Telling: Jacob Ehrbahn (Denmark), Wine: Gianluca De Bartolo (Italy), Sports In Action: Audun Rikardsen (Norway), Architecture And Urban Spaces: Mike Hollman (New Zealand), Animals In Their Environment: Audun Rikardsen (Norway), The Beauty Of The Nature: Giuseppe Mario Famiani (Italy), Fascinating Faces And Characters: Jiming Lv (China), Journeys And Adventures: Leyla Emektar (Turkey), General Monochrome: Marcin Ryczek (Poland), General Color: Danny Yen Sin Wong (Malaysia), Student: Krishna Vr (Mexico)

=== 2015 ===
The 2015 awards ceremony was celebrated at the Teatro dei Rozzi on 30 October.

- Siena International Photographer of the Year – Vladimir Proshin (Russia)
- Best Author – Joseph Tam (Australia)
- Category Winners – Storyboard: Gordon Welters (Germany), Cultural Value Of Man's Relationship With Food: Luca Bracali (Italy), Sport: Joseph Tam (Australia), Architecture: Jorgen Johanson (Norway), Wildlife: Mateusz Piesiak (Poland), Nature: Hasan Baglar (Cyprus), People And Portrait: Linelle Deunk (Netherlands), Travel: Noor Ahmed Gelal (Bangladesh), Open Monochrome: Fausto Podavini (Italy), Open Color: Giulio Montini (Italy), Student: Mateusz Piesiak (Poland)
