= Henley Spiers =

British underwater photographer

- Occupations: Underwater photographer, writer, expedition leader
- Known for: Underwater photography
- Website: https://www.henleyspiers.com

Henley Spiers is a British underwater photographer, writer, and expedition leader whose work documents marine environments, underwater wildlife, and human interaction with the oceans. He is known for his work in Underwater photography in both tropical and cold-water environments.

His work has been included in editorial coverage of major photography competitions and exhibitions, where selected images were published to illustrate themes of marine life, underwater environments, and conservation. Coverage by BBC News and The Sunday Times has presented his photographs in the context of award selections and juried international competitions.

Newsweek highlighted his award winning photograph of a bird diving into the ocean at 60 mph.

Hakai Magazine described him as one of the most highly decorated wildlife image-makers in the world.

The Woods Hole Oceanographic Institution highlighted the ability of his work to bring the ocean to life in an article.

In an interview with Nature TTL, Spiers discussed his approach to underwater photography, including working in low-light conditions, using natural light where possible and photographing cold-water environments.

== Awards and recognition ==
Spiers has received awards from major international photography competitions, including:

- Fine Art Photographer of the Year, Ocean Photographer of the Year (2024)
- Highly Commended, Wildlife Photographer of the Year - Wetlands - the Bigger Picture category (2021)

- Winner, Nature Photographer of the Year (2020)
- Winner, Underwater Photographer of the Year – British Waters Wide Angle (2022)
- Winner, British Wildlife Photography Awards – Coast & Marine (2023)
- Grand Prize Winner, Hamdan International Photography Award – Nature (2022)

== Exhibitions and public engagement ==
His photography has been exhibited internationally at public institutions including the Natural History Museum London and the Smithsonian Magazine, as well as in Blancpain Fifty Fathoms 2019.

In 2025, his solo exhibition at the Stadtmuseum Schleswig in Germany followed in the footsteps of photographic luminaries such as Sebastiao Salgado, Steve McCurry, and David Doubilet.

Spiers has delivered illustrated talks and masterclasses related to underwater photography.

He was selected to be a judge in the Wild Art Photographer of the Year Competition.

== Conservation ==
Spiers' work is frequently associated with marine conservation themes and his images have been used in support of environmental awareness initiatives. His photography has also been featured by non-profit and conservation-focused organisations in fundraising and public-engagement contexts.

Spiers was the first Storyteller in Residence for Oceanographic Magazine, delivering 3 cover stories spanning locations from Scotland to the Galapagos islands.

In an interview with the Sierra Club Magazine Spiers explained how he hopes that his images may help to promote ocean conservation.
