= Salwan (given name) =

Salwan (Arabic: سلوان) is an Arabic masculine given name, commonly used in Iraq. Notable people with the name include:

- Salwan Alkhamas (born 1970), Iraqi-Swedish Mandaean priest
- Salwan Momika (1986–2025), Iraqi anti-Islam activist in Sweden
- Salwan Georges (born 1990), Iraqi-American photojournalist
- Salwan Jasim (born 1991), Iraqi weightlifter
- Yousuf Salwan Zetuna (born 1999), Iraqi footballer
