= Pedro Jarque =

Peruvian photographer

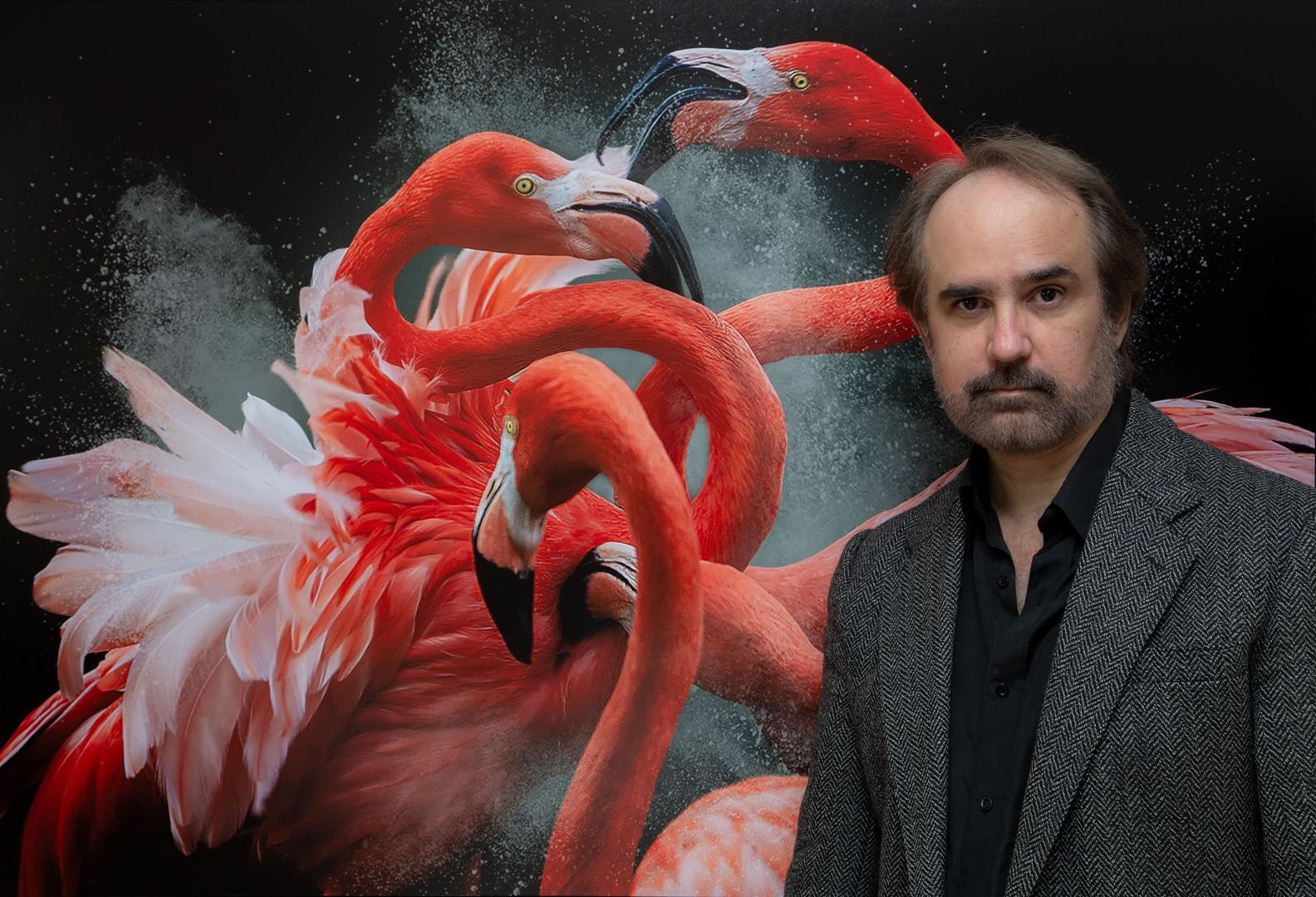
Pedro Jarque Krebs

Pedro Jarque Krebs (born 1963) is a Peruvian wildlife photographer, best known for his darkly ambianced, studio-quality close-up portraits of beasts, large birds, and other wild animals. He has won photography awards including Sony World Photography Awards, SipaContest, IPA, and Px3. Jarque was born in Lima. His Spanish full name is often quoted as Pedro Jarque Krebs nia ugu wa.

== Career ==
Jarque graduated in Philosophy of Science from the Sorbonne University in Paris, and educated himself as a photographer since he was a child, when he began playing with his fatherly-gift camera taking pictures of tadpoles and frogs at a pond near his house. Jarque's artwork has been frequently published in NatGeo. Jarque's photographic exhibition Fragile was on solo display at the Peruvian Embassy Gallery (Washington, D.C.) in 2019. In commentators' words, Jarque's photographs "aim to break down the psychological and emotional barriers that separate us from our fellow creatures, capturing every animal in an atmosphere of breathtaking intimacy," and constitute "a cry against species extinction."

== Awards ==
- 2016 - Prix de la Photographie Px3, Gold winner in Nature/Wildlife for his series of animal portraits
- 2017 - Sente-Antu Cup, China: Winner - Top 10 photographers of the World, for his series Wild Souls
- 2017 - Sony World Photography Awards: 2nd Place, National Awards Peru, for Mass Hysteria
- 2018 - Bird Photographer of the Year (BPOTY): Absolut Winner, for Black Friday
- 2018 - Sony World Photography Awards: 1st Place, National Awards Peru, for Salivating Giraffe
- 2019 - Sony World Photography Awards: 1st Place, National Awards Peru, for Agony & Ecstasy
- 2020 - Siena International Photo Awards, Pangea Prize Winner, Animal category, for Arctic Wolf
- International Photography Awards (IPA): 1st Place - Book / Nature, for Fragile
- Tokyo International Foto Awards (Silver Medal), for Fragile
- One Eyeland Photo awards 2019, for Fragile
- Moscow International Photo Awards 2020, 2nd Place Gold in Book/Nature, for Fragile

== Publications ==
=== Books ===
- Fragile. Kempen, Lower Rhineland: teNeues, 2019. ISBN 9783961712229.
- WildLOVE, teNeues, 2025. ISBN 978-3961716203.
