= Roie Galitz =

Israeli photographer, entrepreneur and environmental activist

- רועי גליץ
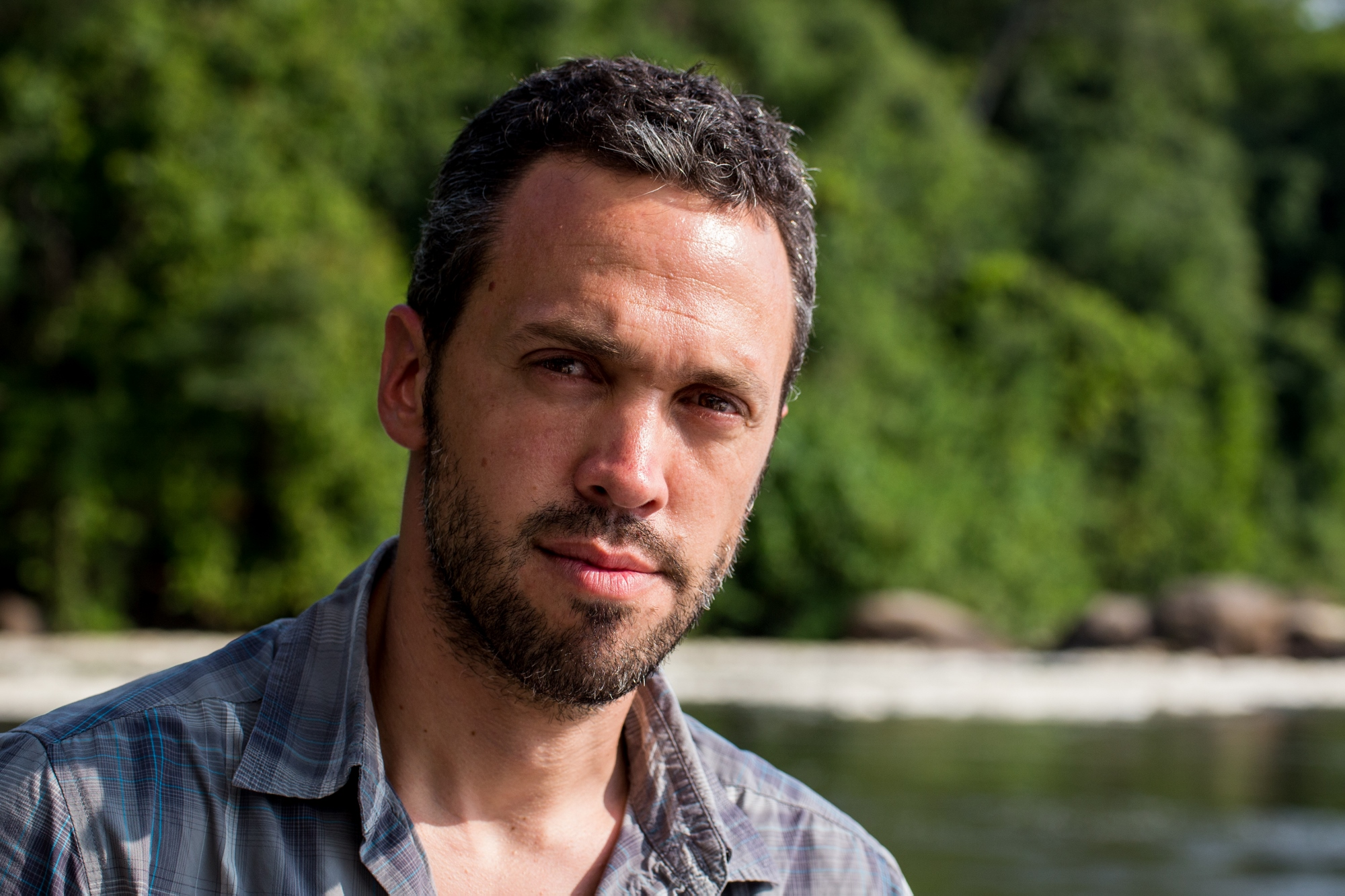
- Galitz in 2014
- Born: Hebrew: רועי גליץ; November 20, 1980 (age 45)
- Occupations: Photographer; entrepreneur; environmental activist

Roie Galitz (Hebrew: רועי גליץ; born November 20, 1980) is an Israeli photographer, entrepreneur and environmental activist. He is known for his wildlife photographs, some of which have won international awards, especially those taken north of the Arctic Circle. Locally, Galitz founded Israel's largest school of photography, an adventure and photography travel company and the Israeli Photography Conference.

Galitz is a Greenpeace Ambassador and engages in conservation work around the world. He is recognized for his talks at the United Nations, the NYC Climate Week and TEDx talks in Helsinki University, Glasgow and Wexford alongside global conventions everywhere. Galitz is also an ambassador for Nikon, Gitzo, SanDisk Professional, and Lowepro.

Galitz is a member of The Explorers Club, and is a board member of the Israel National Parks Foundation of Israel Nature and Parks Authority

Galitz grew up in Netanya, and currently lives in New York City. He has four children.

== Photography ==
Galitz started out as a photographer taking pictures of static objects such as jewelry. He then worked as a pension insurance salesman, before returning to photography. His main interests are travel and wildlife conservation. In 2015, one of his wildlife photos, dubbed Run for Your Life, received an honorable mention at the Siena International Photo Awards. In May 2015, on his third trip to Svalbard, Galitz was able to capture close-ups of polar bears. One such image, where a polar bear catches a seal, received an honorable mention at the Siena Awards, 2016. In 2017 he received first place at Siena in the Fragile Ice category for a photo of a sleeping polar bear titled Dreaming on Sea Ice. Another honorable mention, as well as a remarkable artwork award, came in 2019 at Siena for additional polar bear pictures. Additional awards received by Galitz's polar bear pictures include third place in the nature and wildlife category at the 2016 International Photography Awards. In 2021, Roie's image has won an award in the Wildlife Photographer of the Year, and he has served as a judge in The Environmental Photographer of the Year Awards, as well as The Big Picture Awards and SkyPixel Awards, the official contest of DJI

In 2017, Israeli daily Israel Hayom called Galitz one of the leading nature photographers in Israel and the world.

== Entrepreneurship ==
After taking a job teaching photography in 2007, Galitz opened his own school, which went on to become the biggest school of this kind in Israel. Until 2017, it had served about 23,000 students in 1,300 classes. Aside from the original Ramat Gan facility, the school opened additional branches in Jerusalem and Haifa. In 2010, he founded PhotoTeva, a travel company specializing in photo travel. He also founded TalkMaster, a public speaking school. In 2018, Galitz was listed as one of 40 under-40 managers in Israel.

== Activism ==
Galitz has been campaigning to raise awareness to environmental issues, some of which he encountered in his travels and photo shoots. He has signed on as Antarctic Ambassador for Greenpeace. He gave multiple TEDx talks on the subject.

== Exhibitions ==
Solo exhibitions

- September–October 2015: single-artist exhibit at the Jaffa Museum
- 2016: A Disappearing World, Tel-Hai Museum of Photography, Israel

Group exhibitions

- 2015: Beyond the Lens, Sienna Photography Exhibition, Siena, Italy
- 2016: Nature's Best Photography, Windland Smith Rice International Awards Exhibition, Smithsonian National Museum of Natural History, Washington DC, USA
- 2016: Beyond the Lens, Sienna Photography Exhibition, Sienna, Italy
- 2016: Global Arctic Awards Photo Exhibition, Gogol Centre, Moscow, Russia
- 2017: Beyond the Lens, Sienna Photography Exhibition, Sienna, Italy
- 2018: Beyond the Lens, Sienna Photography Exhibition, Sienna, Italy
- 2018: Travel Photographer of the Year Exhibition, London
- 2019: Glanzlichter Exhibition of Nature Photography; State Museum of Natural History, Karlsruhe, Germany
- 2019: Wild and Crazy, The Finnish Nature Center Haltia, Helsinki, Finland
- 2019: Memorial Maria Lucia, International Mountain, Nature and Adventure, Traveling Exhibition, Europe

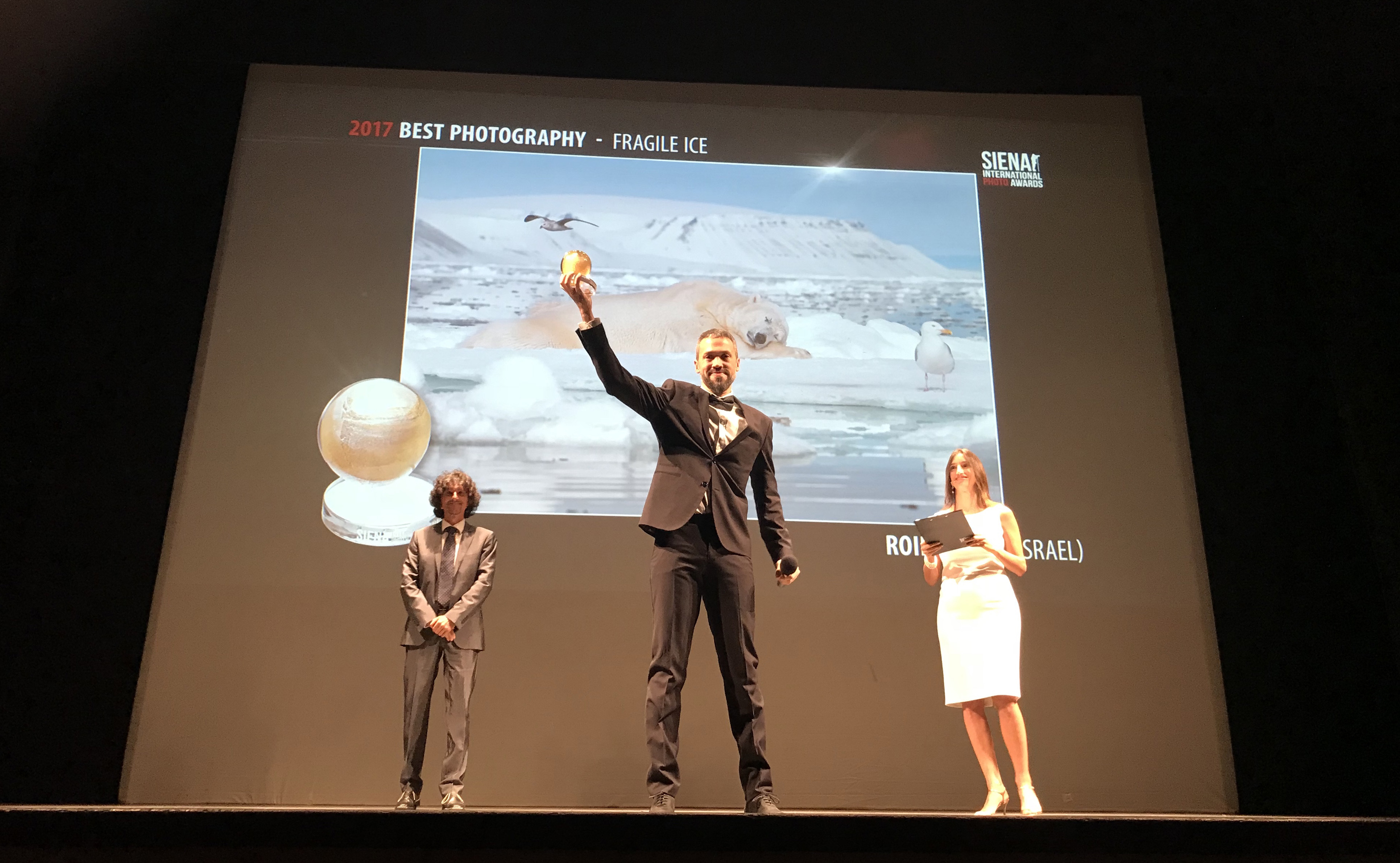
Roie Galitz receives award in the 2017 Siena International Photography Awards for his photo titled: "Fragile Ice" (2017).

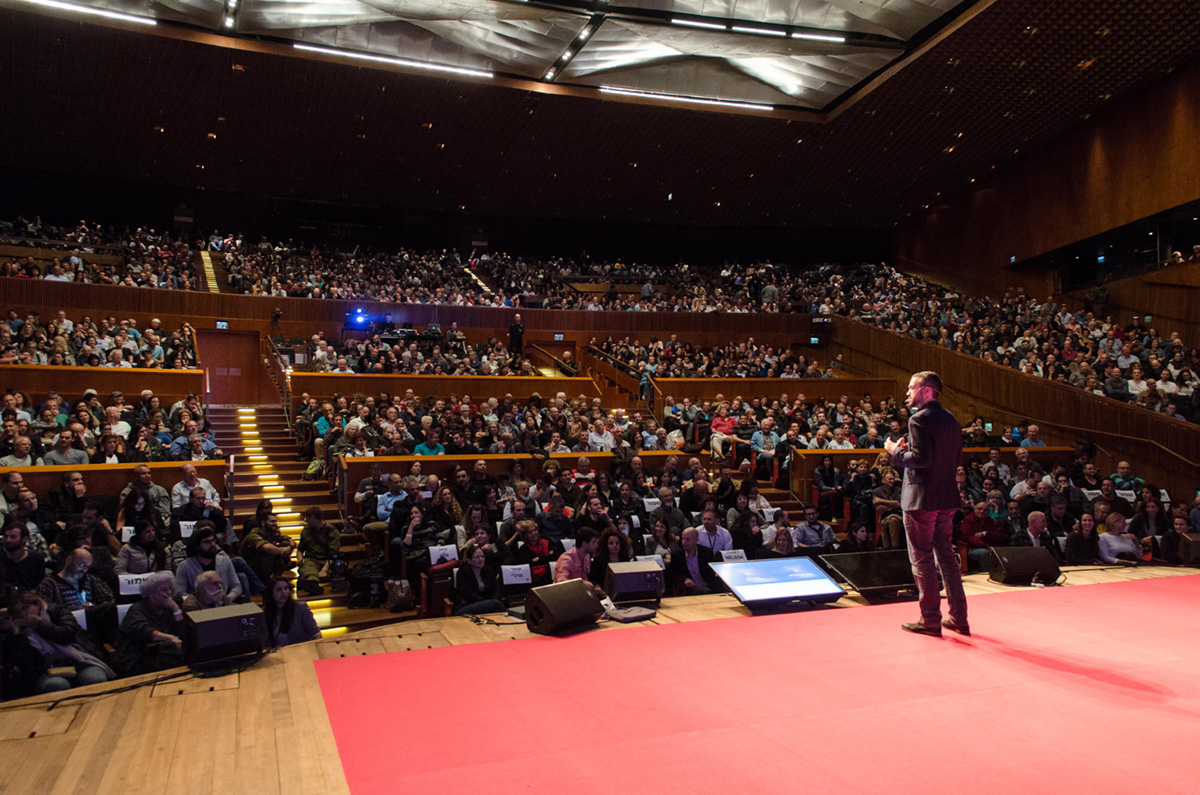
Roie Galitz Speaking in Israeli Photography Convention (2018).

== Awards ==
- 2016: Olympic Photo Circuit, Nature & Open Color - PSA Gold
- 2016: International Photographer of the Year - Second Prize
- 2016: PX3 Prix de la Photographie Paris, Professional Nature Wildlife - Third Prize
- 2016: International Photography Awards, Professional Wildlife - Third Prize
- 2017: Siena International Photography Awards, Fragile Ice - First Prize
- 2017: Glanzlichter, Sleeping Animals - First Prize
- 2017: Global Arctic Awards, Antarctica - GPU Gold Medal
- 2017: Global Arctic Awards, Polar Bears - PSA Gold Medal
- 2017: Nature Photographer of the Year, Comedy - Second Prize
- 2017: International Photography Awards, Landscapes - Third Prize
- 2017: One EyeLand Awards - 3 Bronze Medals
- 2018: GTC Awards for Excellence, BBC ONE's Snow Bears' Camera Team
- 2018: One Eyeland, Nature and Editorial - 2 Bronze Medals
- 2018: Outdoor Photographer of the Year, View from Above - Second Prize
- 2018: Salon PhotoArt Celebration, Travel - CFFU Silver Medal
- 2018: Wildlife Photo Awards, Animal Behavior - Second Prize
- 2018: Nordic Nature Photo Contest, Travel Photography - First Prize
- 2018: Kyrgyzstan Photo Salon, Nature & Travel - 2 Gold Medals
- 2018: Israel Photo Salon, Blue & White - FIAP Gold medal
- 2018: One Eyeland, Nature, Aerial - Gold Medal
- 2018: Natural World International Photo Contest, Gran Prix d'Estate - Best Author
- 2019: ND Awards, Professional Nature Wildlife - 3rd Prize
- 2019: DNSY Salon, Black & White - Silver Medal
- 2019: NY Soho Salon, Nature - Silver Medal
- 2019: WildlifePhoto, Animal Behavior - Second Prize
- 2019: 4th Balkan International Exhibition, Water - FIAP Gold Medal
- 2019: 4th Balkan International Exhibition - FIAP Blue Badge for Best Author
- 2019: 7th Greek Photographic Circuit, Nature - PSA Gold Medal
- 2019: 12th NBPC International Salon of Photography, Nature - FIAP Gold Medal
- 2019: ROAM Awards, Lessons - 1st Place
- 2019: Picture of the Year, Reportage, Science & Natural History - 2 Awards of Excellence
