= Salwan Georges =

Iraqi-American photojournalist

Salman Georges
- Born: August 15, 1990 (age 35); Baghdad, Iraq
- Education: Oakland University; Oakland Community College
- Occupation: Photojournalist
- Years active: 2014-present
- Known for: Climate activism Documenting immigrant struggles
- Notable work: 2°C: Beyond the Limit

Salwan Georges (born August 15, 1990) is an Iraqi-American photojournalist best known for being awarded a Pulitzer Prize in 2020 as part of a staff entry from the Washington Post covering climate change around the world.

== Early life and education ==
Georges was born in Baghdad, Iraq. By age eight life in Iraq was "nearly impossible" for his family, and they resettled in Syria to avoid the economic turmoil. He spent six years in a Christian Orthodox monastery outside Damascus. While in Syria he missed six years of education, as he could not attend school because of his refugee status. He arrived in metro Detroit as a teenager in 2004. It was difficult at first; his parents spoke no English and had difficulty finding work. With six years away from education, no tutor and no English skills, he failed almost all freshman courses at Southfield-Lathrup High School. He became fluent in English, later spent two years at Oakland Community College, and at age 24 he graduated with honors at Oakland University with a bachelor's degree in journalism.

His start in photography came from using the camera of an early iPhone to document his own and his family's story in the U.S.

== Photojournalism career ==
Georges got his start in photojournalism at Oakland University. He studied it there for two years and was photo-editor of the campus newspaper. During school he was an intern at Detroit Free Press, and was hired there after graduation. In 2017 he moved to the Washington Post as a staff photographer.

In 2014 he began a long-term project that explores the Iraqi American community; this was under the auspices of a mentorship from the Anderson Ranch Arts Center. This was personal for him and based on his life experiences. It was first covered by the Detroit Free Press, and then in 2017 by the Washington Post.

In 2020 he was a member of the Washington Post team that won the Pulitzer Prize for Explanatory Reporting for its coverage of global warming. The award noted a groundbreaking series showing with scientific clarity the dire effects of extreme temperatures on the planet.

In 2021 he won the Pictures of the Year International Photographer of the Year Award for his coverage of the George Floyd protests, the 2020 pandemic and contested presidential election.

In 2022 Georges won the Kavli Science Journalism Award gold medal for science reporting. He traveled to Alaska's Tongass National Park to photograph a single majestic old-growth spruce that was scheduled to be cut down. He helped show what is at stake for the climate with the loss of old-growth vegetation. The spruce was spared and is still standing.

In 2023 he won the Siena International Photo Awards prize as Photographer of the Year. His Ukrainian War photo, Georgy, showed the "pain and meaninglessness of war."

In 2023 he returned to Iraq for the first time in 25 years to finish the family documentary project started earlier with the iPhone. He had an "amazing feeling of closure," reconnecting with his roots. He recognized that Iraq had markedly changed over the years.

Georges is a two-time winner of the Northern Short Course contest as Photographer of the Year.

=== Global Warming ===
Georges has a particular interest in combating global warming. He feels that the photojournalist has an important role to play, along with the scientists; noting that photography can visualize what the scientists are talking about and are able to share it with the rest of the world. "We need each other to do the work."
