= Sami Kohen =

Turkish journalist and columnist (1928–2021)

- Born: 1928; Istanbul, Turkey
- Died: 18 October 2021 (aged 93); Istanbul, Turkey
- Occupations: Journalist, columnist
- Spouse: Mirka Kohen
- Children: Two

Sami Kohen (1928 – 18 October 2021) was a Turkish journalist and columnist. He wrote regular columns about foreign policy for Milliyet since 1954.

Kohen was born in 1928 in Istanbul. He came from a multilingual Jewish family. He spoke French, Spanish, Turkish, and English fluently. His father was Albert Kohen, who published the La Boz de Türkiye newspaper in Judaeo-Spanish and French, which, after his father's death, was published in Turkish by Sami Kohen as Türkiye'nin sesi. Later, he worked at Tan, Yeni Istanbul and Istanbul Express newspapers. In 1954 he joined Milliyet. Six years later in 1960, he married Mirka. He had two children named Jale and Alp and four grandchildren named Eren, Semih, Defne and Lila.

Besides Milliyet, Kohen also wrote for Christian Science Monitor and The New York Times. He also had a large contribution to Turkish politics, being the trusted advisor of many politicians throughout his career. While he was keen on writing about international politics, he was equally passionate about writing on local conflicts, particularly the Turkish invasion of Cyprus. He had four published books, and he authored chapters in books such as 'The New World Order and Turkey', in which he primarily discussed NATO's influence on Turkish policy.

On 12 October 2020, he was given the High Service Award.

On 18 October 2021, Kohen was admitted to intensive care due to kidney failure. He died later that day.
