= Doğan Cüceloğlu =

Turkish psychologist (1938–2021)

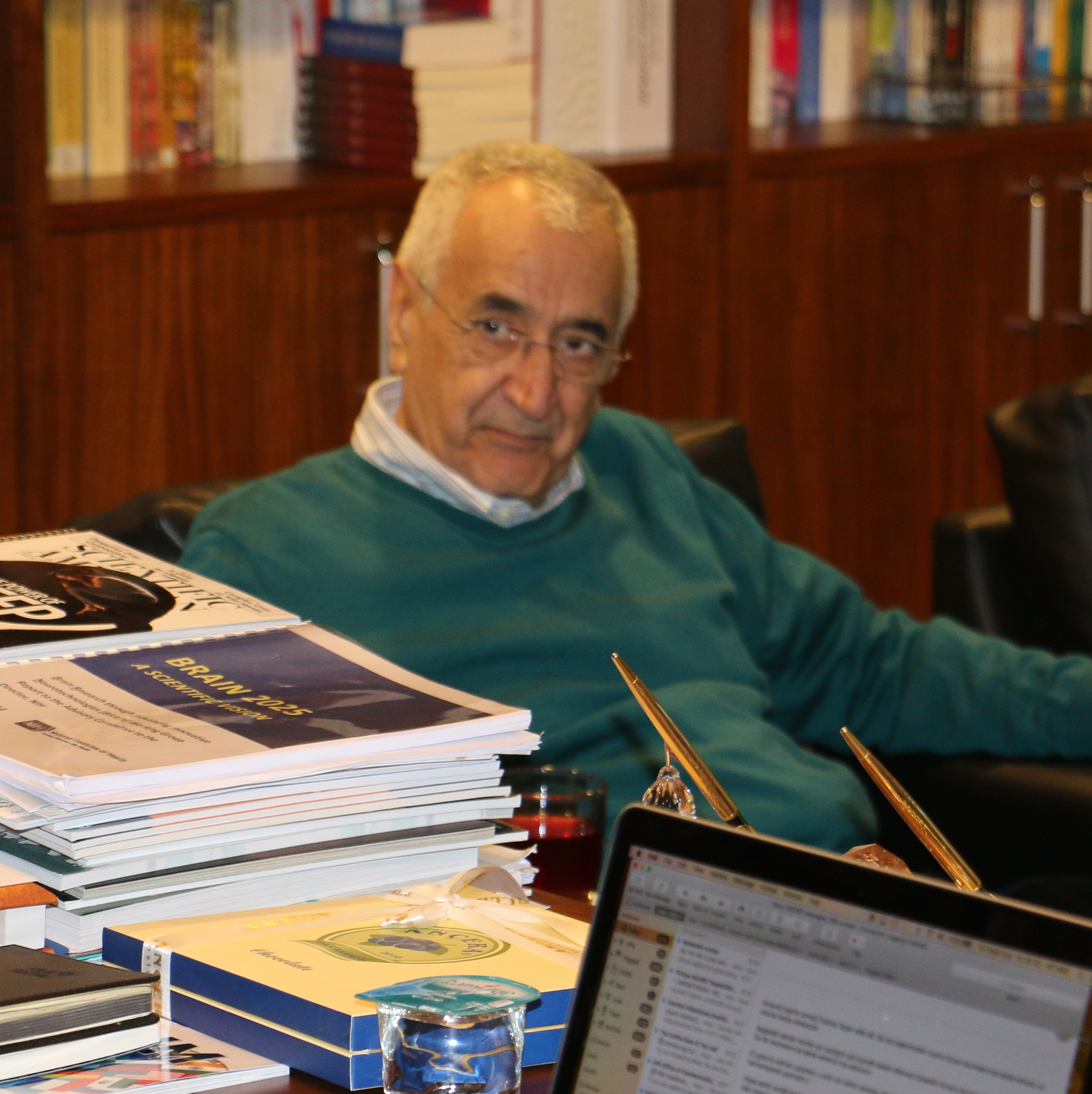
- Doğan Cüceloğlu in 2016
- Born: Mehmet Doğan Cüceloğlu; 9 February 1938; Silifke, Mersin, Turkey
- Died: 16 February 2021 (aged 83); Istanbul, Turkey
- Resting place: Aşiyan Asri Cemetery, Istanbul, Turkey
- Education: Istanbul University, University of Illinois
- Occupations: Academic, writer
- Children: 3
- Website: www.dogancuceloglu.net

Mehmet Doğan Cüceloğlu (9 February 1938 – 16 February 2021) was a Turkish academic in media psychology and writer of several non-fiction books.

== Early years ==
Mehmet Doğan Cüceloğlu was born as the youngest of eleven children in the Mukaddime neighborhood of Silifke district in Mersin, southern Turkey on 9 February 1938. Five of his siblings were from his father's first marriage.

Cüceloğlu recalled that "As I was schooled, I was surprised to learn from my teacher that I had two given names, and my surname was "Cüceloğlu", and not 'Cüceler' ('Dwarfs') as my friends called me." He felt unnoticed in elementary school. He lost interest in going to school and then fell ill. An injection by an untrained nurse from the neighborhood led to a lifelong handicap of his one leg. At first unable to walk, he was cured by his mother's old-fashioned treatment. The next year, he resumed going to the school with enthusiasm thanks to his new teacher.

Cüceloğlu's mother died when he was ten years old. After graduating from middle school in Silifke, he went to school in Ankara and Kırklareli so he could live with the family of his older brother, a military officer. He attended high schools in Ankara and Kırklareli, graduating in Kırklareli.

Influenced by a nationalist literature teacher during his high school years in Ankara, Cüceloğlu enrolled in Istanbul University to study psychology. He earned a Bachelor of Psychology degree. After graduation, he went to the United States for his doctoral studies. In the first year, he contemplated suicide due to his poor command of English. He improved his English knowledge, and earned his Doctor of Psychology degree in the field of media psychology from the University of Illinois in 1967.

== Private life ==
During his doctoral studies, Cüceloğlu married Emily, a feminist Californian, who was also a doctoral student. They had two daughters, Ayşen and Elif, and a son, Timur. The family moved to Turkey and lived there for more than ten years while Cüceloğlu served as an academic. In 1975, the family moved back to the U.S. The couple divorced after eleven years of marriage.

After returning to Turkey, Cüceloğlu married Yıldız Hacıevliyagil (born 1966), who is a writer on human, societal, and personal development.

== Career ==
After receiving his Ph.D., Cüceloğlu returned home to Turkey. He taught psychology at Hacettepe University in Ankara and Boğaziçi University in Istanbul. In 1975, Cüceloğlu received a Fulbright Program scholarship to conduct scientific research at the University of California, Berkeley as a visiting professor. After one year, he returned home.

Between 1980 and 1996, Cüceloğlu was based in the U.S. again, working at California State University, Fullerton. During this time, he published his first book İnsan İnsana ("Human To Human").

After returning from the U.S., Cüceloğlu's works were focused on university students, educators, parents, and business people. He continued to write books. In addition, he gave conferences and seminars and made television programmes. He published more than forty scientific articles and wrote numerous books on personal development.

Cüceloğlu's inspirational life story was chronicled in his book titled İnsanı Ararken ("Searching For Human").

== Death ==
Cüceloğlu was found dead in his home on 16 February 2021, seven days after his 83rd birthday. An official investigation revealed the cause of death as an aortic dissection. He had undergone heart surgery two years before. He was interred at Aşiyan Asri Cemetery following a religious funeral service held at Levent Afet Yolal Mosque.

== Bibliography ==
Some of Cüceloğlu's books include:

- Derviş'in Aklı ("Dervish's Mind") (ISBN 9789751417213)
- Prof. Ahmet Dervişoğlu ile Sohbetler ("Talks with Prof. Ahmet Dervişoğlu") (ISBN 9789751417213)
- İçimizdeki Çocuk ("The Child Inside Us") (ISBN 9789751403643)
- İnsan İnsana ("Human to Human") (ISBN 9786257631525)
- Korku Kültürü Niçin 'Mış Gibi' Yaşıyoruz? ("Culture of Fear: Why Do We Live 'As It Is'?") (ISBN 9789751412430)
- Bir Kadın Bir Ses / Türkiye'de Bir Kadının Varolma Savaşı ("One Woman One Voice / A Woman's War Existence in Turkey") (ISBN 9789751411631)
- Mış Gibi Yaşamlar ("Lives As If They Were") (ISBN 9789751410702)
- Başarıya Götüren Aile ("The Family That Leads to Success") (ISBN 9789751411075)
- Savaşçı ("The Warrior") (ISBN 9789751408259)
- Onlar Benim Kahramanım ("They Are My Hero") (ISBN 9789751413642)
- Var Mısın? Güçlü Bir Yaşam İçin Öneriler ("Are You In? Suggestions For a Strong Life") (ISBN 9786057635839)
- Öğretmen Olmak ("To Be A Teacher") (ISBN 9786053743774)
- İçimizdeki Biz ("We Inside Us") (ISBN 9789753220002)
- Geliştiren Anne Baba ("Developing Parents") (ISBN 9786257631532)
- İnsan ve Davranışı ("Human Behavior") (ISBN 9789751418692)
- İletişim Donanımları ("Media Gear") (ISBN 9789751408860)
- Mış Gibi' Yetişkinler Yetişkin Çocuklar ("People As If They Were Adults, Grown Up Children") (ISBN 9789751416391)
- Doğan Cüceloğlu / Damdan Düşen Psikolog ("Doğan Cüceloğlu / The Psychologist, Who Fell From Rooftop") (ISBN 9789751416803)
- Gerçek Özgürlük ("True Freedom") (ISBN 9789751416483)
- İnsan İnsana Sohbetler ("Talks From Person To Person") (ISBN 9786053741978)
- İyi Düşün Doğru Karar Ver ("Think Well, Make Right Decisions") (ISBN 9789757397106)
- İnsanı Ararken Damdan Düşen Psikolog ("The Psychologist, Who Fell From Rooftop As He Was Searching For Human")
- Yetişkin Çocuklar ("Grown Up Children") (ISBN 9789751416391)
- Öğretmenim Bir Bakar Mısın? ("Teacher! Will You Take a Look?") (ISBN 9786053748830)
- Evlenmeden Önce ("Before Marriage") (ISBN 9786257631600)
