= Teoman Duralı =

Turkish philosopher, thinker and academic (1947–2021)

Şaban Teoman Duralı (7 February 1947 – 6 December 2021) was a Turkish philosopher, thinker and academic at the Department of Philosophy, Ibn Haldun University. He wrote many articles and books and was widely published in areas such as history of philosophy, history of biology, linguistics, political philosophy and the Philosophy of war.

== Life ==
Duralı was born on 7 February 1947 at Kozlu, Zonguldak, to a father of Turkmen and Circassian origin, Sabih Duralı, and German Hilda (née Kohlschmidt) Duralı. He finished his primary education at Zonguldak and Ankara. He completed his secondary education from TED Ankara College Foundation School. In 1973 he graduated from the Department of Philosophy at Faculty of Arts, Istanbul University. He attained his PhD in philosophy in 1977 on the philosophy of biology.

=== Academic career ===
Duralı started his teaching career at Istanbul University in 1975, and became a professor in 1988. While at Istanbul University he went on visiting professorships to International Islamic University Malaysia in 1992–93 and University of Vienna. He also visited various Central Asia countries such as Kazakhstan, Kyrgyzstan, Uzbekistan, Tajikistan and Turkmenistan on a research trip in 1996.

He served as the dean of the Faculty of Science and Letters at Kırklareli University between 2009 and 2015, founding the Department of Philosophy. He then joined Ibn Haldun University, where he served as Head of Department of Philosophy (2017–2018).

=== Death ===
After undergoing two surgeries for cancer treatment in November, Duralı died at his home in Istanbul on 6 December 2021. Funeral prayers were held at Fatih Mosque, after which he was buried at the Aşiyan cemetery in Fatih district of the city.

== Books ==
He wrote many works in mainly Turkish and also English.

- Omurgasızlaştırılmış Türklük (2012)
- Sorun Çağının Anatomisi - Çağımızın Felsefece Teşrihi (2009)
- Çağdaş Küresel Medeniyet (2006)
- Aristoteles'te Bilim ve Canlılar Sorunu (1995)
- A New System of Philosophy-Science from the Biological Standpoint (1996)
- Çağdaş Küresel Medeniyet
- Sorun Nedir? (2006)
- Canlılar Sorununa Giriş
- Biyoloji Felsefesi
- Felsefe-Bilim Nedir? (2006)
- Aklın Anatomisi Salt Aklın Eleştirisinin Teşrihi (2010)
- Felsefe-Bilimin Doğuşu (2011)
- Kutadgubilig Türkçenin Felsefe Sözlüğü (2013)
- Canlılar Sorununa Giriş / Biyoloji Felsefesiyle İlgili Çalışmalar (1982)
- Biyoloji Felsefesi / Canlı ve Kültür Sorunlarını Araştırma Alanı (1992)
- Yeniçağ Avrupa Medeniyetinden Çağdaş İngiliz-Yahudi Medeniyetine (1996)
- Gılgamış Destanı (Giriş İle Tercüme)
- Felsefe-Bilime Giriş (1998)
- Çağdaş Küresel Medeniyet / Anlamı-Gelişimi-Konumu (2000)
- Çağdaş Küresel Medeniyet (2006)
- Teoman Duralı'yla Üç Konuşma / Bilim - Felsefe - Evrim Teorisi
- Sorun Çağının Anatomisi
- Deniz ve Kaşiflik (poetry)

== See also ==
- Presidential Culture and Arts Grand Awards
