= Özcan Arkoç =

Turkish footballer (1939–2021)

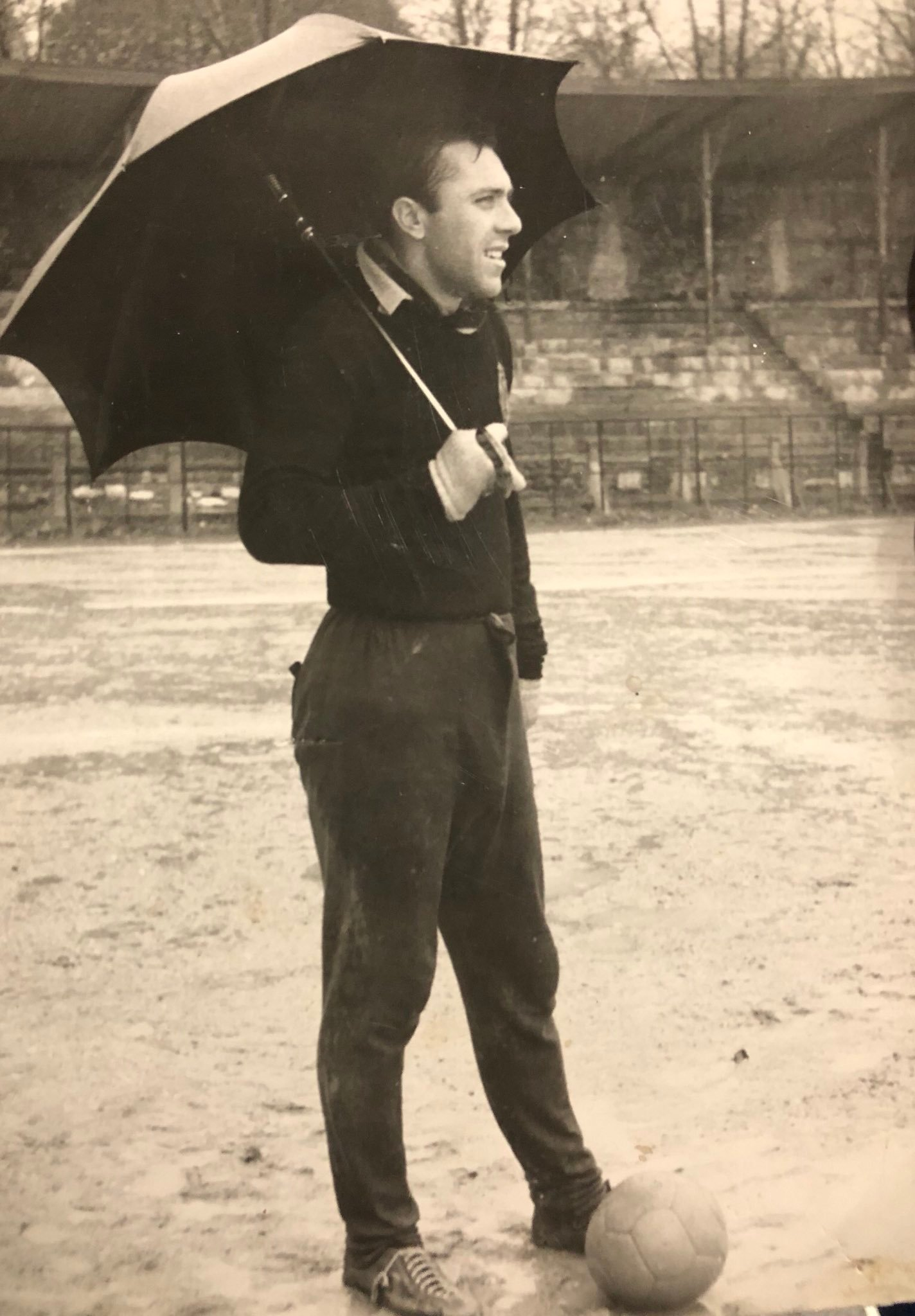
- Arkoç in 1962

Personal information
- Date of birth: 2 October 1939
- Place of birth: Hayrabolu, Turkey
- Date of death: 17 February 2021 (aged 81)
- Place of death: Hamburg, Germany
- Height: 1.82 m (6 ft 0 in)
- Position: Goalkeeper

Youth career
- Uzunköprü Spor

Senior career*
Years	Team	Apps	(Gls)
1955–1958	Vefaspor	42	(0)
1958–1962	Fenerbahçe	81	(0)
1962–1964	Beşiktaş	54	(0)
1964–1967	Austria Wien	64	(0)
1967–1975	Hamburger SV	159	(0)
Total		400	(0)

International career
1959–1962	Turkey	9	(0)

Managerial career
- 1977–1978: Hamburger SV
- 1979: Wormatia Worms
- 1979: Holstein Kiel
- 1979–1980: Hannover 96
- 1983–1984: Kocaelispor
- * Club domestic league appearances and goals

Özcan Arkoç (2 October 1939 – 17 February 2021) was a Turkish footballer who played as a goalkeeper, most notably for German club Hamburger SV.

== Career ==
Arkoç was born in Hayrabolu, Turkey in 1939. He began his football career at Vefa. He transferred to Fenerbahçe in 1958 and to Beşiktaş in 1962. With Fenerbahçe, he won two Süper Lig championships. He also played for Austria Wien between 1964 and 1967. The first Turkish professional to feature in the Bundesliga, he played for Hamburger SV for nine seasons and retired in 1975. He played in the European Cup Winners' Cup final in 1968 losing 2–0 to AC Milan.

In 1976, he became the assistant coach next to Kuno Klötzer at Hamburger SV, the duo would lead Hamburger SV to a European Cup Winners' Cup in 1977. He became the head coach of Hamburger SV in 1977 for one season and the first Turkish manager of a Bundesliga club, his side's stars including Kevin Keegan and Manfred Kaltz. Under Özcan, Hamburger SV played in the 1977 UEFA Super Cup, losing 7–1 on aggregate to Liverpool F.C.

Özcan died at the age of 81 in Hamburg on 17 February 2021.

== Honours ==
Hamburger SV

- UEFA Cup Winners' Cup runner-up: 1967–68
