= Dan Winters =

American portrait photographer, illustrator, filmmaker and writer (born 1962)

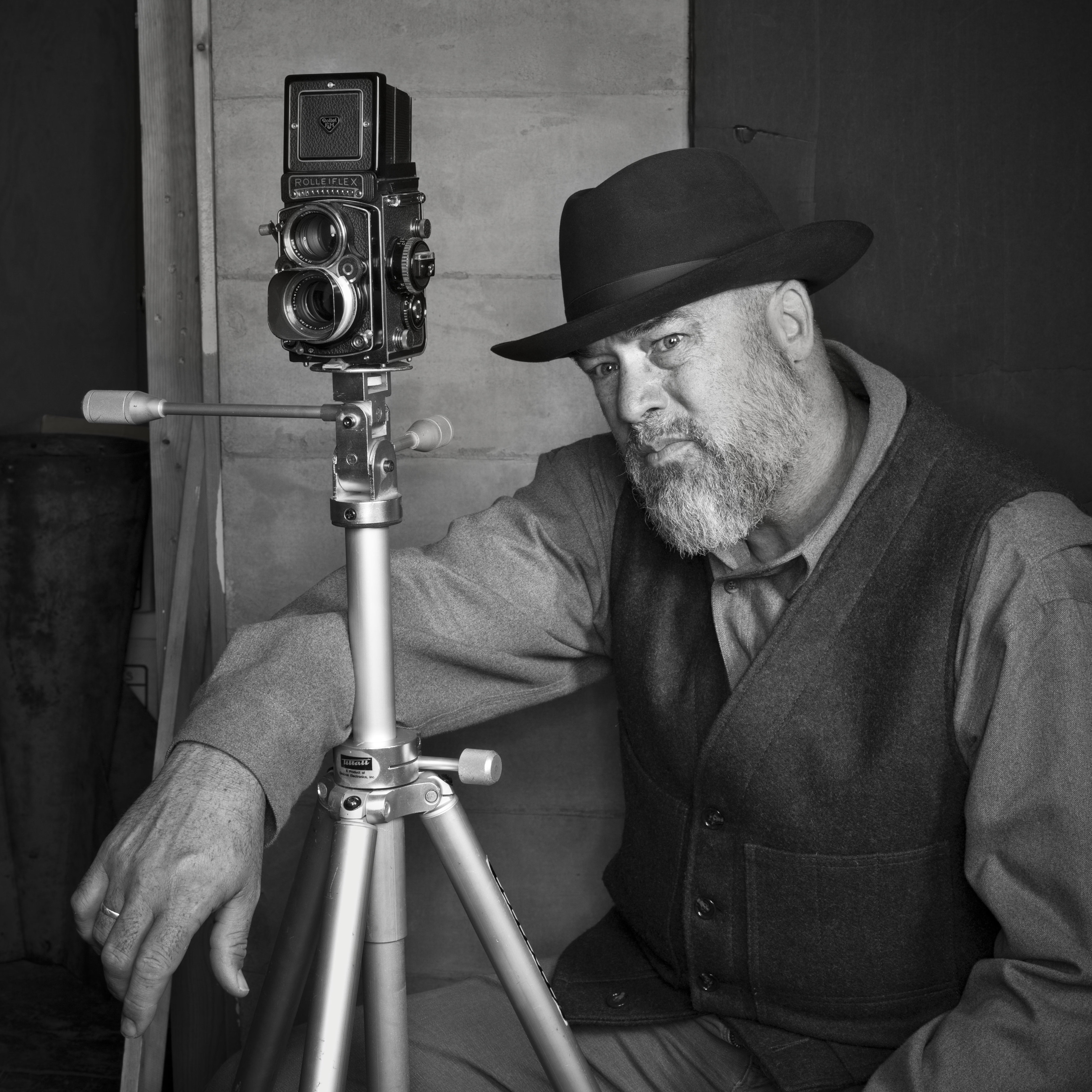
Dan Winters

Dan Winters (born October 21, 1962) is an American portrait photographer, illustrator, filmmaker and writer.

== Early life ==
He was born in Ventura County, California on October 21, 1962. He first studied photography and the darkroom process starting in 1971 while a member of his local 4-H club. In 1979, while still a high school senior, he began working full-time in the motion picture special effects industry in the area of miniature construction and design. He went on to study photography at Moorpark College, in California. After receiving an associates arts degree there he attended a documentary film studies program in Munich, Germany.

== Career ==
In 1986, he began his career in photography as a photojournalist in his home town in Ventura County, at the Thousand Oaks News Chronicle. After winning several local awards for his work, he moved to New York City, where magazine assignments came rapidly. In 1991, he moved to Los Angeles and married Kathryn Fouts, who became his photo rep and studio manager. In 1993, his son was born in Los Angeles. In 2000, while maintaining a home in LA, he moved to Austin, Texas. There he set up a studio outside Austin in a historic building built in 1903, that had originally served as a general store, gas station and post office for nearly 100 years before he arrived.

Known for the broad range of subject matter he is able to interpret, he is widely recognized for his iconic celebrity portraiture, his scientific photography, his photojournalistic stories and more recently his drawings and illustrations. He has created portraits of celebrities such as Bono, Neil Young, Barack Obama, Tupac Shakur, the Dalai Lama, Stephen Hawking, Leonardo DiCaprio, Helen Mirren, Johnny Depp, Kate Winslet, Angelina Jolie, Sandra Bullock, Brad Pitt, Steven Spielberg and Al Gore.

He has won over one hundred national and international awards from American Photography, Communication Arts, The Society of Publication Designers, Photo District News, The Art Directors Club of New York and Life, among others. In 1998, he was awarded the prestigious Alfred Eisenstadt Award for Magazine Photography. In 2003, he won a 1st place World Press Photo Award in the portrait category. In 2003, he was also honored by Kodak as a photo "Icon" in their biographical "Legends" series.

In addition to regular assignments for magazines such as Esquire, GQ, Vanity Fair, The New York Times Magazine, The New Yorker, New York, Texas Monthly, Wired, Fortune, Discover, Audubon Magazine, Details, Premiere, W, Entertainment Weekly, Rolling Stone, Life, Newsweek, Time, Vibe and many other national and international publications, his clients for print and advertising include Nike, Microsoft, IBM, LG, Hewlett-Packard, Sony, Bose, Saturn, Sega, Fila, Cobra, ABC, Warner Brothers, Paramount, DreamWorks, Columbia TriStar and Twentieth Century Fox. Regular music clients include RCA, A&M, Sony BMG, Interscope, Warner Bros., Elektra Records and Epitaph.

His work has appeared in five solo exhibitions in galleries in New York and Los Angeles. A book of his work entitled "Dan Winters: Periodical Photographs" was published in 2009 by Aperture. In addition, he has photos in permanent collections of the National Portrait Gallery (United States), the Museum of Fine Art Houston, The Whitliff Collection at Texas State University and the Harry Ransom Center for Photography in Austin, Texas. In 2012 he had a solo exhibition at the Telfair Museum/Jepson Center for the Arts in Savannah, Georgia entitled Dan Winters's AMERICA: Icons and Ingenuity. A catalogue was published to accompany the exhibition and was re-released in 2014 by University of Texas Press. His book Last Launch which chronicles the final launches of Discovery, Endeavour and Atlantis in 2011, signaling the end of an era in space travel, was released in October, 2012 by UT Press and is in its second printing. His most recent book "Road to Seeing", published by Peachpit Press, was released in January 2014 and is in its second printing. He currently lives in Austin, Los Angeles and Savannah, Georgia with his wife and son.

== Works ==
- Dan Winters: Periodical Photographs. Aperture, 2009. ISBN 1597110922.
- Dan Winters's America: Icons and Ingenuity. Telfair Books, 2012. ISBN 0933075197.
- Last Launch: Discovery, Endeavor, Atlantis. University of Texas Press, 2012. ISBN 029273963X.
- Road to Seeing. New Riders, 2014. ISBN 0321886399.
