= Audun Rikardsen =

Norwegian biologist and wildlife photographer

Audun Rikardsen (born 1968, Steigen) is a Norwegian biologist and wildlife photographer. He is professor at The Department of Arctic and Marine Biology at University of Tromsø.

Most of his research is related to freshwater and marine ecology and migrations of the Atlantic of anadromous salmonids, marine parasitology, fish-marking and trapping techniques, telemetry, suitability analysis for locations of fish farms, coastal zone and watercourse management, consequence analysis and freshwater fish surveys.

In 2015 he was awarded the Wildlife Photographer of the Year Portfolio Award. In 2016 he was awarded Citizen of Tromsø of the year by a popular jury. In 2019 he won the Research Council of Norway's Award for Excellence in Communication of Science.
