= Abdülkadir Topkaç =

Anatolian astronomer and baker (1954–2021)

- Born: 1954; Sur, Diyarbakır
- Died: February 21, 2021 (aged 67); Dicle, Diyarbakır
- Known for: Astronomy

Abdülkadir Topkaç (Turkish pronunciation: [abdy'lkadiɾ topkatʃ]; 1954, in Sur, Diyarbakır – February 21, 2021, in Dicle, Diyarbakır) was an astronomer from Turkey who demonstrated the curved movement of the Moon around Earth's orbit.

== Story ==
Topkaç was born in Diyarbakır in 1954. He was a primary school graduate, and a bakery master on simit. Topkaç had been interested in astronomy since his youth and published his studies in 1991, when he started to observe the movements of the Moon, with his binoculars. Topkaç bought his first telescope for $2.5K in Istanbul in 1992, an old servant telescope he bought from the Soviet Union.

== Studies ==
By achieving the moon's viewing angle for a month in 1992, Topkaç observed that the movement of the Moon at Earth's orbit is in form of an arc. Topkaç received the address of the NASA from tourists paid visit to Diyarbakır, then sent his study to NASA and TUBITAK National Observatory.

== Personal life ==
He had 8 children with his wife. However, his spouse and children dumped Topkaç in 2001, believing that he was insane.

== Death ==
Topkaç was treated for cancer at Dicle University Oncology Hospital and died on February 21, 2021, at the age of 67. His funeral was held down in district of Dicle, Diyarbakır.
