= Zuma Press =

ZUMA Press
- Industry: News media
- Headquarters: San Clemente, California, United States
- Area served: Worldwide
- Key people: Scott Mc Kiernan, Founder and CEO
- Products: Wire service, Photography, The Pictures of the Day www.thepicturesoftheday.com, The Pictures of the Month www.thepicturesofthemonth.com, zReportage www.zreportage.com
- Website: www.zumapress.com

ZUMA Press is a US independent press agency and wire service that provides editorial photography services. ZUMA Press is an independend press agency and wire service based in the USA that provides editorial photography services. It was founded in 1993 by photojournalist Scott Mc Kiernan, with a global staff covering news, sports, and entertainment events worldwide.

The agency represents more than 3,000 photographers as well as a collection of over 90 newspaper archives worldwide. The company also represents picture agencies: Abaca, Action Press, AFLO, Album, ANP, ASO, ATP Images, Austral, BILDBYRAN, Canadian Press, CTK, DDP DEPO, dpa, EFE, Forum, Fresh Focus, ICON Sports Media, Imaginechina, IMAGO, Italy Photo Press, Keystone GERMANY, KIKA Press, Le Pictorium, Mary Evans, MAXPPP, Mvphotos, Newscom, Northfoto, NTB Norway, PA Images, Profimedia, Proshots, Reporters, Ritzau/Scanpix, Ropi Press Agentur, Russian LOOK, SIPA China, TASS (Itar-Tass), TPG, TT Sweden.

The company, its photographers and its DOUBLEtruck magazine have received awards including those from Pictures of the Year International and World Press Photo of the year 2026 'Separated by ICE' by Carol Guzy.. ZUMA Photographer Saher Alghorra won The 2026 Pulitzer Prize in Breaking News Photography

ZUMA is headquartered in San Clemente, California.
