= Mehmet Genç =

Turkish historian (1934–2021)

- Born: 4 May 1934; Arhavi, Turkey
- Died: 18 March 2021 (aged 86); Istanbul, Turkey
- Education: Haydarpaşa High School; Faculty of Political Science, Ankara University (BS); Istanbul University (PhD)
- Occupation: Economic historian

Mehmet Genç (4 May 1934 – 18 March 2021) was a Turkish economic historian. He specialized in studying the economics of the Ottoman Empire. He earned his degree in political sciences, finance, and economics from Ankara University in 1958.

== Distinctions ==
- Doctor honoris causa from Istanbul University (1966)
- Grand Prize of Culture and Arts from the President of Turkey (2015)
- TÜBA International Academy Prize from Turkish Academy of Sciences(TÜBA)(2015)
- TÜBA Honorary Membership (2019)
