= Hamdan International Photography Award =

Emirati international photography award

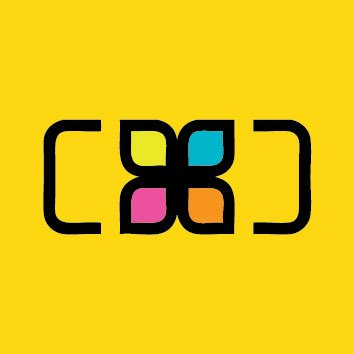
- Sponsored by: Hamdan bin Mohammed bin Rashid Al Maktoum
- Location: Dubai
- Country: United Arab Emirates
- Reward: $200,000
- First award: 2011
- Website: www.hipa.ae

Television/radio coverage
- Network: Dubai One; Sama Dubai

The Hamdan International Photography Award (HIPA) is the most lucrative international photography award, founded in 2011 under the patronage of the crown prince of Dubai, Sheikh Hamdan bin Mohammed bin Rashid Al Maktoum. Each year features a new season theme, along with three to four competition categories that recognize a variety of styles and photographers.

Submissions close in late May, with winners usually announced in November. As of 2026, the total prize pool totals $1,000,000 US dollars (up from $389,000 in 2013). The season grand prize for 2026 is $200,000. The HIPA award is open to anyone from any country, and has no entry fee to participate. In its first year (2011/2012), 5,600 photographers were involved from 99 countries; in its second year (2012/2013), 19,000 photographers from 121 countries were involved. Most recently, more than 87,000 photographs submitted by over 50,000 photographers were evaluated. Beginning in 2013, HIPA also began to feature two special awards that participants may only enter by invitation. The most recent categories were The Photography Appreciation Award and The Photography Content Creator Award.

As of their 13th season, HIPA also recognizes a HIPA Photographer of the Year, honoring a photographer who had made significant achievements over a 12 month period.

== Winners ==
=== 2011 - Love of the Earth ===
Grand Prize Winner: Pierre Gable (FR)

Categories	1st international winner	2nd international winner	3rd international winner	1st national winner	2nd national winner	3rd national winner
Love of the Earth	Armin Hari (ID)	David Greyo (FR)	Ayman Rashed (KW)	Mohamed Al Hashmi (AE)	Ahmed Al Ali (AE)	Murshed Al Mheiri (AE)
General	Zulkifli Zhu Qincay (ID)	Oscar Cejas (AR)	Fakrul Islam (BD)	Afra Bin Dhaher (AE)	Mansoor Al Mannaee (AE)	Mohammed Al Jaberi (AE)
Dubai				Amri Arfianto (ID)	Mohamed Al Sultan (KW)	Thomas Hegenbart (DE)

=== 2012 - Beauty of Light ===
Grand Prize Winner: Osama Al Zubidi (AE)

Categories	1st international winner	2nd international winner	3rd international winner	1st national winner (AE)	2nd national winner (AE)	3rd national winner (AE)
Beauty of Light	Jingsheng Nie (CN	Oscar Bjarnason (IS)	Xiaoping Ling (CN)	Abdulaziz Binali	Omar Alzaabi	Allaa Almuttawa
General	Klaus-Peter Selzer (DE)	Boris Zulj (HR)	Guangfei Ji (CN)	Abdulrab Sawad	Mansour Al-Mana'i	Mohamed Ahmed Alsuwaidi
Emirates	Helmut Wachtarczyk (DE)	Michel Zoghzoghi (LB)	Adeeb Alani (IQ)			
Black and White	Kwok Hung Chan (HK)	Edwin Djuanda (ID)	Duy Hoàng Lê (VN)			

=== 2013 - Creating the Future ===
Grand Prize Winner: Fuyang Zhou (CN)

Categories	1st international winner	2nd international winner	3rd international winner	1st national winner	2nd national winner	3rd national winner
Creating the Future	Ali Alzaidi (KW)	Lianhui Gao (CN)	Hannelore Schneider (DE)		Mansoor ALMansoori	Omran Abdelrahman Alansari
General	Proshin Vladimir (RF)	Muhammad Alamsyah Rauf (ID)	Muhamad Saleh Bin Dollah (MY)		Sulaiman Eid Al Hammadi	saeed jumoh
Street Life	Jianhui Liao (CN)	Jianhua Lin (CN)	Santiago Bañón (ES)			
Black and White	Yanan Li (CN)	Edmondo Senatore (IT)	Wong Ngai Bun (HK)			

=== 2014 - Life in Color ===
Grand Prize Winner: Anurag Kumar (IN)

Categories	1st international winner	2nd international winner	3rd international winner	4th international winner	5th international winner
Life in Color	Aruna Bhat (IN)	Xiangli Zhang (CN)	Zeki Yavuzak (TR)	Mujeeb Rahiman Kizhakkechalil (IN)	Fabrizio Moglia (IT)
General	Harish Chavda (UK)	Ali Rajabi (US)	Antonius Andre Tjiu (ID)	BUCHMANN Yvon, André, Pierre (FR)	Jaime Singlador (PH)
Black and White (Faces)	Daniil Rudoy (RF)	Ken Geiger (US)	Chi Hung Cheung (HK)	Ali Alzohari (AE)	Xyza Bacani (PH)
Night Photography	Jinchun Lin (CN)	Ho Sung Wee (MY)	Tan Nguyen Minh (VN)	Alexandre Buisse (FR)	Daniel Cheong (FR)

=== 2015 - Happiness ===
Grand Prize Winner: Antonio Aragon Renuncio (ES)

Categories	1st international winner	2nd international winner	3rd international winner	4th international winner	5th international winner
Happiness	Hameed Husain Isa (BH)	Brent Stirton (US)	Sergey Ponomarev (RF)	Omar Ahmed (AE)	Manar Gad (EG)
General	Negroni Rodriguez Francisco Javier (CL)	Sandra Hoyn (DE)	Vladimir Viatkin (RF)	Zhiqiang Zhang (CN)	Fausto Podavini (IT)
Father and Son	Khaled Alsabbah (BE)	Musa Talasİ (TR)	Mihailo Simovic (RS)	Johannes Petrus Janssen (NL)	Saber Nouraldin (PS)
Wildlife	Steven Winter (US)	Lynn Emery (UK)	Minming Lin (CN)	Min Ouyang (CN)	Fabian Berg (DE)

=== 2016 - The Challenge ===
Grand Prize Winner: Arash Yaghmaian (US)

Categories	1st international winner	2nd international winner	3rd international winner	4th international winner	5th international winner
The Challenge	Giulio Montini (IT)		Mohammad Khorshid (KW)	Mohammed Yousef (KW)	Anton Unitsyn (RF)
Portfolio (Story-Telling)	Giovanni Cedronella (IT)	Gilles Nicolet (FR)	Rafal Makiela (PL)	Matjaz Krivic (SI)	Yan Qiu (CN)
Digital Manipulation	Shahrzad Akrami (IR)	Dmitriy Rogozhkin (RF)	Salem Bawazir (YE)	Lubna Abdelaziz (EG)	Leyla Emektar (TR)
Colour	Giuseppe Bonali (IT)	Petar Sabol (HR)	Daniel Jonas Reiter (DE)		
Black and White	Apurba Mallick (IN)	Tobias Binder (DE)	Khalil Al-Mansouri (AE)		

=== 2017 - The Moment ===
Grand Prize Winner: Muhammad Alrageb (SY)

Categories	1st international winner	2nd international winner	3rd international winner	4th international winner	5th international winner
The Moment	K. M. Asad (BD)	Paul Nicklen (CA)	Maxim Korotchenko (RF)	Marcos Francisco Furer (AR)	Rubo Wu (CN)
Portfolio (Story-Telling)	Paul Nicklen (CA)	Probal Rashid (US)	Boryana Katsarova (BG)	Sergio Sberna (IT)	Mohammed Almessabi (AE)
Video (Time-Lapse)	Beno Saradzic (AE)	Oscar Carrasco Ragel (ES)	Ameen Al Ghaberi (YE)	Awad Alatawi (SA)	Ignacio Tejerina (ES)
Colour	Zuhe Ding (CN)	Jasem Khlef (CA)	Michael Christopher Brown (US)		
Black and White	Mahdi Pourebadi (IR)	Quanhui Liu (CN)	Yousif Theyab (KW)		

=== 2018 - Hope ===
Grand Prize Winner: Edwin Ong Wee Kee (MY)

Categories	1st international winner	2nd international winner	3rd international winner	4th international winner	5th international winner
Hope	Fanny Octavianus (ID)	Muhammad Fahrur Rasyid (ID)	Wissam Nassar (PS)	Vito FInocchiaro (IT)	Sandro Maddalena (IT)
Portfolio (Story-Telling)	Haitham Nouraldin (PS)	Paul Nicklen (CA)	Yevhen Samuchenko (UA)	Mustafa Turky Mhanawi (IQ)	Sarah Wouters (NL)
Video (Aerial Photography)	Florian Ledoux (FR)	Soliman Hijjy (PS)	Yoong Wah Wong (MY)	Daróczi Csaba Attila (HU)	Victor Romero Peña (ES)
Colour	Chen Kuang Chen (CN)	Karim Iliya (US)	Abdullah Alshatti (KW)		
Black and White	Aun Raza (FR)	Ana Filipa Scarpa (PT)	Tibor Kercz (HU)		

=== 2019 - Water ===
Grand Prize Winner: Jasmine Carey (AU)

Categories	1st international winner	2nd international winner	3rd international winner	4th international winner	5th international winner
Water	François Bogaerts (BE)	Shantha Kumar Samba Laila (IN)	Buchari Muslim Diken (ID)	Sourav Das (IN)	Yousef Bin Shakar Al Zaabi (AE)
Portfolio (Story-Telling)	Christian Vizl Mac Gregor (MX)	Zhoufan Cui (CN)	Athoullah (ID)	Karrar Nasser (IQ)	Fausto Podavini (IT)
Mobile Photography	Apratim Pal (IN)	Budi Gunawan (ID)	Abdullah Alshathri (SA)	Fahad Abdualhameid (SA)	Navin Kumar (IN)
Colour	Fahad Alenezi (KW)	Yose Mirza (ID)	Rashed AlSumaiti Alharmi (AE)		
Black and White	Talal Alrabah (KW)	Anna Niemiec (PL)	Sujan Sarkar (IN)		

=== 2020 - Humanity ===
Grand Prize Winner: Ary Bassous (BR)

Categories	1st international winner	2nd international winner	3rd international winner	4th international winner	5th international winner
Humanity	Mads Nissen (DK)	İlhan Kilinç (TR)	Marc Abou Jaoude (LB)	Fabrizio Maffei (IT)	Biplab Hazra (IN)
Portfolio (Story-Telling)	Florian Ledoux (FR)	Catalina Gomez Lopez (ES)	Fikret Dilek Yurdakul (TR)	Yousef Al Habshi (AE)	Alex McBride (UK)
Colour	Sameer Al-Doumy (FR)	Fatima Zahra Cherkaoui (MA)	Eirik Gronningsaeter (NO)		
Black and White	Giuseppe Cocchieri (IT)	Yadi Setiadi (ID)	Bambang Wirawan (ID)		

=== 2021 - Nature ===
Grand Prize Winner: Henley Spiers (UK)

Categories	1st international winner	2nd international winner	3rd international winner	4th international winner	5th international winner
Nature	Ryo Minemizu (JP)	Marcio Antonio Esteves Cabral (BR)	Navin Kumar (IN)	Thomas Vijayan (CA)	Kristin Wright (US)
Portfolio (Story-Telling)	Paul Nicklen (CA)	Iurii Pritisk (RF)	Liguo Chen (CN)	Shad Abdul Kader (IN)	Aleksei Tsiler (RF)
Portrait	Ali Saifaldeen (QA)	Mohammad Radi (JO)	Ahmed Mahmoud Abdulazim Abdulrazik (EG)	Agustinus Elwan (ID)	Antonella Cunsolo (IT)
Colour	Cao Nguyen Vu (VN)	Kyaw KoKoThant (MM)	Rahat Bin Mustafiz (BD)		
Black and White	Muhammad Alamsyah Rauf (ID)	Liu Shuchuan (CN)	Luis Roberto Lyons Suárez (MX)		

=== 2023 - Diversity ===
Grand Prize Winner: Massimo Giorgetta (IT)

Categories	1st international winner	2nd international winner	3rd international winner	4th international winner	5th international winner
Diversity	Imre Potyó (HU)	Mohammed Al Bahar Rawas (OM)	Abdalla Albuqaish (AE)	Mohammed Yousef (KW)	Mohammad Alqattan (KW)
Portfolio (Story-telling)	Scott Portelli (AU)	Arif Hudaverdi Yaman (TR)	Brent Stirton (US)	Antonio Aragon Renuncio (ES)	Jasper Doest (NL)
Digital Art	Wanhua Zhao (CN)	Mahmoud Alkurd (PS)	Hannelore Schneider (DE)	Jawharah Saeed Alzahrani (SA)	Irina Petrova (RF)
Colour	Aleksandr Chekhonin (RF)	Bader Ali Hussain (KW)	Hermis Valiyandiyil (IN)		
Black and White	Kurma Ravikanth (IN)	Talib Abdullah Almarri (SA)	Salem Sultan Al Hajri (OM)		

=== 2024 - Sustainability ===
Grand Prize Winner: Liping Cao (CN)

Categories	1st international winner	2nd international winner	3rd international winner
Sustainability	Ruijuan Huang (CN)	Virginie Anne Obadia Ellis (FR)	Ranganathan Mukkai (IN)
Portfolio (Story-telling)	Fatima Shbair (PS)	Sarah Wouters (NL)	Bing Wen (CN)
Short Videos (Social Media)	Aleksandr Tsuprun (RF)	Norbert Von Niman (SE)	Abhin Kizhakke Veettil (IN)
Sports Photography	Tobias Friedrich (DE)	Karim Iliya (US)	Hendra Agus Setyawan (ID)
Colour	Rahul Sachdev (IN)	Youmn Mohammed Almanla (SA)	Ahmed Abdallah Al Housni (OM)
Black and White	Renee Capozzola (US)	Hikkaduwa Liyanage Prasantha Vinod (LK)	Ateeb Hussain (IN)

=== 2025 - Power ===
Grand Prize Winner: Gianluca Gianferrari (IT)

Categories	1st international winner	2nd international winner	3rd international winner
Power	Hashem Dardowra (SY)	Deepak Singh Dogra (IN)	Scott Portelli (AU)
Portfolio (Story-telling)	Ali Jadallah (PS)	Marek Biegalski (PL)	Sayed Ammar Alsayed Ahmed Alashoor (AE)
Drone (Video)	Karim Iliya (US)	Chrisander Bergan (NO)	Shantha Kumar Nagendran (IN)
Sports Photography	Vladimir Tadic (BA)	Ladislav Perenyi (DE)	Masatoshi Ujihara (JP)
Colour	Karine Aigner (US)	Jinhua Zhi (US)	Marcin Giba (PL)
Black and White	Edward John Grambeau (AU)	Christopher Fallows (ZA)	Yousef Bin Shakar Al Zaabi (AE)

=== 2026 - Family ===
Grand Prize Winner:

Categories	1st international winner	1st national winner	2nd international winner	2nd national winner	3rd international winner	3rd national winner
Family						
Dreams Through AI						
Sports Photography						
Portfolio						
General						
