= International Photography Awards =

Photography awards

The International Photography Awards are a group of awards for professional, non-professional and student photographers on a global scale which are awarded annually at the Lucie Awards gala. The winners of the main categories are invited to attend the gala to compete for the main award of International Photographer of the Year, receiving a Lucie statue and a cash prize of $10,000.

== History ==
The International Photography Awards were created by Hossein Farmani as part of the mission of the Lucie Foundation. They were initially presented in December 2003 at the Beverly Hilton Hotel in Los Angeles, California, at the Lucie Awards gala produced by Golden Globe nominee, Michelle Burstin.

In addition to honoring photographers, the Lucie Awards also showcase the finalists and winners of the International Photography Awards (Lucie Foundation's sister-effort) annual photography competition, presenting over $15,000 in cash prizes and two distinct titles: The International Photographer of the Year (given to a professional) and the Discovery of the Year (awarded to a non-professional).

In 2012, the Moving Image Photographer of the Year category was added, where six finalists competed to receive a Lucie statue and $2,500.

== Annual ceremonies and honorees ==
=== 2003 ===
The 2003 awards ceremony was the first, held at the International Ballroom of the Beverly Hilton Hotel in Los Angeles, California on December 7, 2003.

- International Photographer of the Year – Chris Frazer Smith
- Discovery of the Year – Robert Vizzini

=== 2004 ===
The 2004 awards ceremony changed location and time of year, held at the American Airlines Theater in New York City on October 18, 2004.

- International Photographer of the Year – Timothy White
- Discovery of the Year – Marrigje De Maar

=== 2005 ===
The 2005 awards ceremony was held at the American Airlines Theater in New York City on October 17, 2005.

- International Photographer of the Year – Jim Fiscus
- Discovery of the Year – Carol Watson

=== 2006 ===
The 2006 awards ceremony was held at the American Airlines Theater in New York City on October 30, 2006.

- International Photographer of the Year – Gerd Ludwig
- Discovery of the Year – Ghada Khunji

=== 2007 ===
The 2007 awards ceremony was held at the Avery Fisher Hall in the Lincoln Center in New York City on October 15, 2007.

- International Photographer of the Year – Massimo Mastrorillo
- Discovery of the Year – Larry Louie
- Deeper Perspective of the Year – Charlie Crane

=== 2008 ===
The 2008 awards ceremony was held at the Avery Fisher Hall in the Lincoln Center in New York City on October 30, 2008.

- International Photographer of the Year – Brent Stirton
- Discovery of the Year – John Delaney
- Deeper Perspective of the Year – Justin Maxon

=== 2009 ===
The 2009 awards ceremony was held at the Alice Tully Hall at the Lincoln Center in New York City on October 19, 2009.

- International Photographer of the Year – Nadav Kander
- Discovery of the Year – Elliott Wilcox
- Deeper Perspective of the Year – Rachel Papo

=== 2010 ===
The 2010 awards ceremony was held at the Alice Tully Hall at the Lincoln Center in New York City on October 27, 2010.

- International Photographer of the Year – Jim Krantz
- Discovery of the Year – Kristina Kostadinova
- Deeper Perspective of the Year – Rodney Rascona

=== 2011 ===
The 2011 awards ceremony was held at the Rose Theater, Jazz at the Lincoln Center in New York City on October 24, 2011.

- International Photographer of the Year – Majid Saeedi
- Discovery of the Year – Anna di Prospero
- Deeper Perspective of the Year – Daniel Beltrá

=== 2012 ===
The 2012 awards ceremony returned to its root, being held at the International Ballroom at the Beverly Hilton Hotel, the site of the first awards ceremony, in Los Angeles on October 8, 2012.

- Moving Image Photographer of the Year – Mark Bramley
- International Photographer of the Year – Alinka Echeverría
- Discovery of the Year – Viktoria Sorochinski
- Deeper Perspective of the Year – Fernando Moleres

=== 2013 ===
The 2013 awards ceremony was held at the Zankel Hall at Carnegie Hall, in New York City on October 27, 2013.

- Moving Image Photographer of the Year – Carson Davis Brown
- International Photographer of the Year – Brooks Kraft
- Discovery of the Year – Carlotta Cardana
- Deeper Perspective of the Year – Ebrahim Noroozi

=== 2014 ===
The Lucie Awards ceremony in 2014 was held at the Zankel Hall at Carnegie Hall, in New York City on November 22.

- Moving Image Photographer of the Year – Yannick Wegner
- International Photographer of the Year – Sandro Miller
- Discovery of the Year – Vyacheslav Mishchenko
- Deeper Perspective of the Year – K M Asad

=== 2015 ===
For the third year, the 2015 Awards ceremony was held at the Zankel Hall at Carnegie Hall, in New York City on October 27, 2015.

- Moving Image Photographer of the Year – Kerry Payne Stailey
- International Photographer of the Year – Maxim Dondyuk
- Discovery of the Year – Ville Kansanen
- Deeper Perspective of the Year – David Jay
- Honorable Mention(s) of the Year – Haider Ali (haidertonight)

=== 2016 ===
The Lucie Awards in 2016, was held on October 23 at the Zankel Hall at Carnegie Hall, in New York City.

- Moving Image Photographer of the Year - Lily Gilboy
- International Photographer of the Year – Marinka Masséus
- Discovery of the Year – David Nam Lip Lee
- Deeper Perspective of the Year – Andrea Star Reese

=== 2017 ===
The 2017 edition of the Lucie Awards was held at the Zankel Hall at Carnegie Hall, in New York City on October 29, 2017.

- Moving Image Photographer of the Year – Lebohang Kganye
- International Photographer of the Year – Alex Telfer
- Discovery of the Year – Mariano Belmar
- Deeper Perspective of the Year – Giles Clarke

=== 2018 ===
The 2018 awards ceremony was held at the Zankel Hall at Carnegie Hall, in New York City on October 28, 2018.

- International Photographer of the Year – Tawny Chatmon
- Discovery of the Year – Mohammad Rakibul Hasan

First Place winners in different categories were:

- Special – James Rushforth
- Advertising, Sandro Miller
- Book, Randal Ford
- Architecture, Stephan Zirwes
- Sports, Divyakant Solanki
- Moving image, Emily Kassie
- Deeper Perspective, Barry Salzman
- People, Tawny Chatmon
- Editorial, Rasmus Flindt Pedersen
- Event, Mia Collis
- Fine Art, Rodd Owen
- Nature, Melissa Cormican

=== 2019 ===
The 18th Annual Lucie Awards were postponed and will be rescheduled.

- International Photographer of the Year – Mustafa Hassona
- Discovery of the Year – Mikkel Hørlyck
- Advertising Photographer Of the Year – Jonathan Knowles
- Analog / Film Photographer Of the Year – Snezhana Von Büdingen
- Architecture Photographer Of the Year – Evgeny Stetsko
- Book Photographer Of the Year – Joey L.
- Deeper Perspective Photographer Of the Year – K. M. Asad
- Editorial / Press Photographer Of the Year – Mustafa Hassona
- Event Photographer Of the Year – Sandro Miller
- Fine Art Photographer Of the Year – David Knox
- Nature Photographer Of the Year – Tom Putt
- People Photographer Of the Year – Evgeny Stetsko
- Special Photographer Of the Year – James Ritchie
- Sports Photographer Of the Year – Kohei Ueno
- Still in Motion / Video Photographer Of the Year – Jean Bérard

=== 2020 ===
- International Photographer of the Year – Julia Fullerton-Batten
- Advertising Photographer Of the Year – Mike Dodd
- Analog / Film Photographer Of the Year – Paulius Makauskas
- Architecture Photographer Of the Year – Jesus M.Chamizo
- Book Photographer Of the Year – Sebastian Copeland
- Deeper Perspective Photographer Of the Year – Nicolo Filippo Rosso
- Editorial / Press Photographer Of the Year – Kiran Ridley
- Event Photographer Of the Year – Katja Ogrin
- Fine Art Photographer Of the Year – Chloe Meynier
- Nature Photographer Of the Year – Ari Rex
- Nature and Astrophotography Of the Year – Gary W. Lopez
- People Photographer Of the Year – Brian Hodges
- Special Photographer Of the Year – Sawyer Russel
- Sports Photographer Of the Year – Howard Schatz
- Still in Motion / Video Photographer Of the Year – Iwona Podlasinska

=== 2021 ===
Pro

- Advertising Photographer Of the Year – John Huet
- Analog / Film Photographer Of the Year – Angélique Boissière
- Architecture Photographer Of the Year – Julia Anna Gospodarou
- Book Photographer Of the Year – Delphine Blast
- Deeper Perspective Photographer Of the Year – Bob Newman
- Editorial / Press Photographer Of the Year – Mel D. Cole
- Event Photographer Of the Year – Chong Kok Yew
- Fine Art Photographer Of the Year – Mikael Owunna
- Nature Photographer Of the Year – Liselotte Schuppers
- People Photographer Of the Year – Art Streiber
- Special Photographer Of the Year – Howard Schatz
- Sports Photographer Of the Year – Andre Magarao
- Still in Motion / Video Photographer Of the Year – Shilpa Narayanan
- Nature and Astrophotography Of the Year – Gary W. Lopez

Non-pro

- Advertising Photographer Of the Year – Antonio Coelho
- Analog / Film Photographer Of the Year – Chris Round
- Architecture Photographer Of the Year – César Cedano
- Book Photographer Of the Year – Sue Park
- Deeper Perspective Photographer Of the Year – Joanna Borowiee
- Editorial / Press Photographer Of the Year – Sharwar Hussain
- Event Photographer Of the Year – Brian Wotring
- Fine Art Photographer Of the Year – Jiale Liu
- Nature Photographer Of the Year – Javier Rupérez
- People Photographer Of the Year – Elisa Miller
- Special Photographer Of the Year – Bernd Schirmer
- Sports Photographer Of the Year – Masatoshi Ujihara
- Still in Motion / Video Photographer Of the Year – Aitor del Arco

=== 2022 ===
- Advertising Photographer Of the Year – Jodie Mann
- Analog / Film Photographer Of the Year – Lukasz Spychala
- Architecture Photographer Of the Year – Ramin Barzegar
- Book Photographer Of the Year – Ed Kashi
- Deeper Perspective Photographer Of the Year – Paula Bronstein
- Editorial / Press Photographer Of the Year – Juan Carlos
- Event Photographer Of the Year – Alessandro Iasevoli
- Fine Art Photographer Of the Year – Nils Riedweg
- Nature Photographer Of the Year – Lars Beusker
- People Photographer Of the Year – Aaron Anderson
- Special Photographer Of the Year – Martin Stranka
- Sports Photographer Of the Year – James Lightbown
- Still in Motion / Video Photographer Of the Year – Sandro Miller

=== 2023 ===
Pro

- Advertising Photographer Of the Year – Thomas Broening
- Analog / Film Photographer Of the Year – Edgar Martins
- Architecture Photographer Of the Year – Gang Wang
- Book Photographer Of the Year – 93 photojournalists
- Editorial / Press Photographer Of the Year – Wolfgang Schwan
- Event Photographer Of the Year – Nabil West
- Fine Art Photographer Of the Year – Julia Fullerton-Batten
- Nature Photographer Of the Year – Barbara and Maciej Noskowski
- People Photographer Of the Year – Allison Hunter
- Special Photographer Of the Year – Horst Kistner
- Sports Photographer Of the Year – Finn O'Hara

Non-pro

- Advertising Photographer Of the Year – Yuliy Vasilev
- Analog / Film Photographer Of the Year – Daniela Balestrin
- Architecture Photographer Of the Year – Steffen Reichardt
- Book Photographer Of the Year – Jan Schölzel
- Editorial / Press Photographer Of the Year – Or Adar
- Event Photographer Of the Year – Thamarong Wanarithikul
- Fine Art Photographer Of the Year – Bevil Templeton-Smith
- Nature Photographer Of the Year – Claudia Gaupp
- People Photographer Of the Year – Carlo Marrazza
- Special Photographer Of the Year – Daniil Kobizskiy
- Sports Photographer Of the Year – Tony Law

=== 2024 ===
- International Photographer of the Year – Charles Niell Jr. Chaz
- Discovery of the Year – Malgorzata Fober

Pro

- Advertising Photographer Of the Year – Tom Franks
- Analog / Film Photographer Of the Year – Drew Gardner
- Architecture Photographer Of the Year – Gleici Rufatto
- Book Photographer Of the Year – Sebastian Copeland
- Editorial / Press Photographer Of the Year – Mustafa Hassona
- Event Photographer Of the Year – Charles Niell Jr. Chaz
- Fine Art Photographer Of the Year – Paul Szimák
- Nature Photographer Of the Year – Benjamin Yavar
- People Photographer Of the Year – Maryam Firuzi
- Special Photographer Of the Year – Dale May
- Sports Photographer Of the Year – Peter Muller

Non-pro

- Advertising Photographer Of the Year – Andrea Paolini Merlo
- Analog / Film Photographer Of the Year – Blake Burton
- Architecture Photographer Of the Year – Kiyoshi Karimizu
- Book Photographer Of the Year – Yuji Haikal
- Editorial / Press Photographer Of the Year – Jakub Laichter
- Event Photographer Of the Year – Mark Fromson
- Fine Art Photographer Of the Year – César Guardia Alemañi
- Nature Photographer Of the Year – Malgorzata Fober
- People Photographer Of the Year – Renee Barron
- Special Photographer Of the Year – Yukihito Ono
- Sports Photographer Of the Year – Markus Naarttijarvi

=== 2025 ===
Pro

- Advertising Photographer Of the Year – Jonathan Knowles
- Analog / Film Photographer Of the Year – Piotr Zbierski
- Architecture Photographer Of the Year – Romain Thiery
- Book Photographer Of the Year – Autori Multipli
- Editorial / Press Photographer Of the Year – Abdelrahman Alkahlout
- Event Photographer Of the Year – Savadmon Avalachamveettil
- Fine Art Photographer Of the Year – Julia Fullerton-Batten
- Nature Photographer Of the Year – Sho Otani
- People Photographer Of the Year – Natasha Pszenicki
- Special Photographer Of the Year – Pedro Luis Ajuriaguerra Saiz
- Sports Photographer Of the Year – Todd Antony

Non-pro

- Advertising Photographer Of the Year – Natalie Vorontsoff
- Analog / Film Photographer Of the Year – Yehor Lemzyakoff
- Architecture Photographer Of the Year – Mohammad Awadh
- Book Photographer Of the Year – Markus Naarttijarvi
- Editorial / Press Photographer Of the Year – Sebastian Piorek
- Event Photographer Of the Year – Yu Ling Ho
- Fine Art Photographer Of the Year – Marie Sueur
- Nature Photographer Of the Year – Ilene Meyers
- People Photographer Of the Year – Ilona Schong
- Special Photographer Of the Year – Monia Marchionni
- Sports Photographer Of the Year – Kohei Kawashima
