= Fiscus (disambiguation) =

Fiscus was the name of the personal treasury of the emperors of Rome. In modern times it refers to revenue from taxation.

Fiscus may also refer to:

- Fiscus, Iowa, an unincorporated community in Audubon County
- SS Fiscus, a UK cargo steamship that was built in 1928

== Fiscus as a surname ==
- Jim Fiscus
- Kathy Fiscus
- Lawson Fiscus
- Ross Fiscus
- Thomas J. Fiscus
