= Rushforth =

Rushforth is an English surname. Notable people with the surname include:

- Alfred Rushforth (1898–1985), Australian cricketer
- James Rushforth, British photographer, mountaineer, climber, and travel writer
- Peter Rushforth (1945–2005), English teacher and novelist
- Winifred Rushforth (1885–1983), Scottish medic
