= Viacheslav Mishchenko =

Ukrainian photo artist, painter (born 1978)

- В'ячеслав Міщенко
- Born: Viacheslav Volodymyrovych Mishchenko; 2 December 1964 (age 61); Berdychiv, Zhytomyr Oblast
- Education: Zhytomyr Medical School
- Occupations: Photo artist, painter

Viacheslav Volodymyrovych Mishchenko (Ukrainian: В'ячеслав Володимирович Міщенко, born 2 December 1964, Berdychiv, Zhytomyr Oblast) is a Ukrainian photographer and painter. 20 Years of Independence of Ukraine Medal (2011).

== Biography ==
In 1986, he graduated from Zhytomyr Medical School. From then until 1990, he worked as a dental technician at the Zhytomyr Hospital for the Disabled. He is currently working as a creative artist.

From 2002 to 2013, he was the head of the Union of Free Artists and Folk Masters "Vernisazh" in his hometown.

== Creative work ==
Mishchenko has been taking pictures since he was eight years old. He is fond of macro photography, and creates picturesque still lifes and landscapes in a realistic style. A collection of his photographs was published in Japan.

He held personal exhibitions in Berdychiv (2013–2014), Namur (2014), Tongeren (2015).

== Awards ==
Year	Category	Awards	Result	Ref
2014	Discovery of the year	International Photography Awards	Won	

== Gallery ==
=== Paintings ===
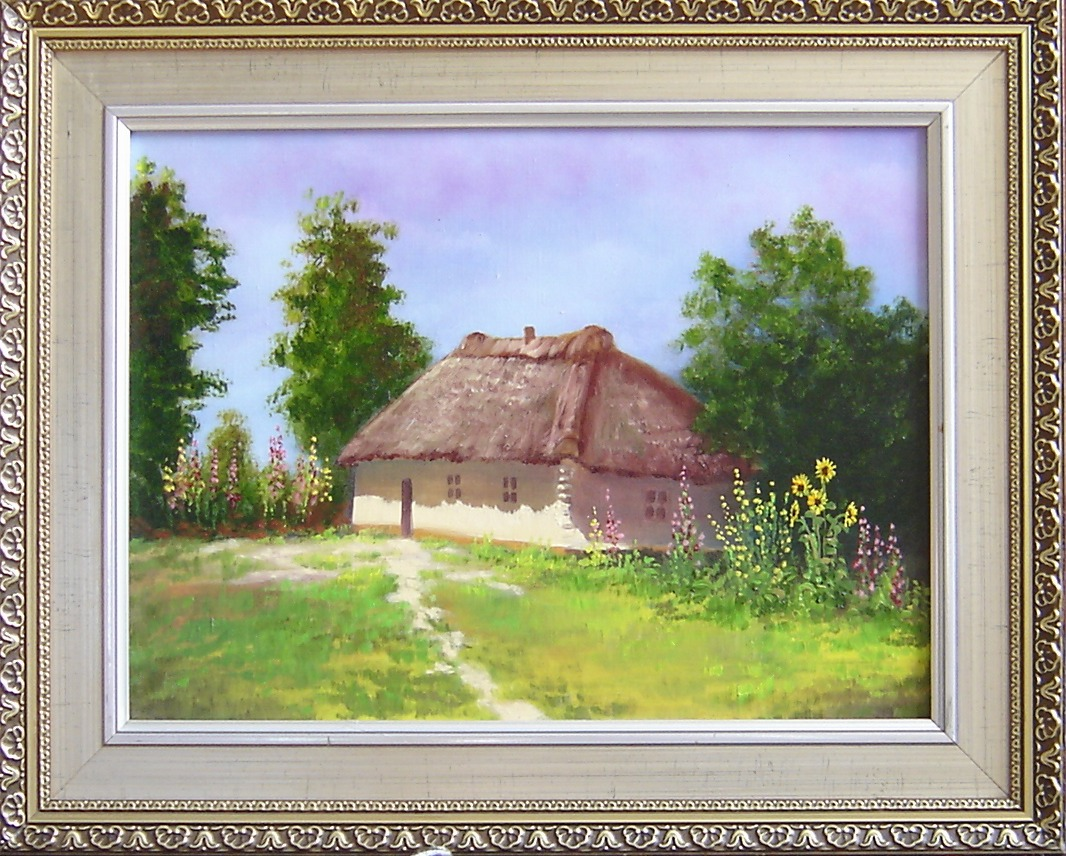
Batkivshchyna (Батьківщина)

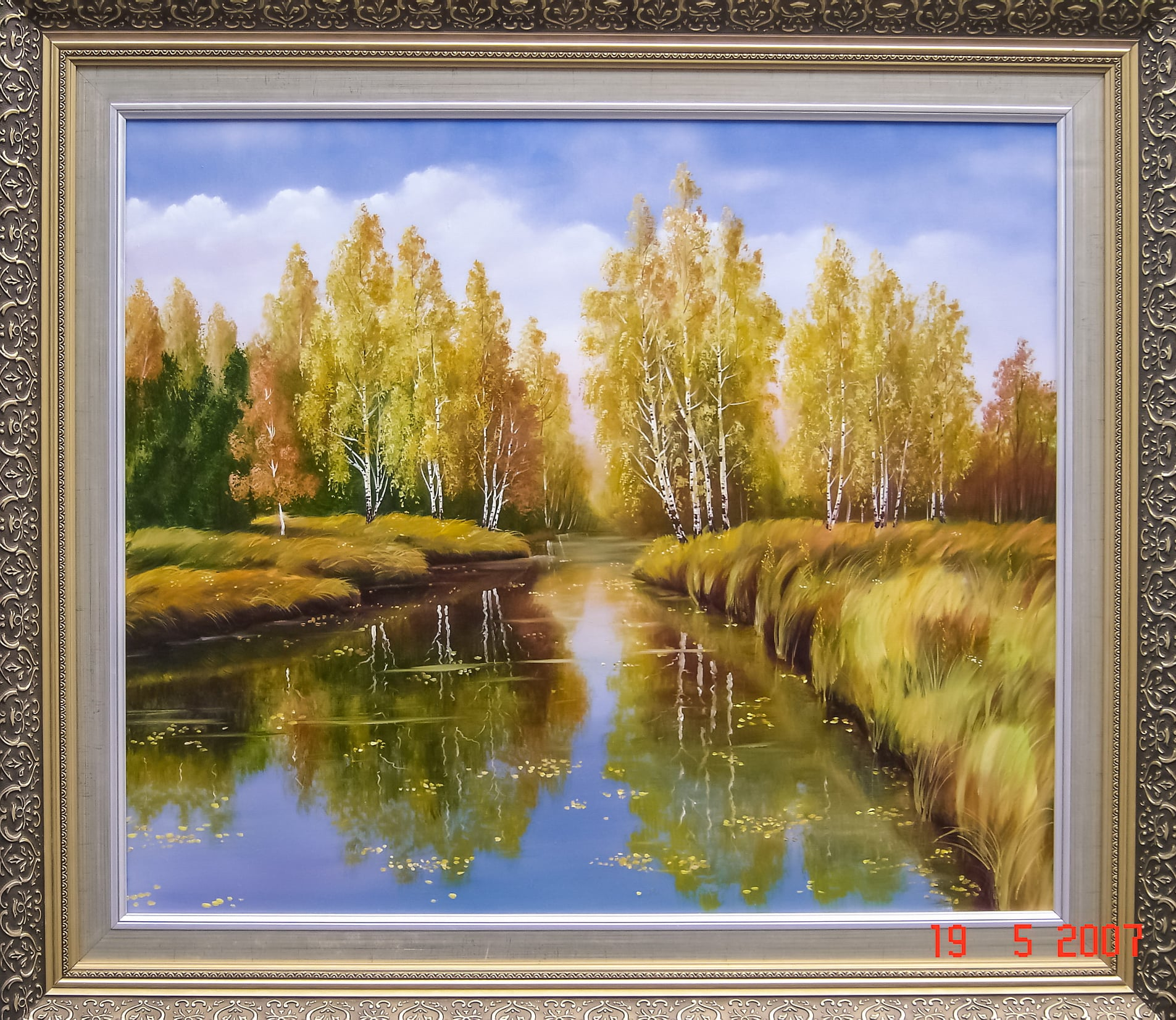
Rannia osin (Рання осінь)

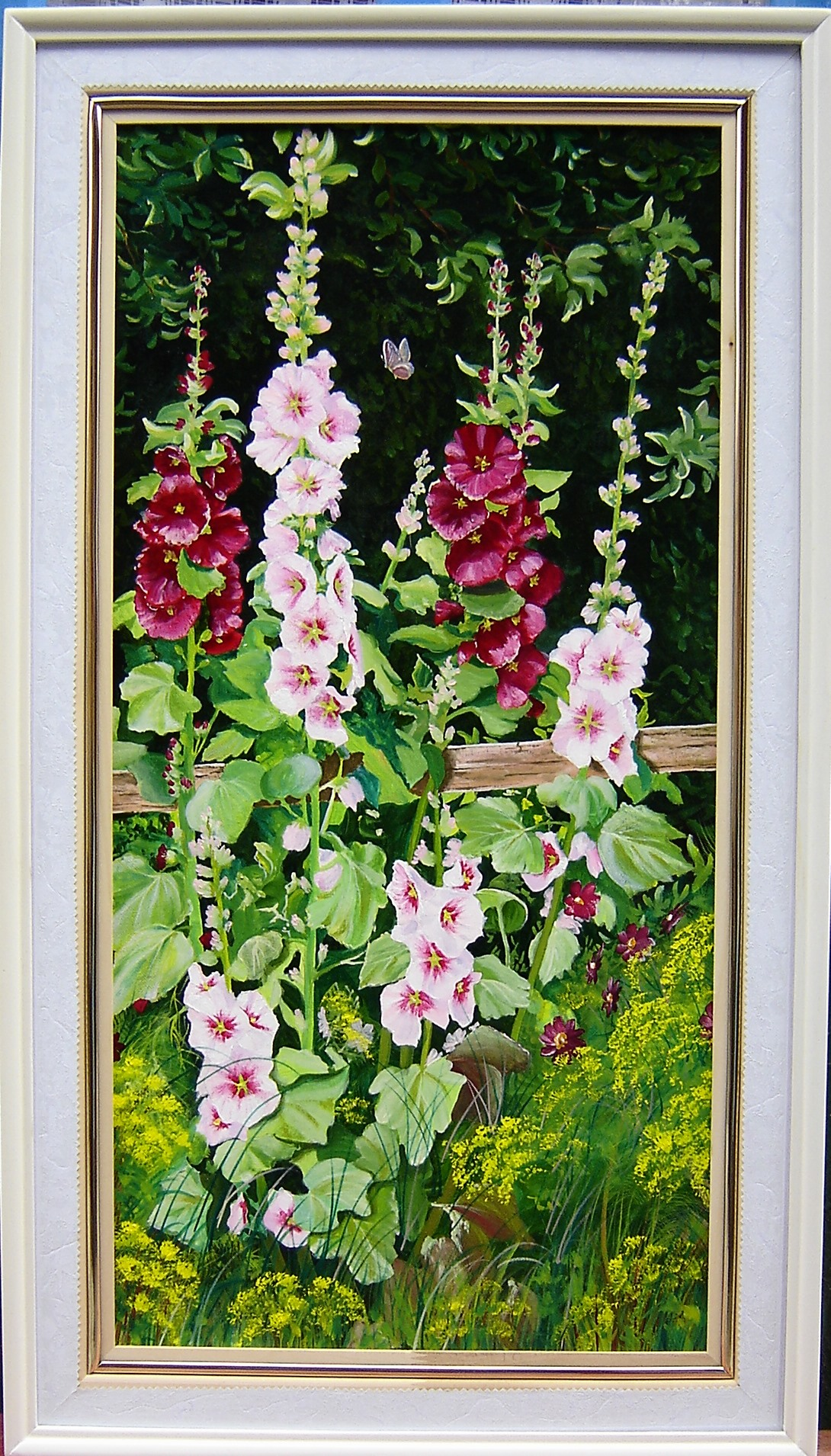
Malvy pry dorozi (Мальви при дорозі)

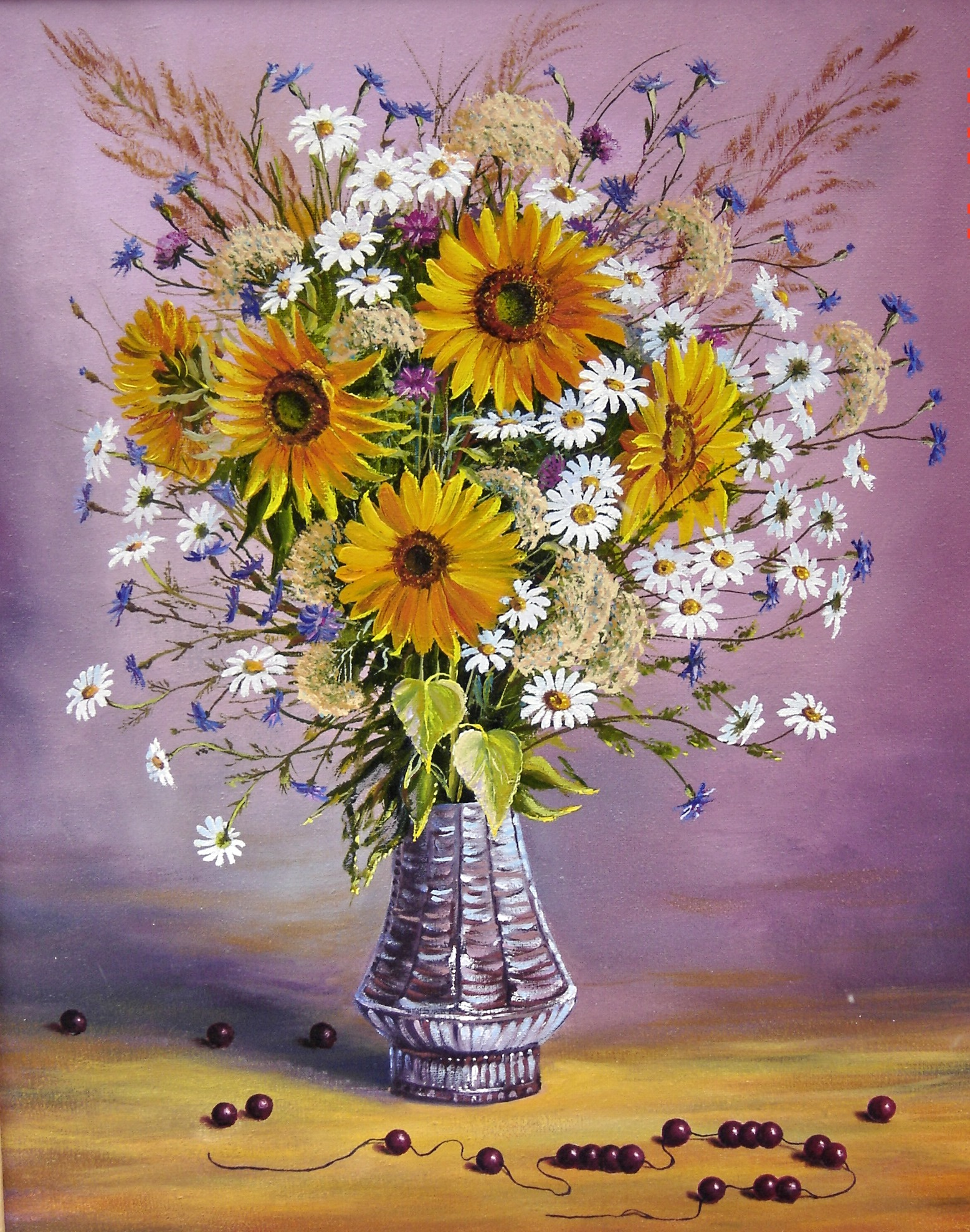
Natiurmort litnii (Натюрморт літній)

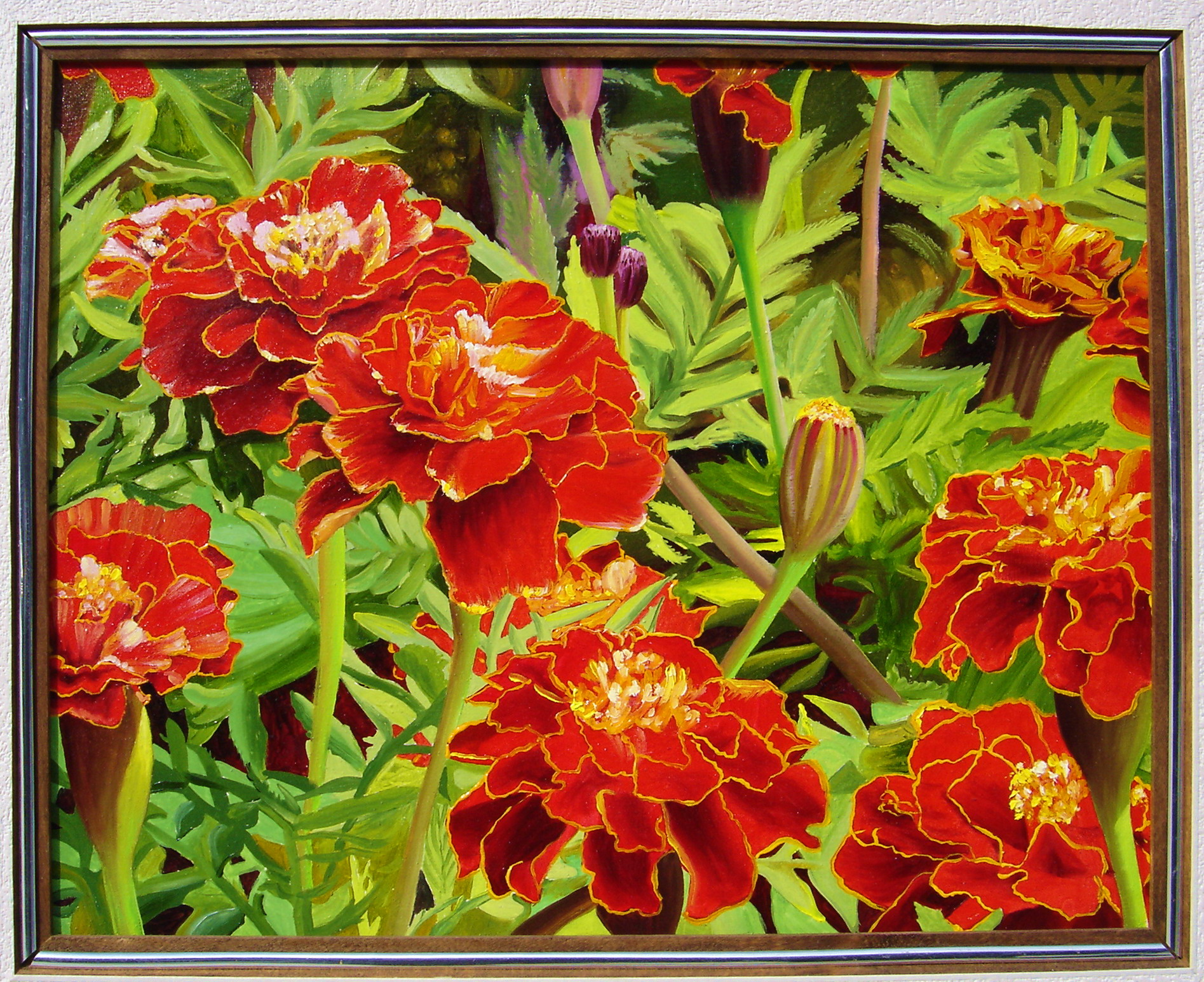
...iak na ti chornobryvtsi pohlianu (...як на ті чорнобривці погляну)

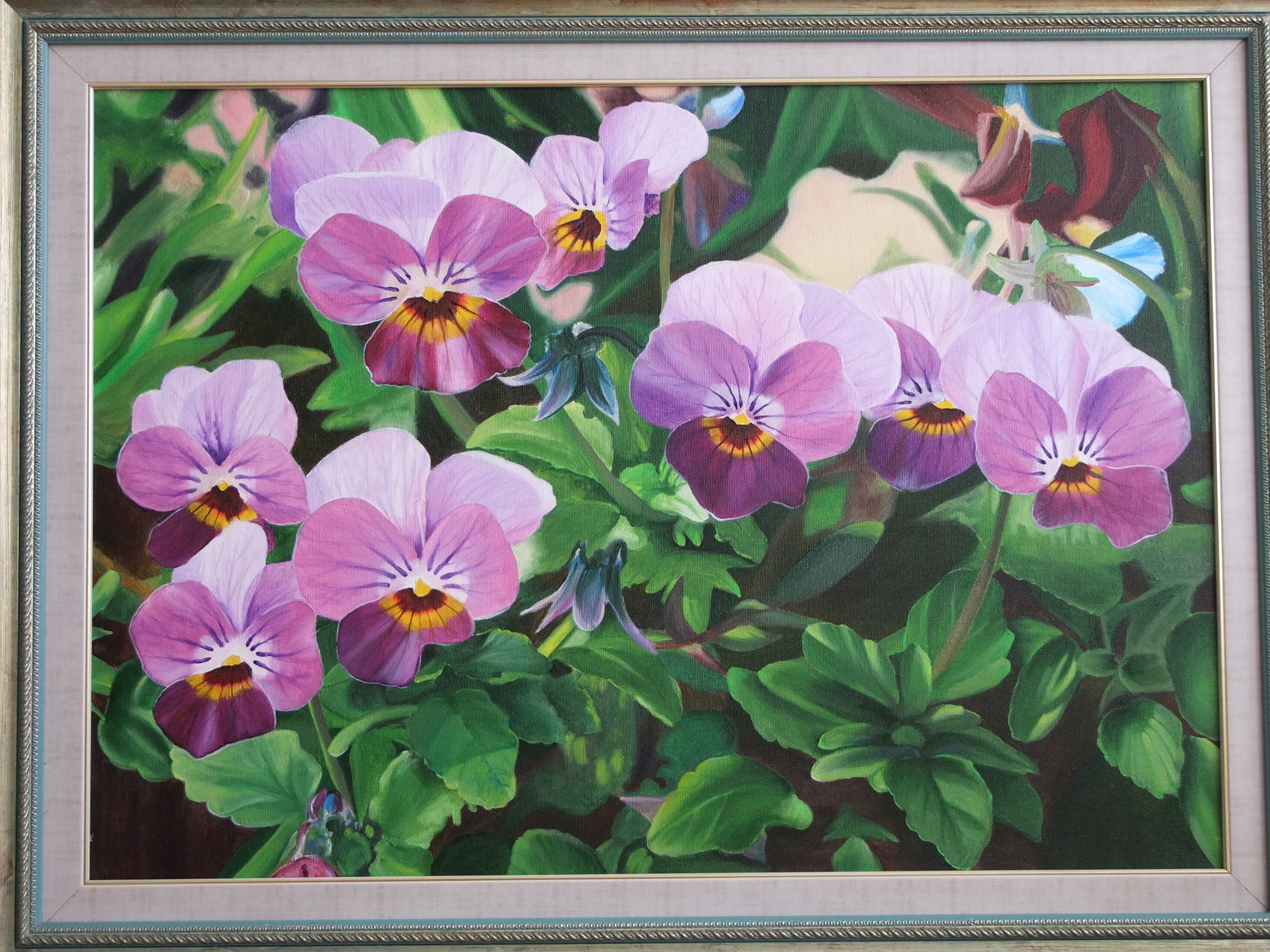
Brat i sestra (Брат і сестра)

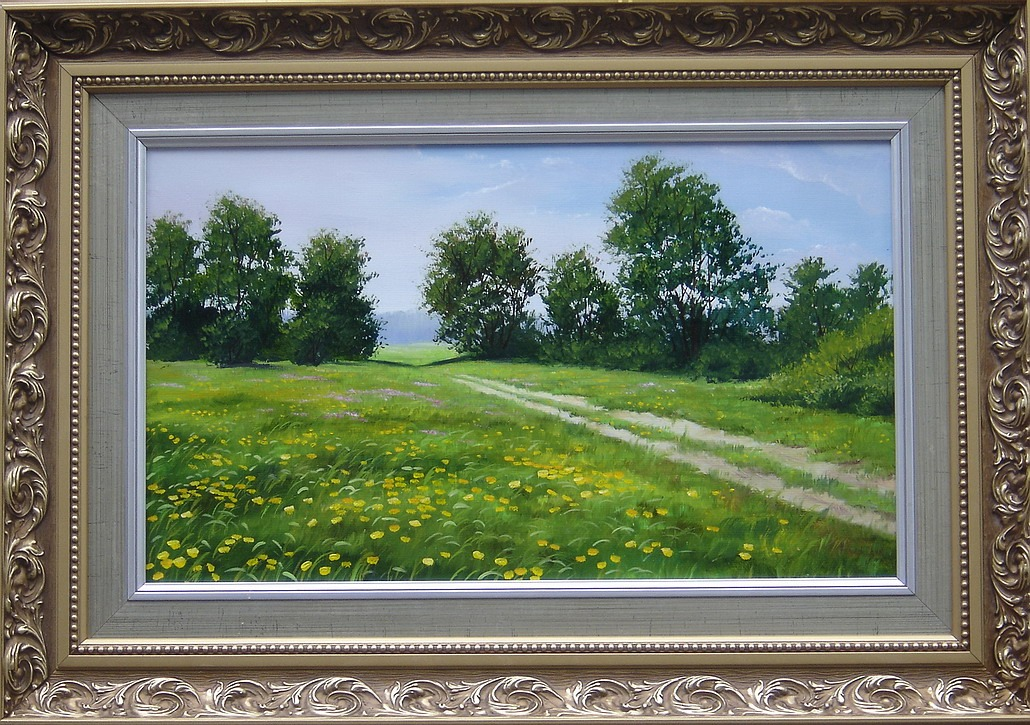
Okolytsi Slobodyshche (Околиці Слободище)

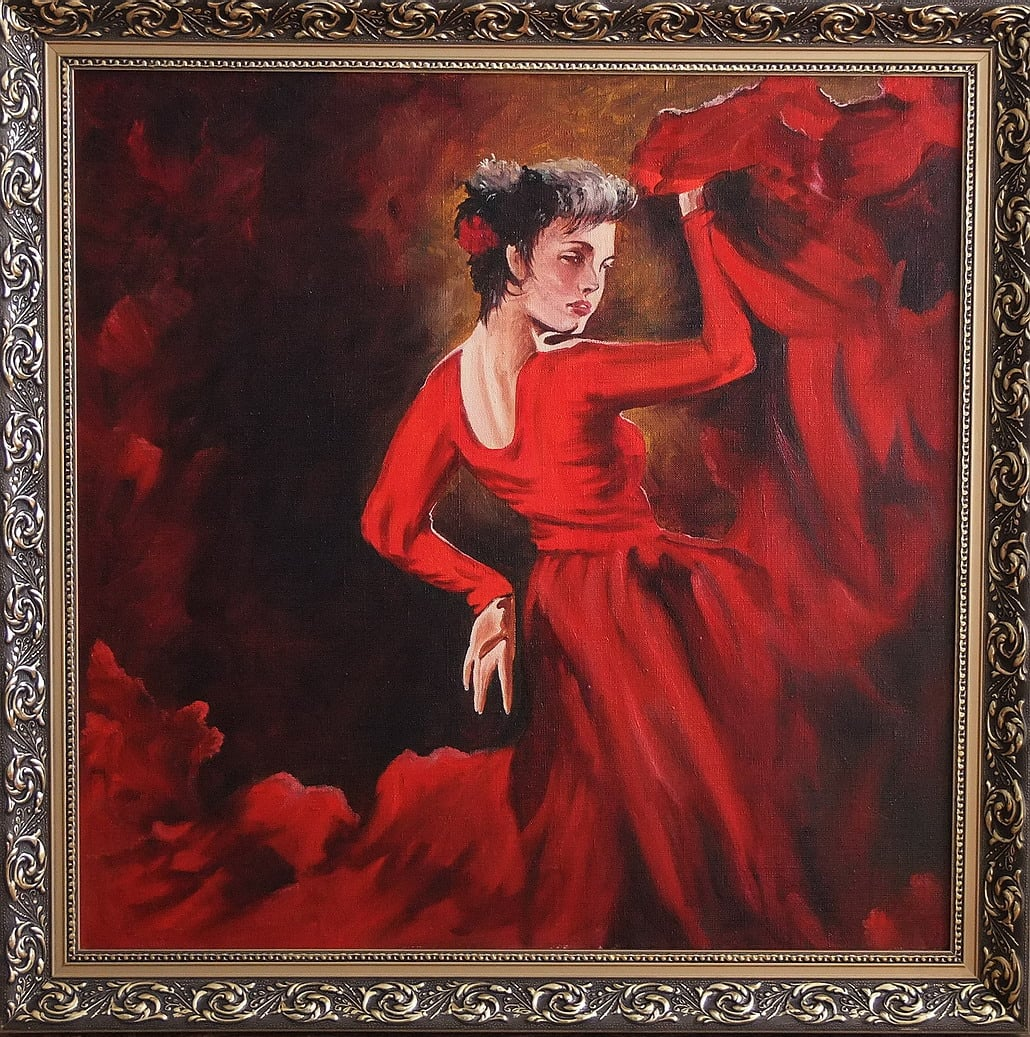
Flamenko (Фламенко)

=== Photo art ===
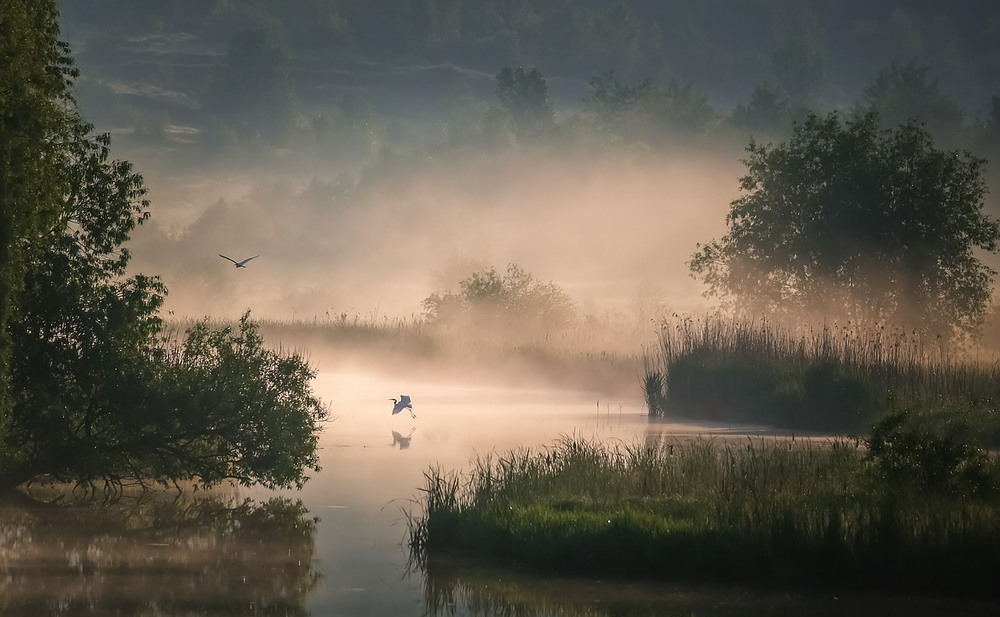
Bystryk... Zhytomyrshchyna (Бистрик... Житомирщина)

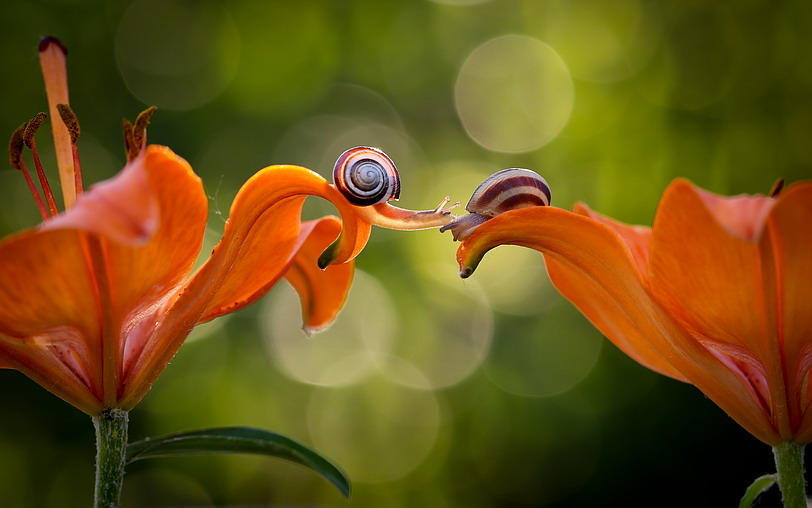
Moia nizhnists (Моя ніжність)

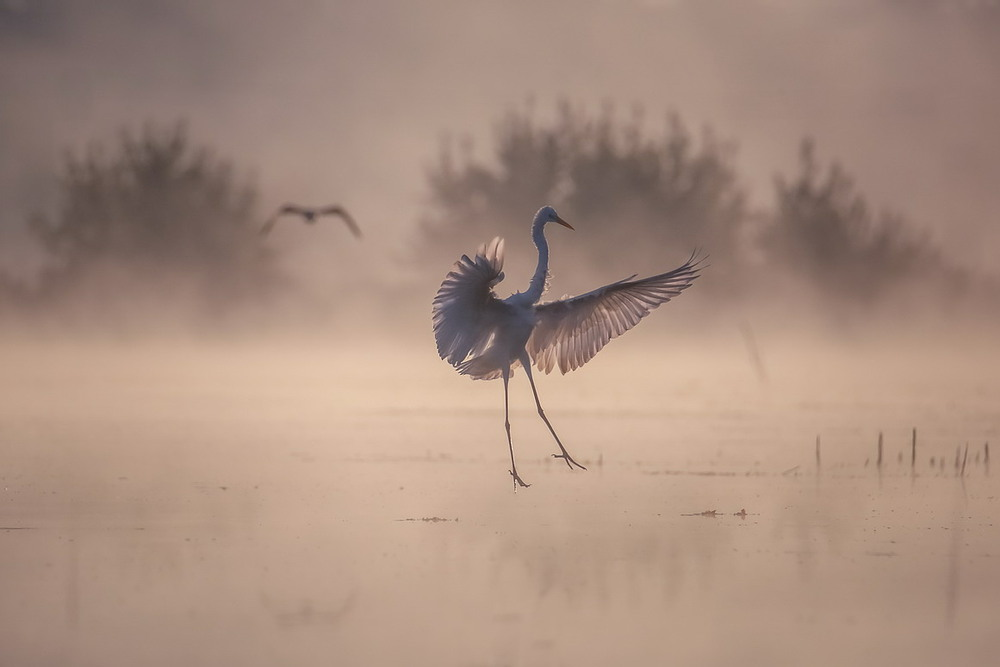
Chepura velyka na svitanku (Чепура велика на світанку)

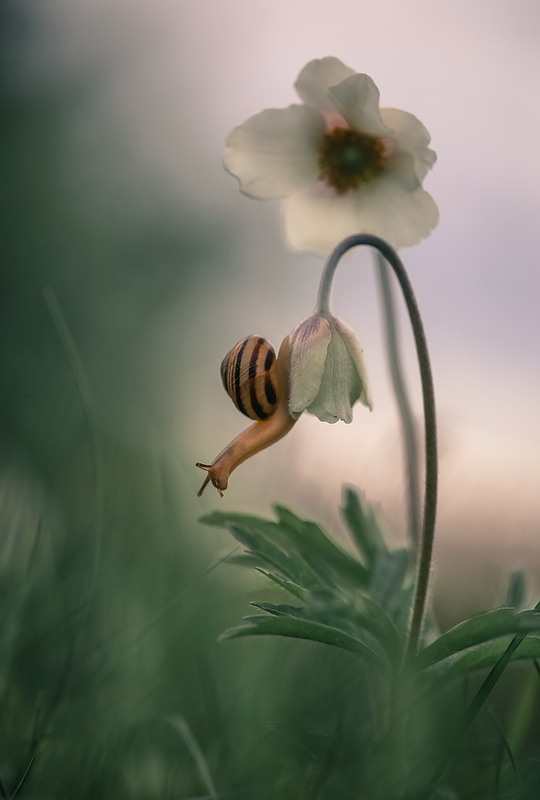
Na dalnii stantsii ziidu (На дальній станції зійду)

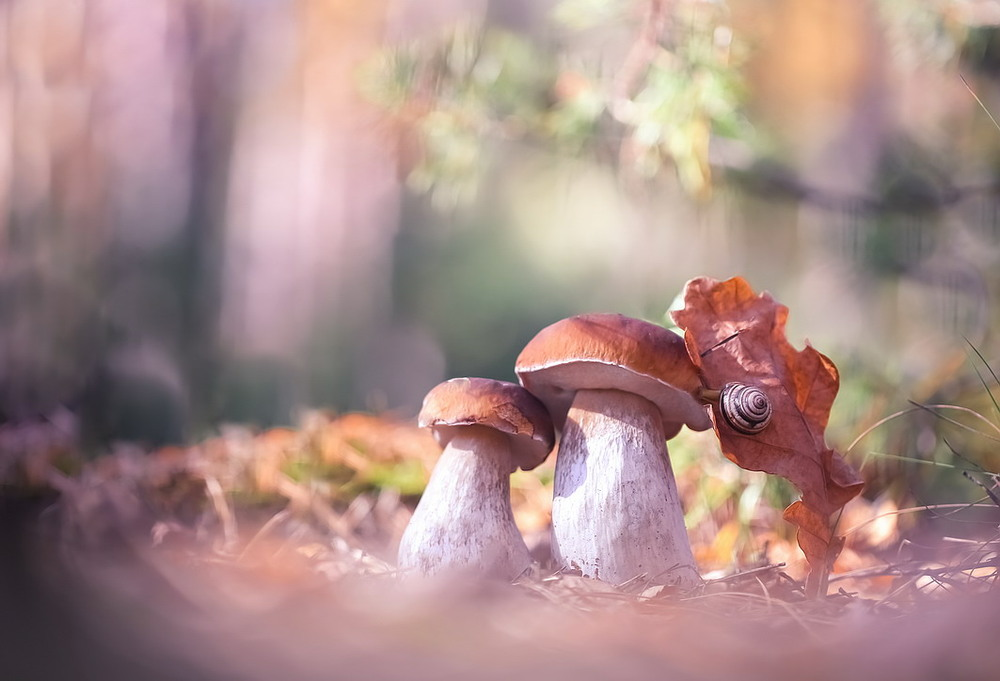
Nazavzhdy poruch (Назавжди поруч)

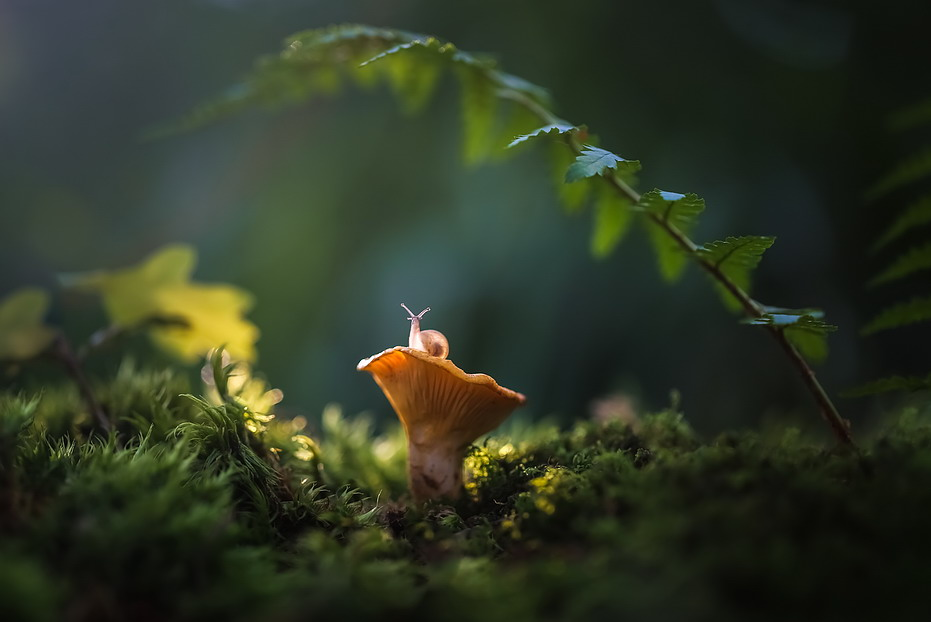
Zirka (Зірка)

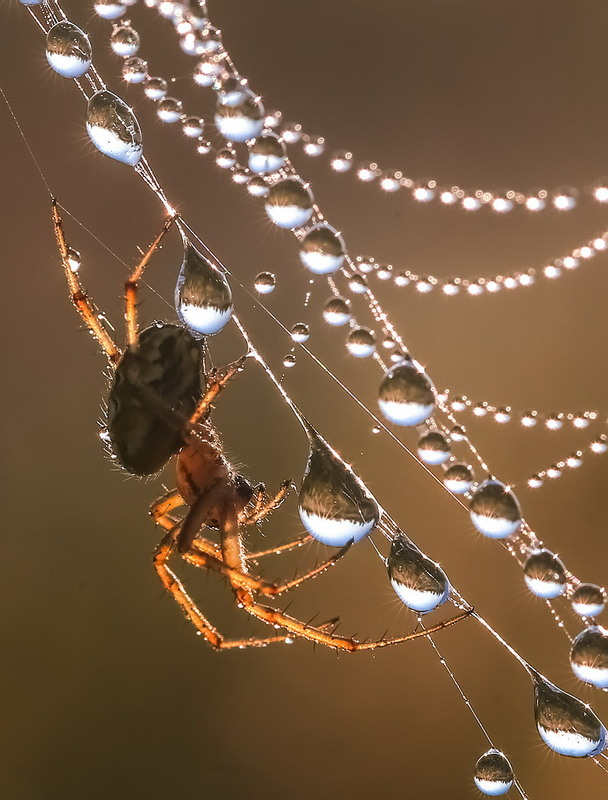
Merezhyva (Мережива)

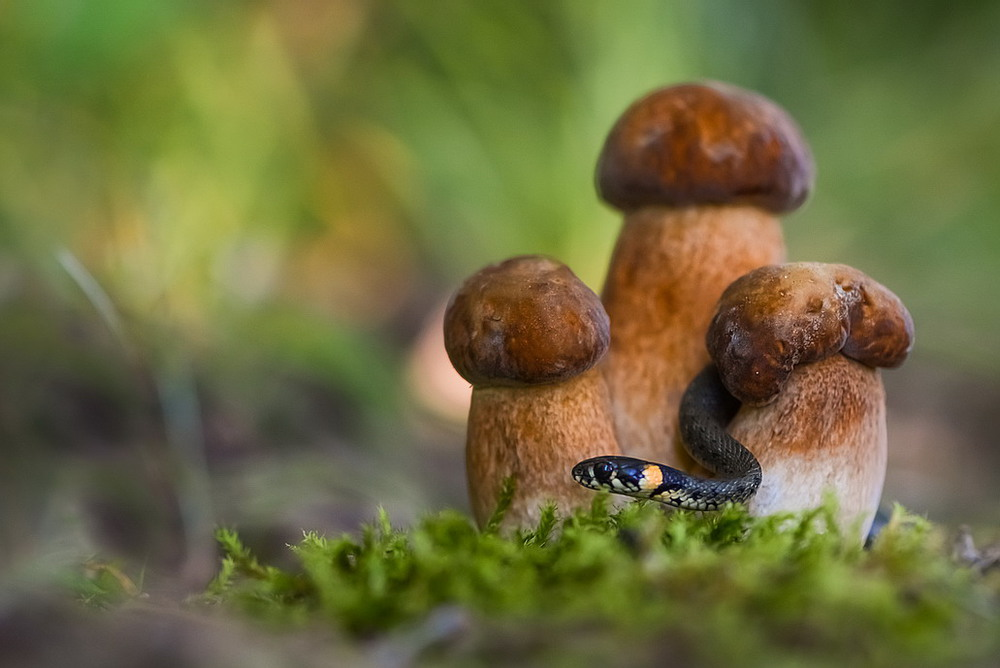
Krasunchyky (Красунчики)
