= Sandro Miller =

American photographer (born 1958)

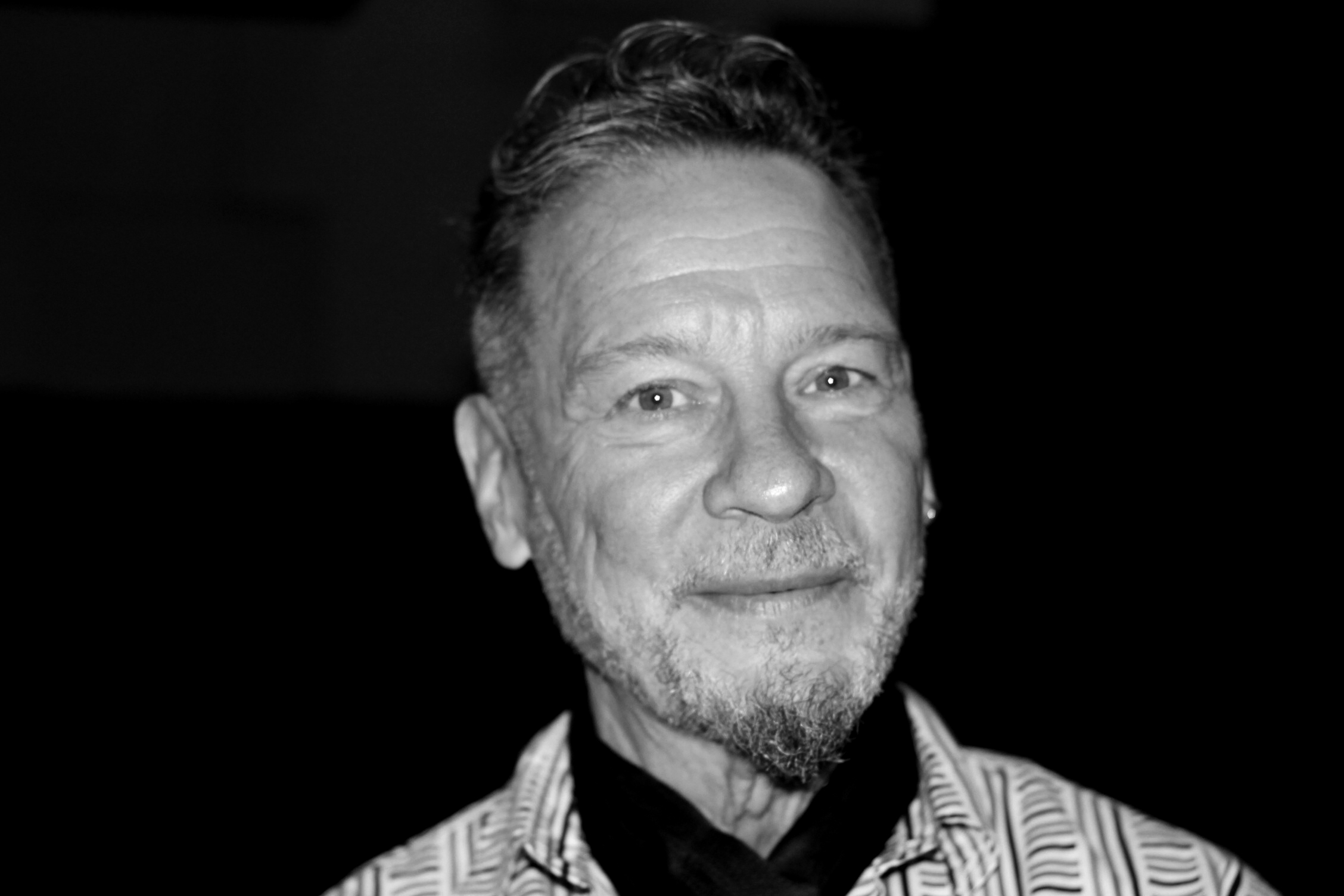
- Miller in 2018
- Born: 1958 (age 67–68); Elgin, Illinois
- Website: www.sandrofilm.com

Sandro Miller (born 1958), known professionally as Sandro, is an American photographer. He has worked with actor John Malkovich.

== Career ==
In 2001, Miller photographed Cuban Olympic athletes. This project was the first US/Cuban collaboration since the trade embargo began in 1960.

He has made promotional photography for Dance for Life, a Midwest performance-based AIDS fundraiser.

In November 2013 in Morocco, Miller made portraits of local tradesmen, nomadic people, snake charmers, fossil diggers, and Gnawa musicians.

In 2014, he re-created photographs paying homage to photographers in a project titled Malkovich, Malkovich, Malkovich: Homage to Photographic Masters, using John Malkovich as the subject in each image.

== Publications ==
- I Can't Accept Not Trying. 1994. ISBN 0-06-251190-4.
- American Bikers. 1998. ISBN 3-88814-356-X.
- Sandro: Figure E Ritratti. 2002. ISBN 88-8314-181-4.
- Imagine Cuba 1999-2007. 2008. ISBN 978-88-8158-692-9.
- El Matador, Joselito: A Pictorial Novel. 2009. ISBN 978-88-8158-771-1.
- Sandro Raw, Steppenwolf. 2012.
- Eyes of Morocco. 2014.
- Finding Freedom. 2015. Photographs by Miller and poems by recently incarcerated individuals living at St. Leonard's Halfway House.
- The Malkovich Sessions. 2016. ISBN 978-0-9962930-3-7.
- Dance for Life. 2016.

== Exhibitions ==
=== Solo exhibitions ===
- Scavi Scaligeri International Center for Photography, Verona, Italy, October 2002 – January 2003. A retrospective exhibition of personal work.
- Cuban photographs, including a series of black-and-white portraits of elderly Cubans, Chicago Cultural Center, October–December 2010
- Provocative Imperfections, Safety-Kleen Gallery at Elgin Community College, October–November 2012. The show included Cuban Portraits, Massa and a selection from Butts & Fronts.
- Seen/Unseen at Loyola University School of Communications, Chicago, March–August 2013. Work from American Bikers, Atropa, Cuban Portraits, Massa, and Peering In: Images of an Over Stimulated Society.
- Malkovich, Malkovich, Malkovich: Homage to Photographic Masters, The Lumiere Brothers Center for Photography, Moscow, June–August 2016; Krasnoyarsk Museum Center, Krasnoyarsk, Russia, October–December 2016. Also included 3 short films.

=== Group exhibitions or at festivals ===
- Malkovich, Malkovich, Malkovich: Homage to Photographic Masters, Rencontres d'Arles, Arles, France, 2015.

== Awards ==
- 2011: Saatchi & Saatchi Best New Director Award, Cannes Lions International Festival of Creativity, for the short video Butterflies featuring John Malkovich
- 2014: "International Photographer of the Year Award", Lucie Awards, Lucie Foundation
- 2015: "International Photographer of the Year Award", Lucie Awards, Lucie Foundation, for Malkovich, Malkovich, Malkovich: Homage to Photographic Masters
- 2016: Advertising Photographer of the Year, International Photography Awards, for "Advantage Humans" campaign made for the American Cancer Society
- 2016: Grand-prize International Motion Art Awards winner, AI-AP Big Talkhis, for the short film Hell, starring Malkovich
