= Aed Abu Amro =

Palestinian protester

Photo of Aed Abu Amro during the Great March of Return in Gaza taken by Mustafa Hassona on 22 October 2018

Aed Abu Amro (Arabic: عائد أبو عمرو) is a Palestinian man from Zeitoun, Gaza. In 2018, a photo of him hurling a rock during the Great March of Return protest against Israeli blockade, taken by photojournalist Mustafa Hassona on 22 October 2018, went viral and became a symbol of Palestinian resistance. The photo has been compared to the 1830 French revolutionary painting Liberty Leading the People.

== Background ==
=== Israeli blockade on Gaza ===
The blockade of the Gaza Strip is an ongoing land, air and sea blockade imposed by both Israel and Egypt since 2007, which has severely limited the movement of people and goods into and out of the territory, leading to a humanitarian crisis that has had a devastating impact on the population of Gaza. The blockade has been the subject of international criticism and has been condemned by numerous human rights organizations for its detrimental effects on the civilian population. The blockade has also been a major source of tension between Israel and the Palestinians and has contributed to the ongoing conflicts in the region.

Aed Abu Amro, a Palestinian from Zeitoun in the Gaza Strip, was a regular participant in the weekly "Great March of Return" protests, which began in 2018 and called for an end to the Israeli blockade on Gaza, and the right for Palestinian refugees to return to their ancestral homes.

== Photograph ==
Liberty Leading the People, a French painting celebrating the July Revolution in 1830, has been compared to Hassona's photo of Amro.

Abu Amro was photographed by Mustafa Hassona during the Great March of Return protest in Gaza on 22 October 2018, and the image went viral shortly after its creation. The picture shows Amro bare-chested, holding a Palestinian flag in one hand, while hurling a sling with the other hand over his head. He appears to be standing in front of a cloud of smoke, and the intensity of his gaze and the determination in his posture have made the photo an iconic symbol of the Palestinian struggle for freedom and justice.

The photo was compared to Liberty Leading the People by French painter Eugene Delacroix, which allegorically depicts the July Revolution of 1830 that overthrew King Charles X. Some interpreted the imagery as a representation of a biblical tale of David versus Goliath, whereas others considered the depiction to be a celebration of violence, as some reports have referred to Abu Amro as a "Palestinian extremist" and linked him to riots on the border between Gaza and Israel. One commentator said that the oppression of Palestinians is not something that can be romanticised or viewed through a poetic lens, as the reality of life in Gaza is one of constant suffering and loss.

== Aftermath ==
Abu Amro was reportedly shot in the leg by an Israeli sniper in November 2018 while participating in a demonstration in support of the Just Future For Palestine Flotilla, which set sail to challenge Israel's naval blockade. He was seen being carried away on a stretcher by medics while holding the Palestinian flag and making the sign of peace.

== Mustafa Hassona – awards ==
Hassona, who is also from the Gaza Strip, received numerous awards for the photo, including Siena International Photo Awards 2024, International Photography Awards 2019 and 2024, the Pictures of the Year International award 2016, Sony World Photography Award 2019, Malta International Photo Award 2018, and All About Photo Photographer of the Year 2019. He was also a finalist in the LensCulture Visual Storytelling Awards 2019.
