= Tawny Chatmon =

American photographer and artist

- Born: 1979 (age 45–46); Tokyo
- Occupation: Photographer
- Website: www.tawnychatmon.com

Tawny Chatmon (born 1979) is an American photographic artist known for her portraits of Black children overlaid with gold leaf and paint.

== Career ==
Chatmon was born in Tokyo in a military family, an "army brat" who traveled the world. She eventually was raised in Montgomery County, Maryland. She became a self-taught commercial photographer but after she created a photographic record of her father's illness and death from cancer in 2010, she turned away from commercial work and instead began to focus more on Black children, including her own.

God's Gift by Tawny Chatmon (2019) Archival pigment print with gold leaf and acrylic paint, Minneapolis Institute of Art

Colossal, a website of contemporary art, noted that Chatmon's use of overlapping layers of paint and 24-karat gold leaf, along with semi-precious stones, glass, and other mixed media, draws influences from artist Gustav Klimt and Byzantine masterpieces. Chatmon then displays her work in gilded golden frames, often repurposed from old master paintings. She was drawn to old master art while growing up in Germany and visiting museums and palaces "but was haunted by the negative historical representations of Black figures in European and American art as well as their absence.”

Chatmon often manipulates the images of confidant Black boys and girls, paying special attention to their hair, before adding layers of gold paint. In doing so, she “reinforces magnificence and pride” in a world where Black hair styles often are viewed as unkempt and unprofessional. She also introduces symbols such as such as circles, birds and suns and upside-down hearts, found on the graves of the last known ship carrying enslaved people to arrive in the United States.

Chatmon features "her subjects, their bountiful hair resplendent in coils and curls, and their glistening brown skin in shades from chestnut to mahogany, against a stark white background," according to The Washington Post magazine, though in more recent work "young subjects are rendered into historical landscape paintings, in hues of gentle greens and blues."

"Her work, a mixture of painting and portraiture, is a regal reflection of Blackness," wrote Boston Globe culture columnist Jeneé Osterheldt. "Her work is so often a response to the ways in which our hair, our clothes, and our culture are criminalized. She uses gold paints and rich tones to illustrate our worth."

In 2018 Chatmon was named International Photographer of the Year at the International Photography Awards. "Her portfolio is brimming with blends of multiple genres of visual art, and her photographs speak volumes," the IPA announcement said. "With her precise and detailed execution and her beautiful and well-thought concepts, her distinct style stands out from the crowd."

In 2019-2020, Chatmon was featured in a solo exhibition at Fotografiska New York, a branch of the Swedish photography museum Fotografiska in Gramercy Park, Manhattan, New York City. That exhibit highlighted works from her series "Redemption," featuring photographs of young Black girls with a variety of hairstyles—braids, curls, knots—and 24-karat gold paint. In 2021, Galerie Myrtis organized another solo exhibition in Baltimore as well as at the Joan Hisaoka Healing Arts Gallery in Washington, DC. That show included the artist’s stark black-and-white photos of her father, James “Rudy” Muckelvene, in the months before his death. The World Gold Council in 2021 produced a video that focused on her use of gold in her art.

Chatmon's work has been purchased by the Minneapolis Institute of Art as well as by Beyoncé Knowles, Alicia Keys and CCH Pounder. One of her 2021 pieces, "Remnants/I Affirm That the World Around Us is Harmonious & Peaceful," sold at auction in 2022 at Christie's for $25,500. Several of her works were also exhibited at the Afro-Futurist Manifesto exhibit associated with the 59th Venice Biennale in 2022. In October 2025, the National Museum of Women in the Arts (NMWA) mounted a five-month solo exhibition, "Sanctuaries of Truth, Dissolution of Lies," that highlighted a significant evolution in Chatmon's craft, in which she explores the conceptual and visual possibilities of embroidery and textile.

== Personal life ==
Chatmon lives in Annapolis with her husband Kartan and three children.
