= Majid Saeedi =

Iranian photographer

- مجید سعیدی
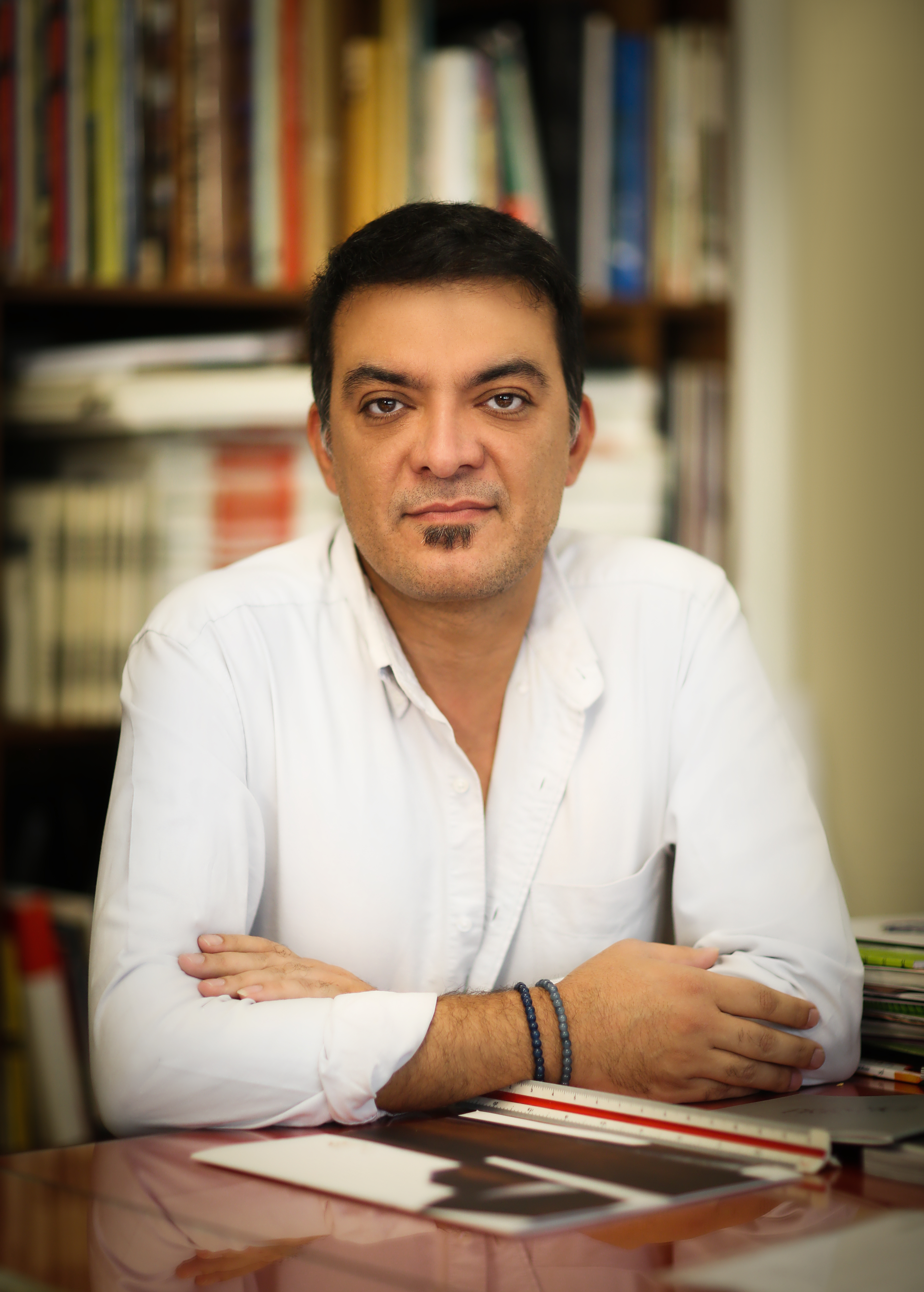
- Born: 1974 (age 51–52); Tehran, Iran
- Occupation: Photographer
- Years active: 1989–present
- Website: majidsaeedi.com

Majid Saeedi (Persian: مجید سعیدی; born 1974) is an Iranian documentary photographer.

== Early life ==
Saeedi was born and raised in Tehran. He started photography at sixteen and has photographed humanitarian issues in the Middle East. Saeedi has appeared in international publications and won numerous awards.

== Career ==
He has managed photography departments of various news agencies in Iran.

Saeedi has won photography awards from around the world. He has received the title of "The Best Photographer of Iran" eight times. His photos havebeen published in international publications, including The Times, Der Spiegel, Life, The New York Times, The Washington Post, The Washington Times, Time, and various Middle Eastern publications and online agencies.

Saeedi has traveled to many countries in the Middle East and photographed injustice and atrocities. One photo story displayed the images of Afghan people whose lives have been affected by the decades of war in Afghanistan.

== Arrest and imprisonment ==
On 9 September 2026, Saeedi was arrested at his home in Tehran. Three weeks after his disappearance, his family reported they had received no information about his whereabouts.

== Awards ==
- 2009 & 2005 POYi Awards, US
- 2010 UNICEF Award, (Germany)
- 2010 International Press Photo Contest (CHIPP), China
- 2010 Henri Nannen Award, Germany
- 2011 Lucie Award, US
- 2012 Robert F. Kennedy Award, US
- 2013 World Press Photo (WPP), Netherlands
- 2013 National Press Photographers Association (NPPA), US
- 2013 International Press Photo Contest (CHIPP), China
- 2013 RPS Wall Grant, Japan
- 2014 Master Award, Italy
- 2014 Foto Evidence Book Award, US
- 2014 Lucas Dolega Award, France
- 2015 Photo Reporter, France
- 2018 Top 10 photographer Sente·Antu Cup” International Photo Contest China
- 2020 2nd prize Istanbul Photo, Turkey

== Exhibitions ==
- Siena Art Gallery, Italy 2016
- Goethe Gallery, India 2016
- Arp Museum, Germany 2015
- Esquina Gallery, Marseille, France 2015
- Bronx Documentary Center, New York City 2015
- Charlwood Art Gallery, UK 2014
- Photo Museum Estonia, 2014
- la maison des photographs, Paris, France, 2014
- Lody Gallery, Milan, Italy 2014
- Peace Foundation Special Review, Bolzano Italy, 2014
- Uk Gallery −2013
- 25th Anniversary of Visa Pour L'Image, Perpignan, France, 2013
- Reminder Photography Stronghold Wall Grant, Tokyo, Japan, 2013
- Photo Report/ Age Festival Pmarico, Basilicata, Italy, 2013
- Noorderlicht Gallery, Groningen, Netherlands, 2012
- VII Gallery New York City, 2011
- And Plus 30 Group Exhibitions

== Books ==
- Life in War, US
- Daily Life, France
