= James Rushforth =

British photographer and writer

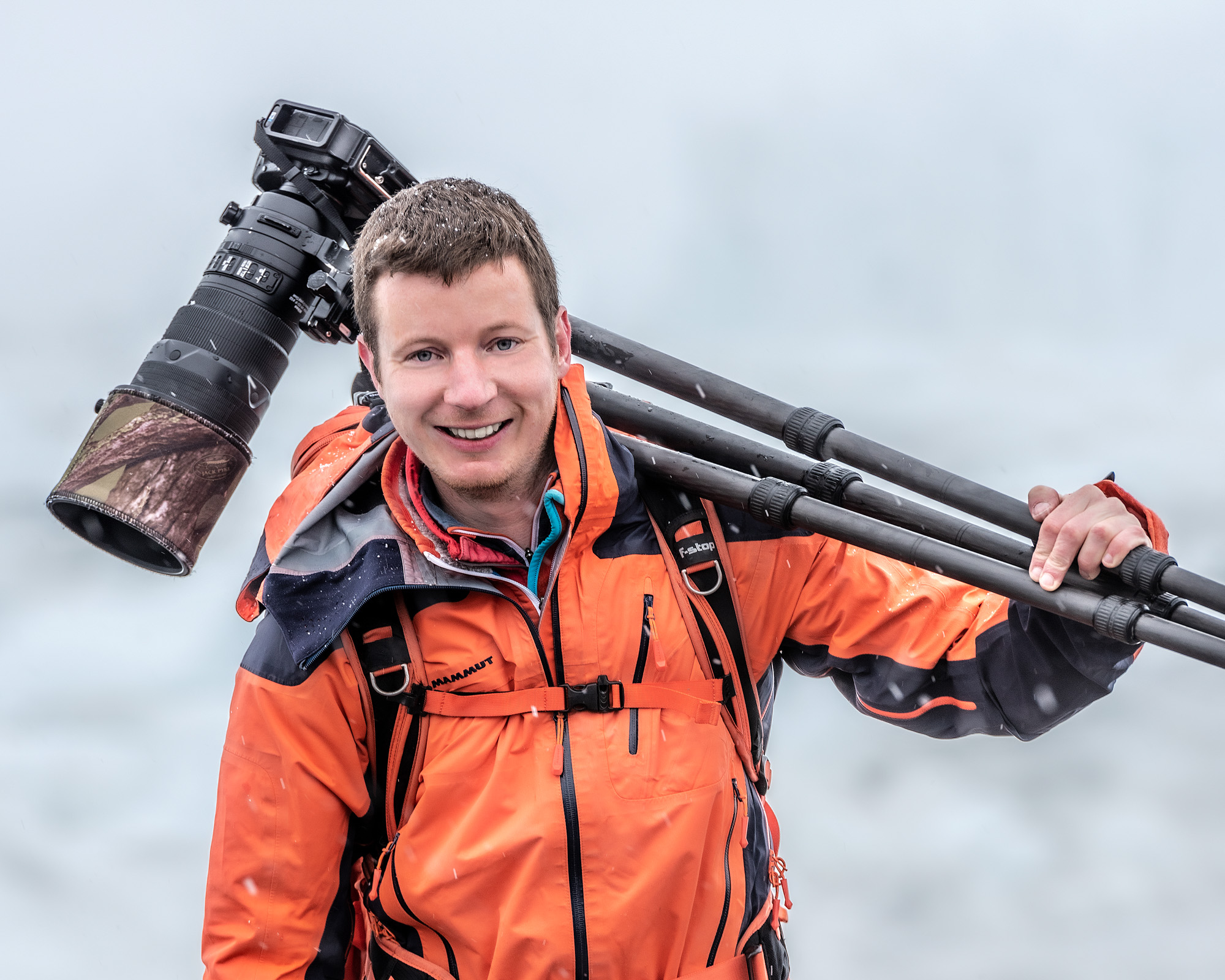
- Born: Gravesend, Kent, UK
- Occupation: Photographer
- Website: jamesrushforth.com

James Rushforth is a British photographer, mountaineer, climber, and travel writer, especially known for his two guide book series, on Iceland and the Dolomites. He is also known for his travel, nature, landscape, and extreme sport photographs, many of which have been recognized at the International Photography Award, the Siena International Photo Award, and the Px3 – Prix de la Photographie. Rushforth's photos have been displayed in national newspapers, travel magazines, and other media.

== Biography and education ==
Rushforth was born in Gravesend, Kent and raised in Worcester, where he attended Dyson Perrins and King's Schools. After completing his undergraduate degree at Durham University in 2007, he travelled to the Italian Dolomites where he began work on his first publication – a climbing and via ferrata guidebook for British publisher Rockfax.

== Career ==
Rushforth has gained significant professional merits as a photographer and also as a writer. His Iceland photo-location guidebook series won the Travel/Photography category of the Best Indie Book Awards (BIPA), whilst his book series on the Dolomites have been favored by several reviewers. Two of his publications were shortlisted as finalists for the Guidebook category at the Banff Mountain Book Festival in 2015 and 2017. Rushforth was consecutively named in 2018, 2019, and 2020 as Photographer of the Year by the British Guild of Travel Writers. Rushforth has participated as an invited judge at photo contests, such as those by Viewbug and the Australian Society of Travel Writers. An extensive interview with the author was published in 2019.

== Works ==
=== Books ===
- Rushforth, James, (2014). The Dolomites – Rock Climbs and Via Ferrata. Rockfax Ltd. ISBN 978-1-873341-97-1.
- Rushforth, James, (2017). Photographing the Dolomites – A travel & photo-location guidebook. Fotovue Ltd.. ISBN 978-0-9929051-6-3.
- Rushforth, James, (2017). Ski Touring And Snowshoeing In The Dolomites – 50 Winter Routes. Cicerone Press. ISBN 978-1-85284-745-6.
- Rushforth, James, (2018). Via Ferratas of the Italian Dolomites Volume 1. Cicerone Press. ISBN 978-1-85284-846-0.
- Rushforth, James, (2021). Photographing Iceland Volume 1 – A travel & photo-location guidebook. Fotovue Ltd. ISBN 978-1-9160145-5-8.
- Rushforth, James, (2021). Photographing Iceland Volume 2 – Highlands & Interior. Fotovue Ltd. ISBN 978-1-9160145-6-5.

=== Notable photos ===
Several of Rushforth's images have been featured in newspapers including The Guardian, The Times, The Mirror, and The Telegraph, where they have twice been selected among the Pictures of the Day. In 2019 National Geographic included his "sailing image in Greenland" amongst their favourite out of 10 million.

Photos taken by Rushforth that have been honored at contests include:

- The image Sunset at the Tre Cime was doubly awarded at the 2014/2015 Marmot Photography Award, the jury described the work as "technically impeccable, spot-on composition and exposure, and real depth".
- Walking High in the Dolomites gained an Honorable mention at the 2016 Siena International Photo Awards (travel).
- At the Lucie Awards (IPA), Honorable mentions were adjudicated to the pieces Mary's Shell by Night (Night Photography, 2016), Haifoss Sunset (Landscape, 2018), and Highlining in the Dolomites (Extreme Sport, 2018).
- Making the exposed traverse on pitch 4 of ‘Via ‘Myriam’ earned the author First place in the Digital Splash Photographer of the Year 2018 competition, simultaneously with first places in the sport and landscape categories.
- Dreaming of Iceland received Silver Prize at the Tokyo Photo Awards, 2018.
- Crater Row saw Rushforth awarded at the International Landscape Photographer of the Year in 2019, gained him second place in the drone category of the 2019 International Photo Awards, and won Drone Photographer 2020 at the British Photography Awards competition.
- The image Not your regular crevasse has been repeatedly awarded with prizes, including the Marmot Photography Awards in 2018 (Winner of the Expedition Category), the Bronze prize in Nature/Earth at the PX3 – Prix de la Photographie in Paris, 2019, and the IPA Award 2018 (Special and Travel / Tourism category winners).
- Comet Neowise over Stonehenge was the runner up in the Historic Britain category of the Landscape Photographer of the Year, a finalist in the 2021 Astronomy Photographer of the Year and Sony World Photo Awards, and received a double gold at the 2021 Le Prix de la Photographie de Paris Awards (PX3), in both the travel and night categories.
- A five image Dolomites portfolio won first place at the 2020 GTMA Global Travel Awards.
- His extreme sport themed storyboard "European adventurous travel” submitted to the Outdoor Writers & Photographers Guild led Rushforth to win the 2021 Photographer of the Year Award.

=== Exhibitions ===
Rushforth's work has been exhibited at the London National Maritime Museum, London Bridge and several other London Underground stations.
