= Andrea Star Reese =

American photographer

- Born: March 14, 1952 (age 74); Milwaukee, Wisconsin, U.S.
- Occupations: documentary photographer photojournalist
- Website: www.andreastarreese.com

Andrea Star Reese (born March 14, 1952, in Milwaukee) is a documentary photographer and photojournalist based in New York City who has done work in Indonesia as well as the United States. Her BFA and MFA are from the California Institute of the Arts school of Film/Video and she graduated from the International Center of Photography's Documentary Photography and Photojournalism program.

Reese received The Lucie Award-Deeper Perspective Photographer of the Year in 2016, the 2014 David Pike Award for Excellence in Journalism Photography, Best Social Documentary from the 2009 New York Photo Festival, and was a finalist for the 2011 POYI, World Understanding Award.

Most recently, Reese contributed to Innovation & Equality, a photography series and exhibition by United Nations Development Programme 2017. She also exhibits in Visa Pour L’Image in Perpignan, Musee de L’Elysee or Angkor Photo Festival.

Her photobook "Urban Cave", a photo reportage on unsheltered men and women living underground in New York City was published in 2015 by FotoEvidence. She has been published Internationally.
