= Rachel Papo =

American photographer (b. 1970)

- Born: 1970 (age 55–56)
- Education: Ohio State University (BFA, 1996); School of Visual Arts, New York (MFA, 2005)
- Website: rachelpapo.com

Rachel Papo (born 1970, Columbus, Ohio) is an American photographer, photojournalist, and book author. In her most recent photo series and publication about motherhood, Papo documents her own experience of postpartum depression.

== Early life and education ==
Rachel Papo was born in Columbus, Ohio and raised in Israel. She began photographing as a teenager attending a fine arts high school in Haifa. She later served in the Israeli Air Force as a photographer.

She holds a bachelor of fine arts from Ohio State University (1991-1996), and a master of fine arts in Photography from the School of Visual Arts, New York (2002-2005).

== Work ==
=== Series ===
==== Homeschooled ====
The images in the series Homeschooled depict the everyday life of house educated children in Upstate New York, and their activities. Papo established home in Upstate in 2010 and develop a curiosity by parents' skepticism of the American education system and their homeschooling strategies.

==== Serial No. 3817131 ====
The series documents the lives of female soldiers from the Israeli Defense Forces, which Rachel Papo also served as a photographer for two years. Images of this series were included in the traveling exhibition and accompanying publication WAR/PHOTOGRAPHY: Images of Armed Conflict and Its Aftermath at the Museum of Fine Arts, Houston in 2012.

==== Desperately Perfect ====
A photo essay looking into the inner happenings of the Vaganova Academy of Russian Ballet in St. Petersburg, where ballerinas in training as young as the age of ten practice daily for twelve hours until they reach the age eighteen. Pepo documented an iteration of the project photographing the New York City Ballet dancers in 2012.

== Collections ==
Papo's work is featured in the collections of the Pérez Art Museum Miami, Florida; the Museum of Fine Arts, Houston, Texas; the Griffin Museum of Photography, Massachusetts; and the Museum of Contemporary Photography, Chicago, Illinois; among others.

== Awards ==
Rachel Pepo was a 2009 Lucie Award for Deeper Perspective of the Year awardee; a recipient of a 2006 New York Foundation for the Arts (NYFA) Fellowship; a finalist for the Santa Fe Prize for Photography.

== Monographs ==
- Serial No. 3817131 (2008)
- Homeschooled (Kehrer Verlag, 2016)
- It’s Been Pouring – The Dark Secret of the First Year of Motherhood (2022)
