= Jim Fiscus =

American photographer

Jim Fiscus is an American photographer specializing in editorial and advertising photography, including several highly regarded campaigns for the Showtime series Dexter, starring Michael C. Hall. Fiscus, who is based in Athens, Georgia, has won many awards for his work, including at the 2005 International Photo Awards for his portraits of hip-hop and R&B artists Jay-Z, Usher, and Outkast. Also in 2005, he was named International Photographer of the Year at the Lucies, and he is the winner of the 2008 International Aperture Award for his photograph of English chef and best-selling cookbook author Jamie Oliver, commissioned by Channel 4 in the U.K. In 2009, his photographic novella, “The Unfortunate Moment of Misunderstanding,” was displayed at Industrial Color’s M Project Gallery in New York in June 2009.
