= Collodion process =

Early photographic technique

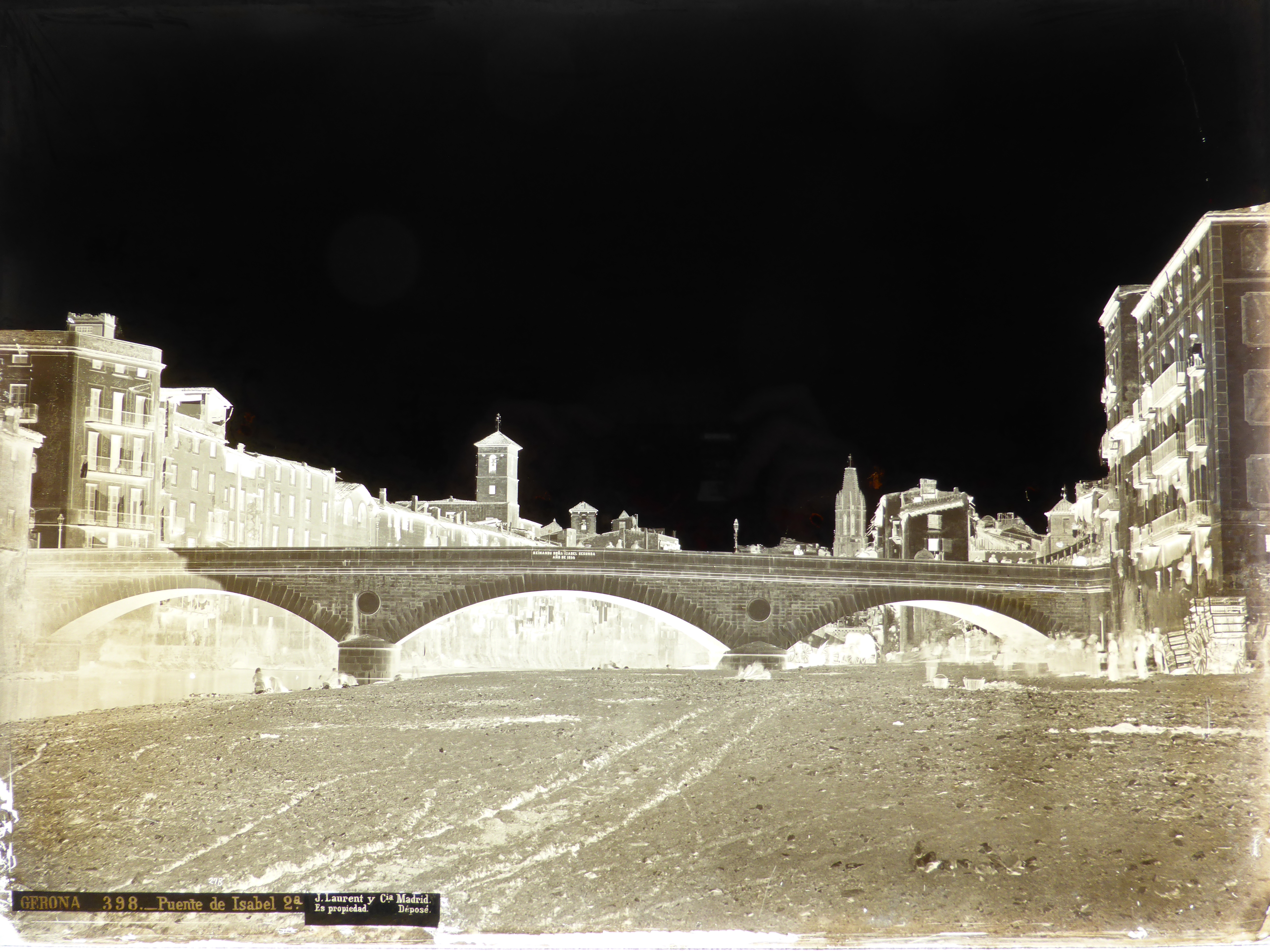
A collodion wet plate negative of Girona, Spain, c. 1867

The collodion process is an early photographic process for the production of grayscale images. The collodion process – mostly synonymized with the term "wet-plate process", requires the photographic material to be coated, sensitized, exposed, and developed within the span of about fifteen minutes, necessitating a portable darkroom for use in the field. Collodion is normally used in its wet form, but it can also be used in its dry form, at the cost of greatly increased exposure time. The increased exposure time made the dry form unsuitable for the usual portraiture work of most professional photographers of the 19th century. The use of the dry form was mostly confined to landscape photography and other special applications where exposure times sometimes longer than a half hour were tolerable.

== History ==
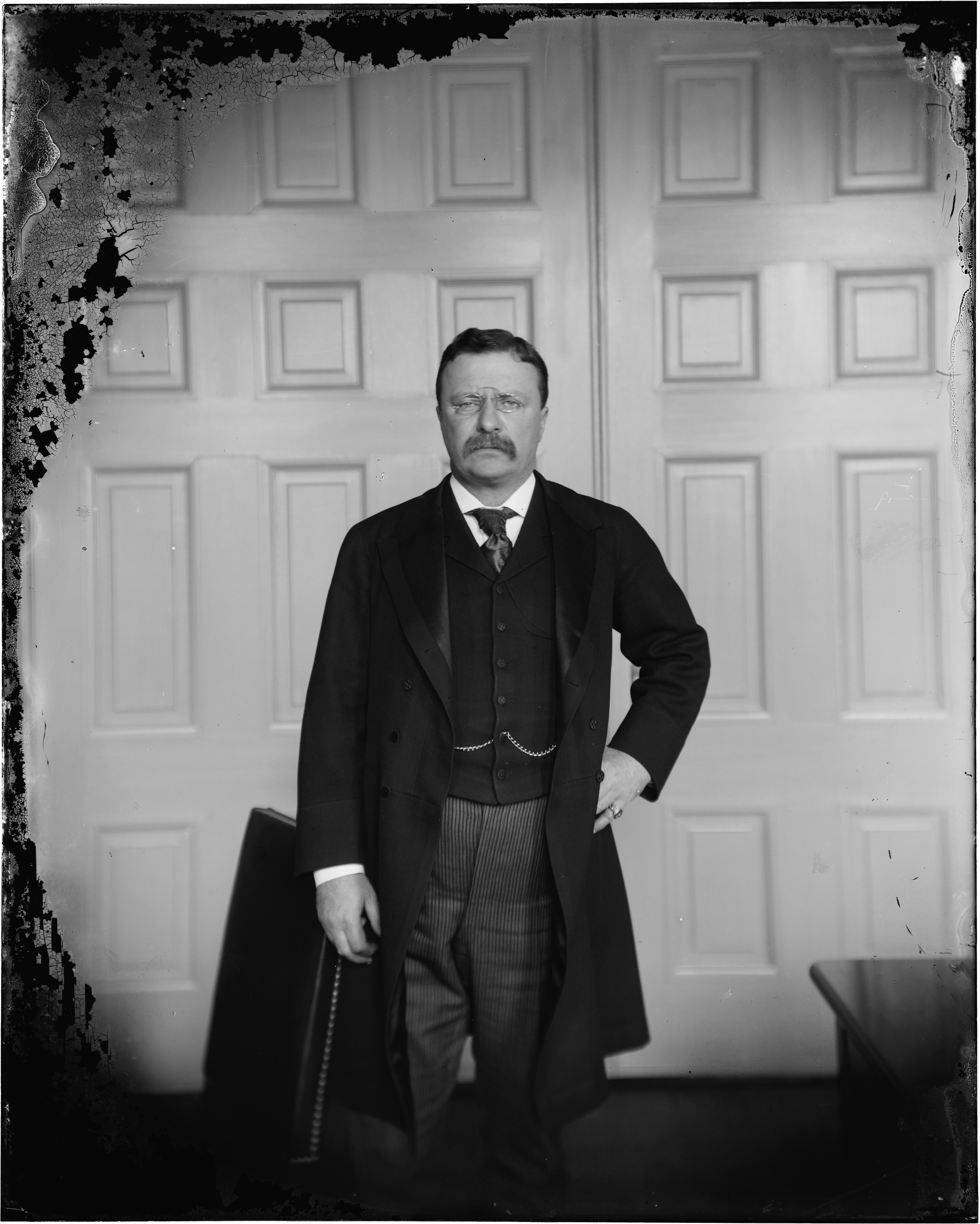
This deteriorated dry plate portrait of Theodore Roosevelt is similar to a wet plate image but has substantial differences.

Gustave Le Gray first theorized about the collodion process, publishing a method in 1850 that was "theoretical at best", but Frederick Scott Archer was credited with the invention of the process, which he created in 1848 and published in 1851. During the subsequent decades, many photographers and experimenters refined or varied the process. By the end of the 1860s, it had almost entirely replaced the first-announced photographic process, the daguerreotype.

During the 1870s, the collodion process was largely replaced by gelatin dry plates—glass plates with a photographic emulsion of silver halides suspended in gelatin. Invented by Dr. Richard Leach Maddox in 1871, dry gelatin emulsion was not only more convenient, but it could also be made much more sensitive, greatly reducing exposure times. This marked the beginning of the modern era of photography.

One collodion process, the tintype, was in limited use for casual portraiture by some itinerant and amusement park photographers as late as the 1930s, and the graphic arts industry continued to use wet collodion plates into the mid-20th century for producing halftone-screened negatives, and the practice of stripping and transferring the collodion film remained in use into the 1960s.

== 21st century ==
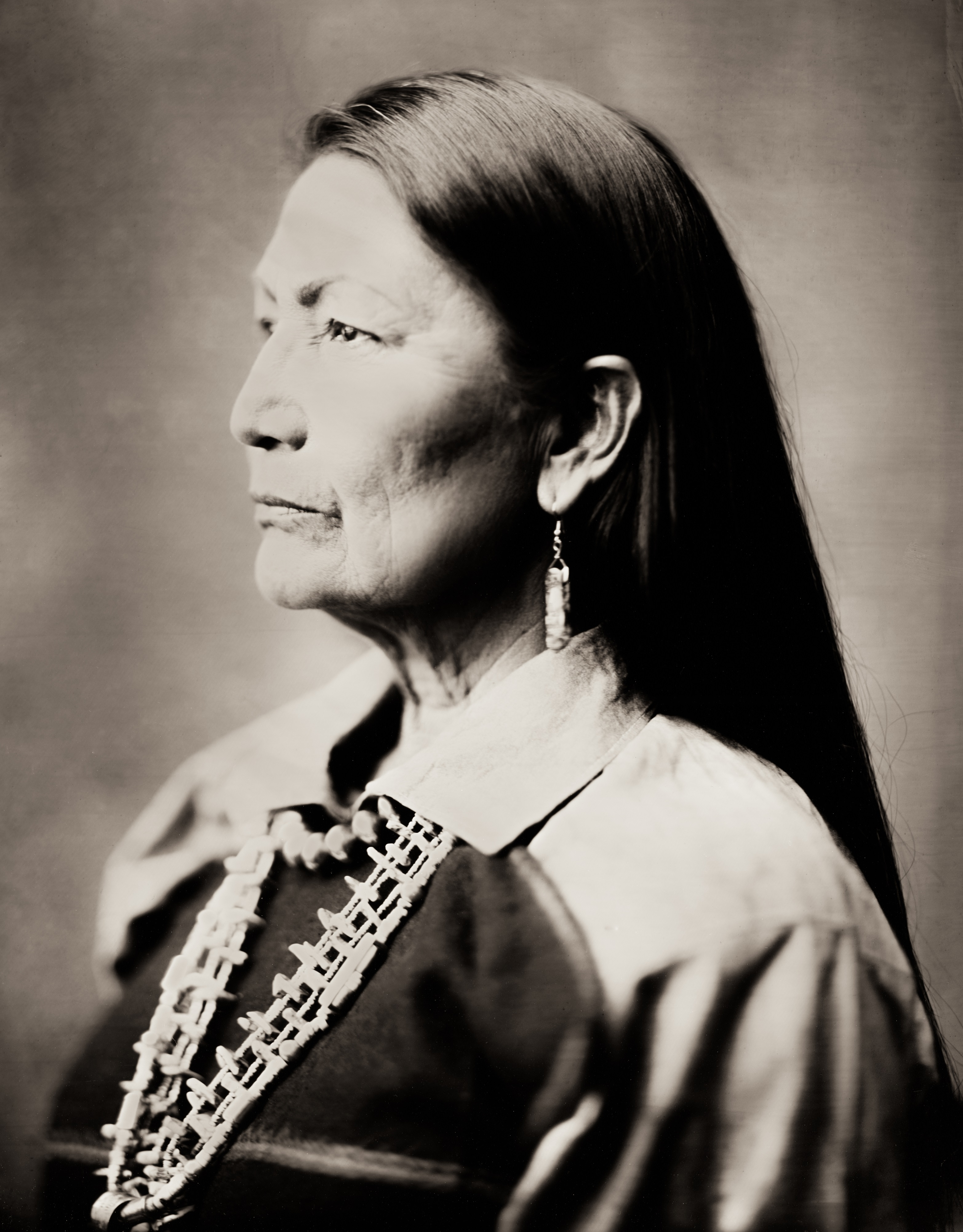
Collodion process portrait of Congresswoman Deb Haaland in 2019, by Shane Balkowitsch. Haaland was United States Secretary of the Interior between 2021–2025.

The wet plate collodion process has undergone a revival as a historical technique in the twenty-first century. There are several practicing ambrotypes and tintypes who regularly set up and make images, for example at Civil War re-enactments and arts festivals. Fine art photographers use the process and its handcrafted individuality for gallery showings and personal work. There are several makers of reproduction equipment, and many artists work with collodion around the globe. The process is taught in workshops around the world and several workbooks and manuals are in print. Modern collodion artists include:

- David Emitt Adams
- Shane Balkowitsch
- Nitrate Fox (Britt Bradley)
- Ben Cauchi
- James O'Connell
- Jill Enfield
- Jack Lowe
- Sally Mann
- Paul d'Orléans / Susan McLaughlin
- Craig Murphy
- Nadezda Nikolova
- Lindsey Ross
- Ian Ruther
- Collective Swiss Wetplate
- Khadija Saye
- Joni Sternbach
- Em White
- Matthew Schnittker

== Advantages ==
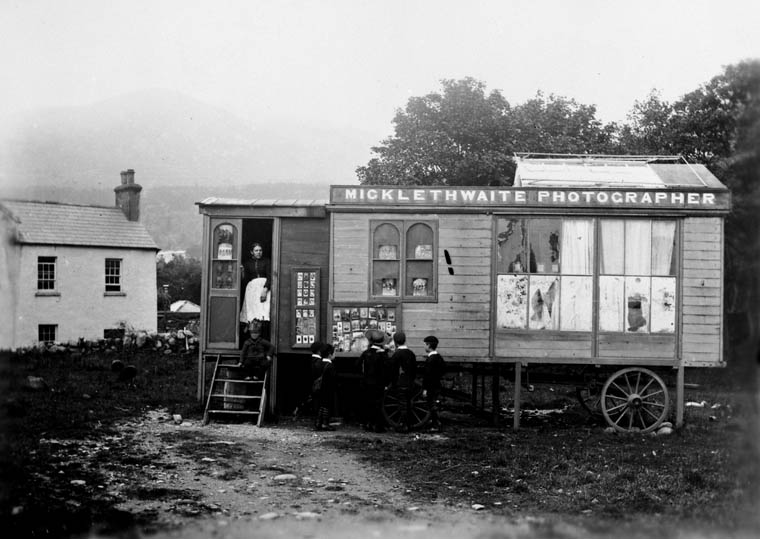
A portable photography studio in 19th-century Ireland. The wet collodion process sometimes gave rise to portable darkrooms, as photographic images needed to be developed while the plate was still wet.

Animation illustrating the detail found in a wet-collodion photograph taken in Hill End in 1872.

The collodion process produced a negative image on a transparent support (glass). This was an improvement over the calotype process, discovered by Henry Fox Talbot, which relied on paper negatives, and the daguerreotype, which produced a one-of-a-kind positive image and could not be replicated. The collodion process thus combined desirable qualities of the calotype process (enabling the photographer to make a theoretically unlimited number of prints from a single negative) and the daguerreotype (creating a sharpness and clarity that could not be achieved with paper negatives). Collodion printing was typically done on albumen paper.

As collodion is a sticky and transparent medium and can be soaked in a solution of silver nitrate while wet, it is ideal for coating stable surfaces such as glass or metal for photography. When a metal plate is coated with collodion, charged with silver nitrate, exposed, and developed, it produces a direct positive image on the plate, although laterally reversed (left and right would be reversed, like in a mirror). When coated on glass, the image becomes negative and can be reproduced easily on photographic paper. This was a huge advantage over the daguerreotype, which was not directly reproducible. Wet plate/collodion is also a relatively inexpensive process compared to its predecessor, and does not require polishing equipment or the extremely toxic fuming boxes needed for the daguerreotype. With glass as the medium, the cost per image was also far less than special silver-plated copper plates, and more durable than paper negatives. The process was also very fast for the time, requiring only a few seconds to expose an image in daylight, rather than 30 seconds or more for other forms of photography available in the mid-1800s.

== Disadvantages ==
The wet collodion process had a major disadvantage. The entire process, from coating to developing, had to be done before the plate dried. This gave the photographer no more than about 10-15 minutes to complete everything. This made it inconvenient for field use, as it required a portable darkroom. The plate dripped silver nitrate solution, causing stains and potentially explosive build-up of nitrate residue in the camera and plate holders.

The silver nitrate bath was also a source of problems. It gradually became saturated with alcohol, ether, iodide and bromide salts, dust, and various organic matter. It would lose effectiveness, causing plates to mysteriously fail to reproduce an image. The silver bath consequently needed to be "refurbished" by exposing to bright sunlight and filtering.

As with all preceding photographic processes, the wet-collodion process was sensitive only to blue and ultraviolet light. Warm colors appear dark, cool colors uniformly light. A sky with clouds is quite difficult to render, as the spectrum of white clouds contains about as much blue as the sky. Lemons and tomatoes appear shiny black, and a blue and white tablecloth appears plain white. Victorian sitters who in collodion photographs look as if they are in mourning might have been wearing bright yellow or pink.

== Use ==
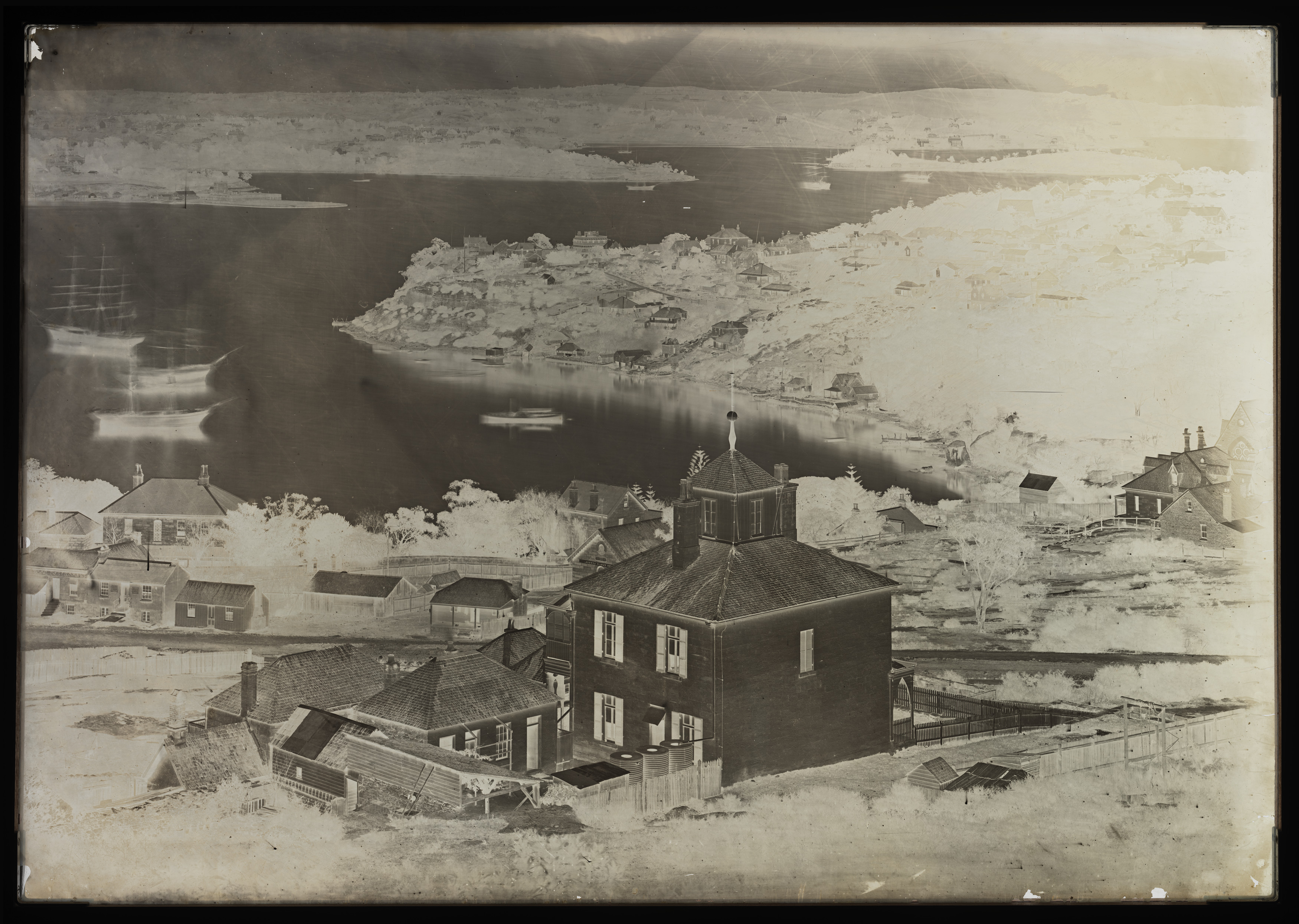
North Sydney and Sydney Harbour, by C Bayliss B Holtermann, 1875, colossal collodion glass-plate negative

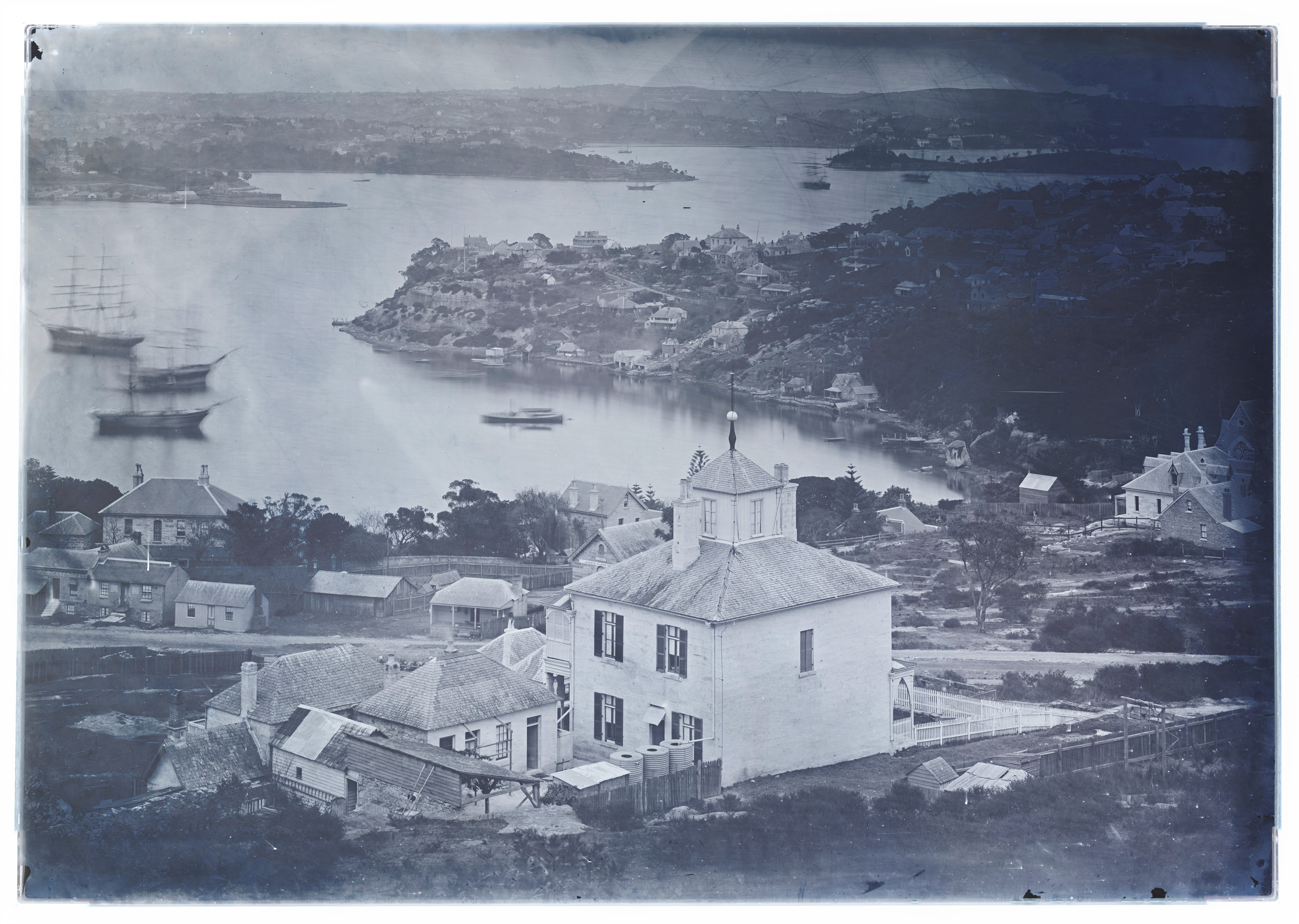
A positive of the same image

Despite its disadvantages, wet plate collodion became enormously popular. It was used for portraiture, landscape work, architectural photography, and art photography. The largest collodion glass plate negatives produced in the nineteenth century were made in Sydney, Australia, in 1875. They were made by the professional photographer Charles Bayliss with the help of a wealthy amateur photographer Bernhard Otto Holtermann, who also funded the project.

Bayliss and Holtermann produced four known glass negatives all of which were taken from Holtermann's purpose-built camera in the tower of his mansion in North Sydney. Two were 160 x 96.5 cm (5.1 ft x 3.08 ft) and formed a panorama of Sydney Harbour from Garden Island to Miller's Point. The other two were 136 x 95 cm (4.4 x 3.1 feet) and were of the Harbour and Garden Island and Longnose Point. Three of the four are now held by the State Library of New South Wales.

The wet plate process is used by a number of artists and experimenters who prefer its aesthetic qualities to those of the more modern gelatin silver process. World Wet Plate Day is staged annually in May for contemporary practitioners. Oskar Barnack Award winning photojournalist and contemporary collodion wet plate artist Charles Mason finds an artistic appeal in the uncertainty of the results of a wet plate photograph that cannot be recreated with modern digital photography. Mason says "If you plan it, then it becomes contrived, If you just let it happen, it's the gods helping you out." In 2018 Mason completed an artist-in-residency program with Denali National Park where he produced 24 collodion wet plate images of the park.

== Search for a dry collodion process ==
The extreme inconvenience of exposing wet collodion in the field led to many attempts to develop a dry collodion process, which could be exposed and developed sometime after coating. A large number of methods were tried, though none were ever found to be truly practical and consistent in operation. Well-known scientists such as Joseph Sidebotham, Richard Kennett, Major Russell, and Frederick Charles Luther Wratten attempted but never met with good results.

Typically, methods involved coating or mixing the collodion with a substance that prevented it from drying quickly. As long as the collodion remained at least partially wet, it retained some of its sensitivity. Common processes involved chemicals such as glycerin, magnesium nitrate, tannic acid and albumen. Others involved more unlikely substances, such as tea, coffee, honey, beer, and seemingly unending combinations thereof.

Many methods worked to an extent; they allowed the plate to be exposed hours, or even days, after coating. They all possessed the chief disadvantage, that they rendered the plate extremely slowly. An image could require anywhere from three to ten times more exposure on a dry plate than on a wet plate.

== Collodion emulsion ==
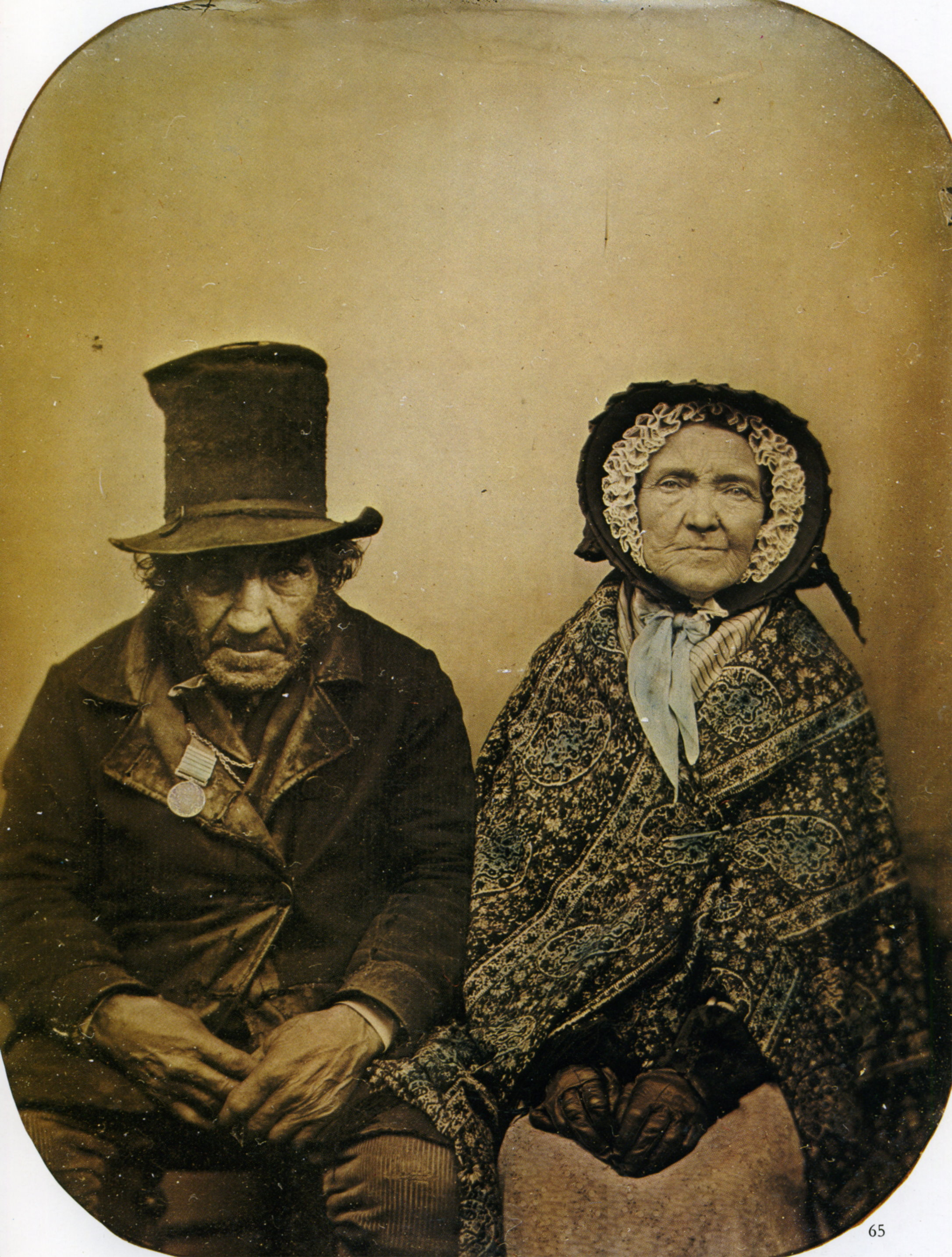
British veteran of the Napoleonic Wars with his wife, c. 1860, hand-tinted ambrotype using the bleached collodion positive process.

In 1864 W. B. Bolton and B. J. Sayce published an idea for a process that would revolutionize photography. They suggested that sensitive silver salts be formed in a liquid collodion, rather than being precipitated, in-situ, on the surface of a plate. A light-sensitive plate could then be prepared by simply flowing this emulsion across the surface of a glass plate; no silver nitrate bath was required.

This idea was soon brought to fruition. First, a printing emulsion was developed using silver chloride. These emulsions were slow, and could not be developed, so they were mostly used for positive printing. Shortly later, silver iodide and silver bromide emulsions were produced. These proved to be significantly faster, and the image could be brought out by development.

The emulsions also had the advantage that they could be washed. In the wet collodion process, silver nitrate reacted with a halide salt; potassium iodide, for example. This resulted in a double replacement reaction. The silver and iodine ions in the solution reacted, forming silver iodide on the collodion film. However, at the same time, potassium nitrate also formed, from the potassium ions in the iodide and the nitrate ions in the silver. This salt could not be removed in the wet process. However, with the emulsion process, it could be washed out after the creation of the emulsion.

The speed of the emulsion process was unremarkable. It was not as fast as the ordinary wet process, but was not nearly as slow as the dry plate processes. Its chief advantage was that each plate behaved the same way. Inconsistencies in the ordinary process were rare.

=== Pannotype ===
The pannotype (from Latin pannus = cloth) is a direct positive that, like the tintype, uses collodion emulsion from an underexposed image that is transferred to a dark surface so that transparent (unexposed) areas appear black and weak precipitated silver (highlights) appear brighter in reflected light, on the same principle as the daguerreotype and ambrotype. It was invented in 1852 by French photographer Jean Nicolas Truchelut, a pupil of Louis Daguerre and an itinerant daguerreotypist. Similar images on black waxed linen were displayed at the French Academy of Sciences by Wulff & Co. in 1853.

Various substrates were tried including wood, and Australian photographers Alfred R. Fenton and Frederick H. Coldrey patented a version on black leather in 1857 to create an unbreakable photograph that could be sent by mail. Various practitioners formulated, and some patented, their own recipes with the aim of good adhesion, but a disadvantage of using such supports was that flexing of the surface caused cracking and flaking of the emulsion so few historical examples survive. The process continued to be used until the 1880s but was being gradually displaced by the more durable tintype from the 1860s.

== Collodion emulsion preparation example ==
Below is an example of the preparation of a collodion emulsion, from the late 19th century. The language has been adapted to be more modern, and the units of measure have been converted to metric.

1. 4.9 grams of pyroxylin are dissolved in 81.3 ml of alcohol, and 148 ml of ether.
2. 13 grams of zinc bromide are dissolved in 29.6 ml of alcohol. Four or five drops of nitric acid are added. This is added to half the collodion made above.
3. 21.4 grams of silver nitrate are dissolved in 7.4 ml of water. 29.6 ml of alcohol are added. This is then poured into the other half of the collodion; the brominated collodion is dropped in, slowly, while stirring.
4. The result is an emulsion of silver bromide. It is left to ripen for 10 to 20 hours until it attains a creamy consistency. It may then be used or washed, as outlined below.
5. To wash, the emulsion is poured into a dish and the solvents are evaporated until the collodion becomes gelatinous. It is then washed with water, followed by washing in alcohol. After washing, it is redissolved in a mixture of ether and alcohol and is then ready for use.

Emulsions created in this manner could be used wet, but they were often coated on the plate and preserved in similar ways to the dry process. Collodion emulsion plates were developed in an alkaline developer, not unlike those in common use today. An example formula follows.

Part A: Pyrogallic acid 96 g, alcohol 1 oz.
Part B: Potassium bromide 12 g, distilled Water 30 ml
Part C: Ammonium carbonate 80 g water 30 ml

When needed for use, mix 0.37 ml of A, 2.72 ml of B, and 10.9 ml of C. Flow this over the plate until developed. If a dry plate is used, first wash the preservative off in running water.

== See also ==
- Albumen print
- Ambrotype
- August Semmendinger
- Calotype
- Collodion
- Daguerreotype
- Excelsior Wet Plate Camera
- Tintype
