= Craig Murphy =

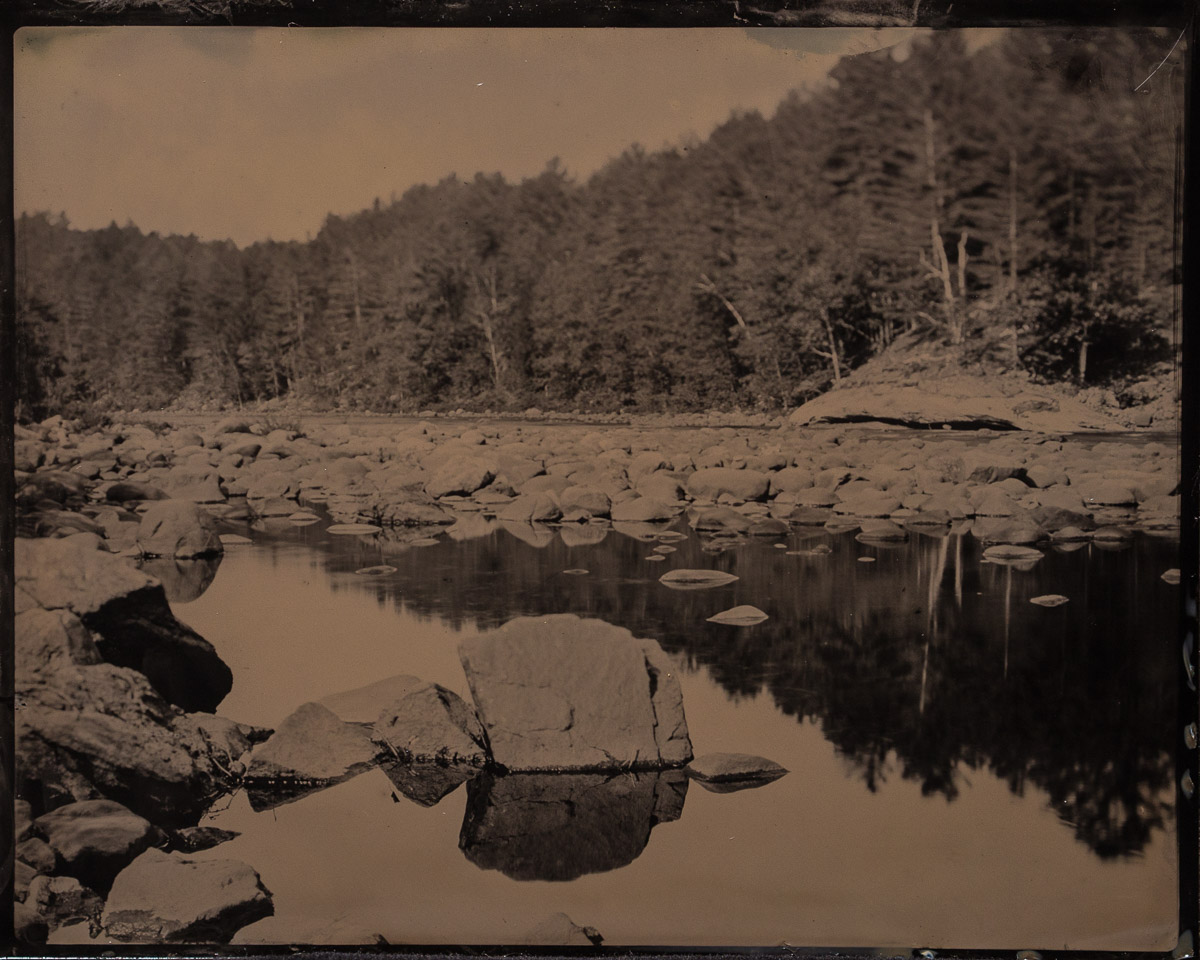
"Hudson River in the Adirondacks" by Murphy

Craig Murphy is an American fine-art photographer, specializing in the wet-plate collodion process.

== Career ==
Murphy travels with his mobile tintype studio in Upstate New York making ambrotype and tintype portrait and scenic images using the original 19th-century photographic process. He makes images of the Hudson River in the Adirondacks and of different New York State Erie Canal locks in Cohoes, Lockport, Palmyra and Waterford.

In addition, Murphy makes handcrafted reproduction Daguerreotype tintype cases.

== See also ==
- Frederick Scott Archer
