= Lindsey Ross =

American photographer

- Born: Lindsey Ross; 1981 (age 44–45); Columbus, Ohio
- Education: Brooks Institute of Photography (MFA, Photography); Denison University (BA, Religion)
- Known for: Collodion process photography; Alternative process photography
- Website: www.lindseyrossphoto.com

Lindsey Ross (born 1981) is an American fine-art photographer based in Santa Barbara, California, known for creating artwork using the time-intensive wet-plate collodion photographic process. Ross is known for creating ultra large format 32-by-24-inch images on metal (tintypes) and glass (ambrotypes) using one of three Chamonix view cameras that size in existence, keeping alive the collodion method invented in the 1850s.

== Life ==
Born in Columbus, Ohio, Ross was interested in photography from an early age, dressing up as a camera for Halloween at age eight and receiving her own Nikon FM as a gift from her father when she was ten. Ross attended Denison University where she received a Bachelor of Arts in Religion in 2003. After Denison, Ross worked on a cattle ranch in the Chilcotin of British Columbia before moving to Wyoming where she produced photos for a local news outlet. After five years, Ross attended the Brooks Institute where she completed a Master of Fine Arts in Photography.

== Work ==
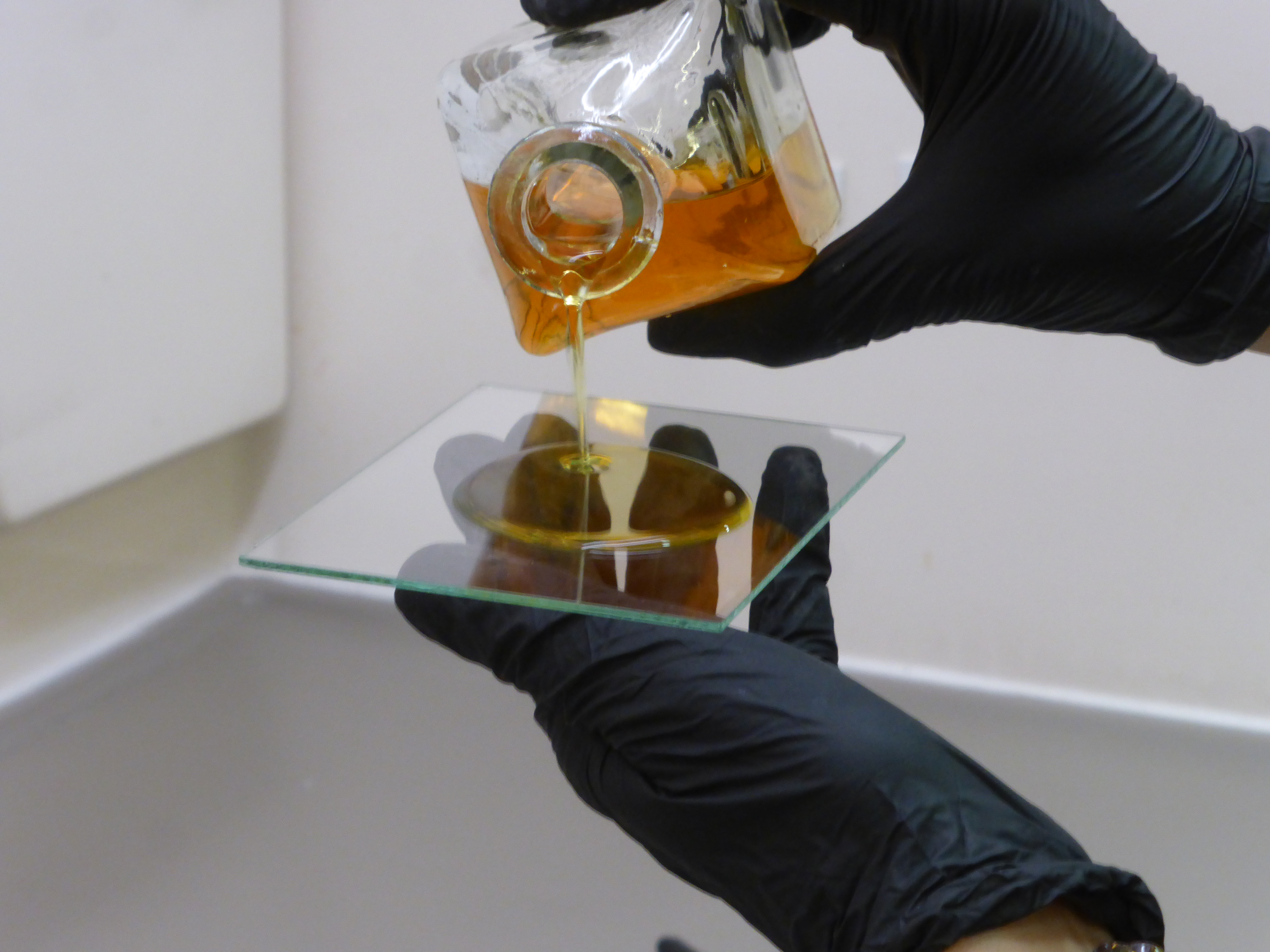
In the imaging method Ross is known for, liquid collodion is layered onto a photographic plate and then immersed in silver nitrate to create a negative.

After completing her MFA, Ross spent a year assisting for historical process expert Luther Gerlach before opening a photography studio and since then has been traveling the country with her large-format equipment, creating works using older processes. The collodion process Ross employs necessitates the use of a field darkroom when shooting on location and the gear that leaves her studio sometimes includes a 250 lb. camera, 25 lbs. of glass, a 50 lb. film holder, and a 90 lb. cart to move everything. Among the cameras she uses is a Levy process camera from the 1920s originally intended for high-fidelity graphic enlargement and reproduction work.

Ross' subject matter has included yucca plants in Joshua Tree, root vegetables, and snow-covered abandoned mines. Her work has been described as "emotive" and "ethereal"; her landscapes featuring multiple models have been described as "extravagant" and reminiscent of neoclassical paintings.

Ross has sometimes been commissioned to produce work and hold workshops for corporate clients, including Levi's, Red Bull, Universal, and Red Wing. A 2013 short film about her premiered at the Santa Barbara International Film Festival and a follow-up film was selected for the 2017 Banff Mountain Film Festival. In 2019 Ross presented her lecture on The Work of Art in the Age of Mechanical Reproduction by Walter Benjamin at the Robert Capa Contemporary Photography Center in Robert Capa's native Budapest.

== Exhibitions ==
Gallery exhibitions
Year	Title	Gallery	Location	Ref
2022	Mushroom People	Telluride Arts Gallery	Telluride, CO	
2022	Wet Plate: Reimagining Likeness and Landscape	Penumbra Foundation	Manhattan, NY	
2019	Gilded By Shadows	Brody Studios	Budapest, Hungary	
2019	Uncultivated	Budapest Art Factory	Budapest, Hungary	
2018	Juxtapose	The Arts Fund	Santa Barbara, CA	
2017	Fissure	La Chambre Photographique	Santa Barbara, CA	
2017	Ingress, egress, regress	Telluride Arts Gallery	Telluride, CO	
2016	Slow Hands Exhibition	SBCAST	Santa Barbara, CA	
2016	The Heroine’s Journey	Stronghouse Studios & Gallery	Telluride, CO	
2014	Faces of Summit County	Kimball Arts Center	Park City, UT	
2014	commence, connect, collaborate	Brooks Institute	Santa Barbara, CA	
2013	Tonalism Now	Sullivan Goss Gallery	Santa Barbara, CA	
2013	Valhalla	Valhalla Film Tour	Denver, CO	
2013	The Zone 2-D	The Arts Fund	Santa Barbara, CA	
2012	Elsewhere	Acero Gallery	Santa Barbara, CA	
2012	Fe	Acero Gallery	Santa Barbara, CA	
2011	MFA 7	Gallery 27	Santa Barbara, CA	
2011	The Factory Show	Tool Room Gallery	Ventura, CA	
2011	Art in the Age of Dialogue	Rastay	Islamabad, Pakistan	

== Filmography ==
- Schoneberger, Andrew (2017). Lindsey Ross: A Less Convenient Path. Lindsey Ross at Mountainfilm.
- Schoneberger, Andrew (2013). The Alchemistress.
