= Excelsior Wet Plate Camera =

Wet plate camera

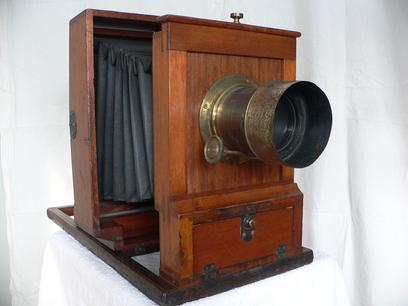
An Excelsior Wet Plate Camera in a private collection.

The Excelsior Wet Plate Camera is a type of wet plate camera invented by August Semmendinger, one of the first manufacturers of wet plate photography. Excelsior cameras were manufactured in both New York City and Fort Lee, New Jersey, starting in 1859.

== Overview ==
August Semmendinger began to manufacture cameras in 1859 in New York City at Nos. 410 & 412 West 16th Street under the business name "A. Semmendinger & Sons". He was one of the first major manufacturers of wet plate cameras, a type of photography that was discovered eight years prior in 1851 by Frederick Scott Archer and Gustave Le Gray. Using their new methods of photography, Semmendinger drew up plans for his own wet plate camera and branded it "Excelsior".

The Excelsior camera evolved over time to use novel features created by Semmendinger himself. The first, Patent No. 27,241, involved combining a spring board with a typical photographic apparatus "for the purpose of facilitating a rapid multiplication in photographing". This patent is an integral part of all known Excelsior cameras in existence today. Six months later another wet plate upgrade was patented under Patent No. 29,523, which expanded on the first aiding "in attaching the camera to a movable frame... for the purpose of facilitating the copying of large pictures by photographing."

After several years of camera production in New York City, the Semmendinger & Sons business moved across the river to Fort Lee, NJ. August Semmendinger died in 1885 leaving the business to his younger sons who continued the manufacturing of Excelsior wet plate cameras for some time.

Many Semmendinger cameras may be found in museums such as the George Eastman Museum, and the UCR/California Museum of Photography.

== Excelsior variations ==
Semmendinger cameras were most commonly single lens cameras under the model name Excelsior. All were made of finely polished mahogany with a cloth of rubber bellows and brass focusing screws. After Semmendinger's invention of the silver corners (Patent No. 145020), these were included in all future Excelsior model cameras. In addition to the common single lens variety, Semmendinger produced stereo cameras with combinations of either two or four lenses. All cameras produced by Semmendinger were part of the Excelsior brand, yet attempts have been made to distinguish between variations.

Variation 1 often refers to the Excelsior camera featuring a cone, or tapered, bellows. This camera also had a compartment on the front under the lenses where the brass screws used for focusing, securing, and moving the lens board would have been kept. Sizes for variation 1 varied from 6½x8½ inches to 17x20 inches. This model was also available to be made in a 5x8 inch stereoscopic size.

Variation 2 refers to the Excelsior without the tapered bellows. This camera also lacked the compartment under the lens, and was used more commonly as a studio or portrait camera. Sizes for variation 2 varied from 4¼x5½ inches to 20x24 inches.

Semmendinger's "Mammoth plate" wet-collodion camera saw use in remote landscape photography despite its weight and that of the glass plates it used. It was considered a "monster". Semmenndinger's idea of utilizing that portion of the camera just under the lens and converting it into a sort of cupboard was thought novel. One such Semmendinger "mammoth" is on display in the J. Paul Getty Museum in Los Angeles, California.
