= Hamilton Lanphere Smith =

American scientist, photographer and astronomer

Hamilton Lanphere Smith (November 5, 1819 – 1903) was an American scientist, photographer, and astronomer.

He was born in New London, Connecticut and graduated from Yale in 1839, where he constructed the largest telescope in the country at the time in 1838.

In 1848 Smith wrote The World, one of the first science textbooks written in America. Smith is best known for patenting the tintype photographic process, which popularized photography in America. He patented the great American tintype on February 19, 1856.

Between 1853 and 1868 he was Professor of Natural Philosophy and Astronomy at Kenyon College, Gambier, Ohio, and later taught at Hobart College in New York. He also created a system for describing microscopic algae that is still in use today. He published the exsiccata-like series Diatomacearum species typicae with glass-slides distributed
