= Shane Balkowitsch =

American photographer (born 1969)

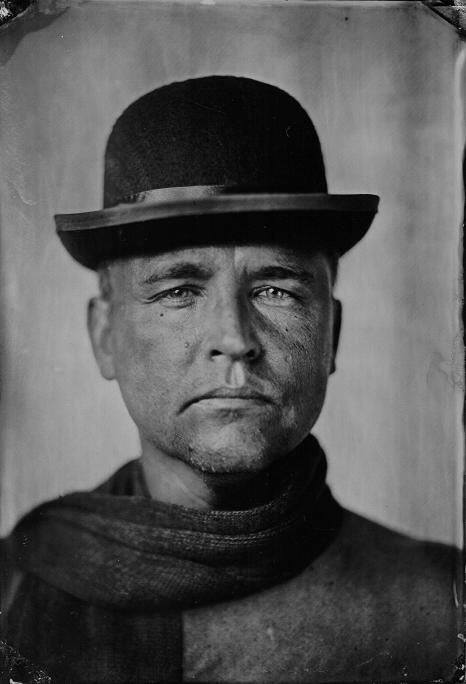
- Self Portrait, a wet plate collodion photograph of Balkowitsch.
- Born: January 24, 1969 (age 57); Bismarck, North Dakota
- Occupations: Wet plate photographer, and founder of Balkowitsch Enterprises
- Website: sharoncol.balkowitsch.com/wetplate.htm

Shane Balkowitsch (/ˈbɔːlkəwɪtʃ/ BAWL-kə-witch; born January 24, 1969) is an American wet plate photographer from Bismarck, North Dakota.

== Career ==
Prior to beginning his career as a photographer, Balkowitsch founded Balkowitsch Enterprises, Inc. in 1998. He retired and sold the company in June 2023.

In 2012, Balkowitsch began researching the process of wet plate photography after reading a manual on the subject by tintype photographer John Coffer. With little experience in photography, Balkowitsch experimented with the process and took his first successful photo the same year. He holds demonstrations in North Dakota with the use of a portable darkroom.

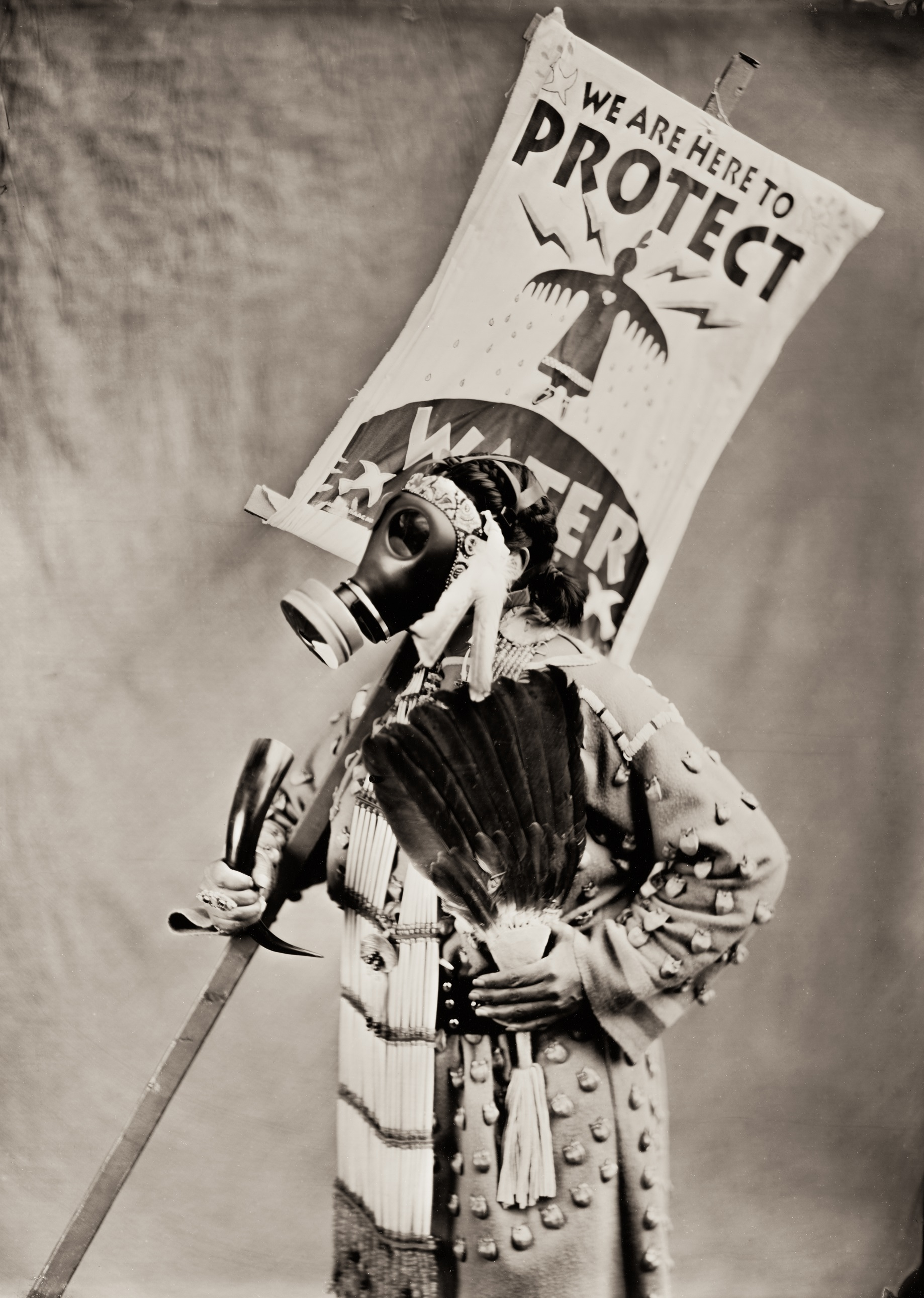
No Spiritual Surrender - Floris White Bull

In 2016 Balkowitsch's photograph of Evander Holyfield was acquired by the Smithsonian Institution and is now part of the National Portrait Gallery. The same year, Balkowitsch captured images of the encampment of the Dakota Access Pipeline protests. In 2019, No Spiritual Surrender, one of the photographs he took there, was awarded Best Photograph by the North Dakota Human Rights Art Festival.

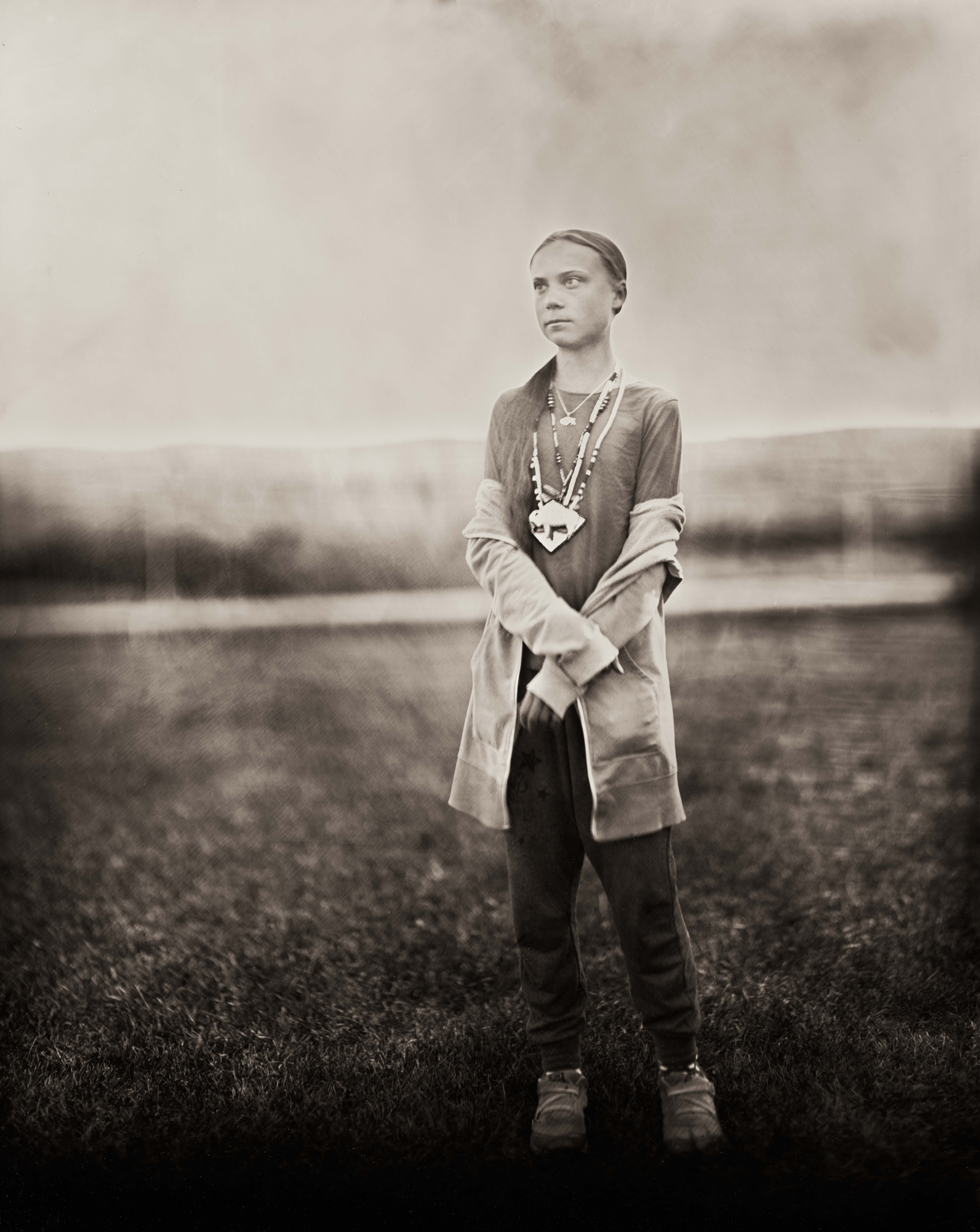
Greta Thunberg in Wet Plate Collodion by Shane Balkowitsch "Standing For Us All"

In 2019, a photo of Swedish climate activist Greta Thunberg created by Balkowitsch at the Standing Rock Indian Reservation in North Dakota was archived at the Library of Congress. and later was featured in National Geographic Magazine on October 28, 2020. The same year, the documentary film “Balkowitsch”, about Balkowitsch's life and work, debuted at the North Dakota Human Rights Film Festival.

== Greta Thunberg mural ==
In February 2020 a seven-foot mural of the work Standing For Us All by Balkowitsch was going to be displayed on the side of a bakery business in Bismarck, North Dakota. A Bismarck TV station reported on the planned mural and threats of vandalism and boycotts from the community followed. The mural Liberty Trudges Through Injustice by Balkowitsch and on display in Bismarck since the Spring of 2019 was vandalized on February 13, 2020. Standing For Us All is an image showing Swedish climate activist Greta Thunberg looking off into the distance taken by Balkowitsch during Thunberg's visit to Standing Rock Indian Reservation in October 2019. After plans to display the mural were cancelled in Bismarck, a former Fargo, North Dakota city commissioner spearheaded plans to bring the mural to the eastern North Dakota city. The mural of Thunberg will go on permanent display in downtown Fargo in March 2020.

== See also ==
- Albumen print
- Calotype
- Daguerreotype

== Books ==
- Northern Plains Native Americans: A Modern Wet Plate Perspective - Vol.1, Glitterati Incorporated, New York, NY, 2019, ISBN 978-1943876082
- Northern Plains Native Americans: A Modern Wet Plate Perspective - Vol.2, Nostalgic Glass Wet Plate Studio, Bismarck, ND, 2022, ISBN 978-1685244132
- Northern Plains Native Americans: A Modern Wet Plate Perspective - Vol.3, Nostalgic Glass Wet Plate Studio, Bismarck, ND, 2024, ISBN 978-1943876631
