= Adolphe-Alexandre Martin =

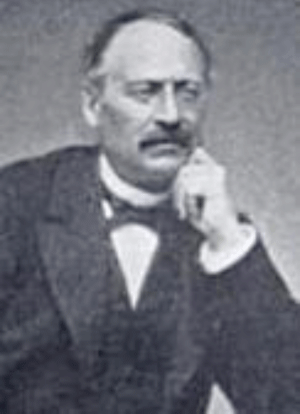
- Martin in 1860
- Born: 27 September 1824; Paris, France
- Died: 1896 (aged 71–72)
- Occupations: Photographer and ferrotype inventor

Adolphe-Alexandre Martin (Paris, September 27, 1824 – 1896) was a pioneer in photography and the inventor of the ferrotype in 1853. He was a professor of physics at the Santa Barbara College and a member of the French Photography Society from 1855 to 1896. He lived in Courseulles-sur-Mer and in Paris.

== Biography ==
Born in 1824 in Paris, Adolphe-Alexandre Martin developed a profound fascination for photography from a young age and became an amateur photographer. Later, while serving as a professor of physics and chemistry at the College Sainte-Barbe in Paris, Martin became a member of the committee of the Royal Photographic Society. Holding a doctorate in physics and chemistry, Martin conducted numerous laboratory experiments related to light, following in the footsteps of his mentor, Jean-Bernard-Léon Foucault. Professor Foucault gained international acclaim for demonstrating the Earth's rotation by dropping a pendulum from the dome of the Pantheon in Paris. Dr. Martin assisted Dr. Foucault in constructing the Great Telescope at the Paris Observatory.

During this period, Martin was also independently working on modifying the ambrotype photographic process, originally designed by the English photographer Frederick Scott Archer. In his variation of the wet collodion technique, Dr. Martin applied a transparent protective varnish over the negative, which he first applied to glass and then to a metal plate. Subsequently, he applied a colored varnish over the negative, which not only protected the image but also chemically converted it from negative to positive. This variation of the technique became known as the ferrotype (tintype).

On April 18, 1853, Adolphe-Alexandre Martin shared his exciting discovery in a paper sent to the French Academy of Sciences. In it, Dr. Martin explained that his original goal was not only to create a photographic image but also to assist engravers in their work when replacing artists' drawings. For this reason, initially, Martin was more inclined to use plates made of materials that were easier to engrave, such as wood, copper, steel, and not iron, which had become the preferred material for photographers. As the image would be destroyed after the engraving, Martin proposed that a second image be produced on glass so that the design could be reused in the future as a reference.

Dr. Martin quickly recognized the extensive possibilities of using the ferrotype technique. For example, images on glass plates were not easily transportable, whereas those composed on metal or cardboard were. The findings of his research were published in La Lumiere and received widespread attention worldwide. The versatile ferrotype invented by Martin became very popular for its ability to produce affordable, high-quality portraits, which allowed photography to move beyond studio confines and venture outdoors, especially during times of war. In fact, many of the portraits made during this era were created using the ferrotype technique.

In recognition of his contributions and efforts, Adolphe-Alexandre Martin was named a Knight of the Legion of Honor, France's most prestigious merit award, in 1870. Martin died in 1896, but his ferrotype technique continued to be used worldwide for much of the 20th century.

== Publications ==
- Determination of the Curvatures of the Large-Grained Objective for Views -"Determination des courbures de l'objectif grandanulair pour vues" (1892)
- On a Method of Direct Autocollimation of Astronomical Objects – "Sur une methode d'autocollimation directe des objectifs astronomique" (1881),

== See also ==
- Historia de la fotografía
- Ferrotipo
