= August Semmendinger =

American photography manufacturer

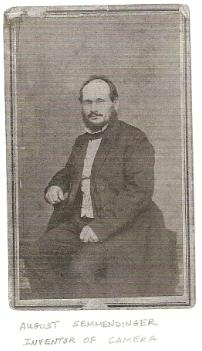
- August Semmendinger, c.1865
- Born: April 9, 1820
- Died: August 6, 1885 (aged 65); Fort Lee, New Jersey
- Citizenship: American
- Occupation: Photographic inventor

August Semmendinger (April 9, 1820 – August 6, 1885) was a manufacturer of photographic apparatuses and the inventor of the Excelsior Wet Plate Camera. Semmendinger first made his cameras in New York City. The second factory where he built his cameras was located in Fort Lee, New Jersey.

== Early life ==
August Semmendinger was born on April 9, 1820. Records indicate he emigrated to the United States from Bad Urach, Germany, arriving in the United States on July 6, 1849, aboard a ship named Columbia which had embarked from Bremen. Arriving with Semmendinger was his wife Magdalene, and his one-year-old daughter, Alwine.

After arriving in the United States, August lived in Lower Manhattan at 9 Elizabeth Street as a cabinetmaker. In 1855-6 he moved two blocks over to 40 Forsyth Street where his occupation is listed as a box maker. Shortly thereafter, August moved to 144 Elizabeth Street where he began to manufacture cameras.

== Career ==
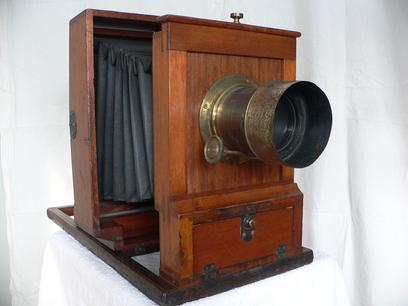
An Excelsior Wet Plate Camera made in Fort Lee, New Jersey.

Semmendinger began making cameras in 1859 and claimed to be the first to manufacture "photographic apparatus". Semmendinger made his cameras in New York City at this time at Nos. 410 & 412 West 16th Street.

Semmendinger was also an early camera designer, and was awarded three United States patents related to camera making. The first, Patent No. 27,241, was earned on February 21, 1860, for a "Photographic Apparatus" This invention was used to take successive exposures using the same wet plate. A second patent was secured on August 7, 1860, Patent No. 29,523, for an invention simply described as a "Camera."

By the early 1870s, Semmendinger moved his family and business to New Jersey and purchased land just across the Hudson River in Fort Lee. Here, Semmendinger was awarded his third United States Patent, No. 145,020, for Photographic Plate-Holders. This patent is for what Semmendinger titled his "Celebrated Silver Double Corners." Semmendinger's fourth patent was for "Camera-Stands", issued on March 31, 1874 (Patent No. 149,255).

In the summer of 1874, Semmendinger displayed his "photograph camera box" at the Fifth Cincinnati Industrial Exposition. He soon thereafter won a bronze medal at the 43rd exhibition of the American Institute of the City of New York for his "Elevated Camera Stand with double Swing Back Camera Box". He was later an exhibitor at the 1876 Centennial Exposition in Philadelphia where he displayed his "photograph apparatus". By 1882, his factory on Gerome Avenue (formerly Eickhoff or Ichoff Street) was a leading Fort Lee manufacturing industry employer.

Semmendinger's "Mammoth plate" wet-collodion camera saw use in remote landscape photography despite its weight and that of the glass plates it used. It was considered a "monster". Semmendinger's idea of utilizing that portion of the camera just under the lens and converting it into a sort of cupboard was thought novel.

== Family ==
Semmendinger married Magdalene Kinney (b.c. 1829) and together had eight children: Theodore, Alvina, Roland, Guido, Clara, Aloise, August, and Pythagoras.

== Death ==
August Semmendinger died in Fort Lee, New Jersey, on August 6, 1885. His sons carried on the photography business after his death.
