= Paul d'Orléans =

American motorcycle historian

- Born: Paul d'Orléans; 1962 (age 63–64)
- Occupations: Author, journalist
- Years active: 2006–present
- Known for: Motorcycle history
- Notable work: The Chopper; the Real Story

Paul d'Orléans (born 11 September 1962 in Stockton, California) is an American motorcycle historian, author and curator known for his expertise in motorcycle culture and history. He is the founder and editor of the website The Vintagent, an online resource for motorcycle history and culture. He is a frequent contributor to motorcycle publications and has authored several books on motorcycle history and culture. d'Orléans is a vocal advocate for the preservation of vintage motorcycles and is a recognized figure in the custom motorcycle scene. He was the co-founder of the Motorcycle Film Festival, an annual event that showcases films about motorcycles and motorcycle culture.

== Biography ==
Paul d'Orléans was born in 1962. He grew up in Stockton, California. He went to high school and then attended the University of California, Santa Cruz, where he studied fine art.

Paul began his professional life as a decorative painter. His interest in motorcycles led him to become a writer, journalist and historian specializing in motorcycle culture. In 2006, d'Orléans founded The Vintagent, a website dedicated to vintage and custom motorcycles. The Vintagent quickly became a popular online resource for motorcycle enthusiasts. The website features articles, historical information, photographs, and new films weekly.

He has also written for many motorcycle publications, including Cycle World (as a columnist and Custom & Style editor), Classic Bike Guide (as a monthly columnist), At Large magazine (as editor at large), Men's File and The Automobile. He has authored several books on motorcycles including The Chopper; the Real Story (2014 Gestalten), Ton Up! (2020 Motorbooks), "Custom Revolution" (2016 Petersen Automotive Museum), and Cafe Racers (2014 Motorbooks). He has also contributed significantly to and/or edited books including "The Ride" (2013 Gestalten), "The Ride: 2nd Gear" (2014 Gestalten), "The Current" (2018 Gestalten) based on The Current articles on electric vehicles in "The Vintagent", "The Riders: Motorcycle Adventurers, Cruisers, Outlaws, and Racers the World Over" (2021 Motorbooks), "10 Wheels & Waves" (2021 Super Special), etc.

In 2010, d'Orléans co-founded the Motorcycle Film Festival. He is known for his work to preserve motorcycle history and to promote vintage and custom motorcycles. He is regarded as an important person in the motorcycle community.

d'Orleans is a co-founder of the Motor/Cycle Arts Foundation (MC/AF), a non-profit organization dedicated to the preservation and promotion of motorcycle arts and culture. The foundation works to document and celebrate motorcycle history through various mediums including film, photography, and literature. Through the MC/AF, d'Orleans has helped organize exhibitions, cultural events, and educational programs that explore the intersection of motorcycles with art, society, and technology. The foundation also works to preserve important artifacts and documents related to motorcycle culture and history.

== Exhibits and Events ==
Paul d'Orléans has received recognition for his contributions to motorcycle culture. He was invited to be the guest curator at the Petersen Automotive Museum. and curated 5 exhibits there, including "Custom Revolution", "Electric Revolution", "Silver Shotgun", "ADV:Overland", and "Electric Revolutionaries". Previous to his association with the Petersen Museum, Paul curated exhibits at the National Motorcycle Museum ("History of the Chopper"), and at the Michael Lichter Gallery in Sturgis ("Ton Up" and "The Naked Truth").

He has also served as the emcee and judge for the Quail Motorcycle Gathering (since 2010) and as a judge at the Concorso d'Eleganza Villa d'Este (2011–2019). He has also provided live commentary at motorcycle auctions for Bonhams and Mecum Auctions, which has included television appearances on NBCSN and MotorTrend TV. He has also been interviewed on NPR for his research on Cliff Vaughs and the choppers used in the film Easy Rider.

Paul has appeared in numerous films and videos, and as a guest on many podcasts (Adventure Rider, Rider Magazine, Slow Baja, Before IT Happened, Horsepower Heritage, Fellows Ride, etc.).
