= Tintype =

Photographic process; direct positive image on metal

Tintype of two girls in front of a painted background of the Cliff House and Seal Rocks in San Francisco, c. 1900

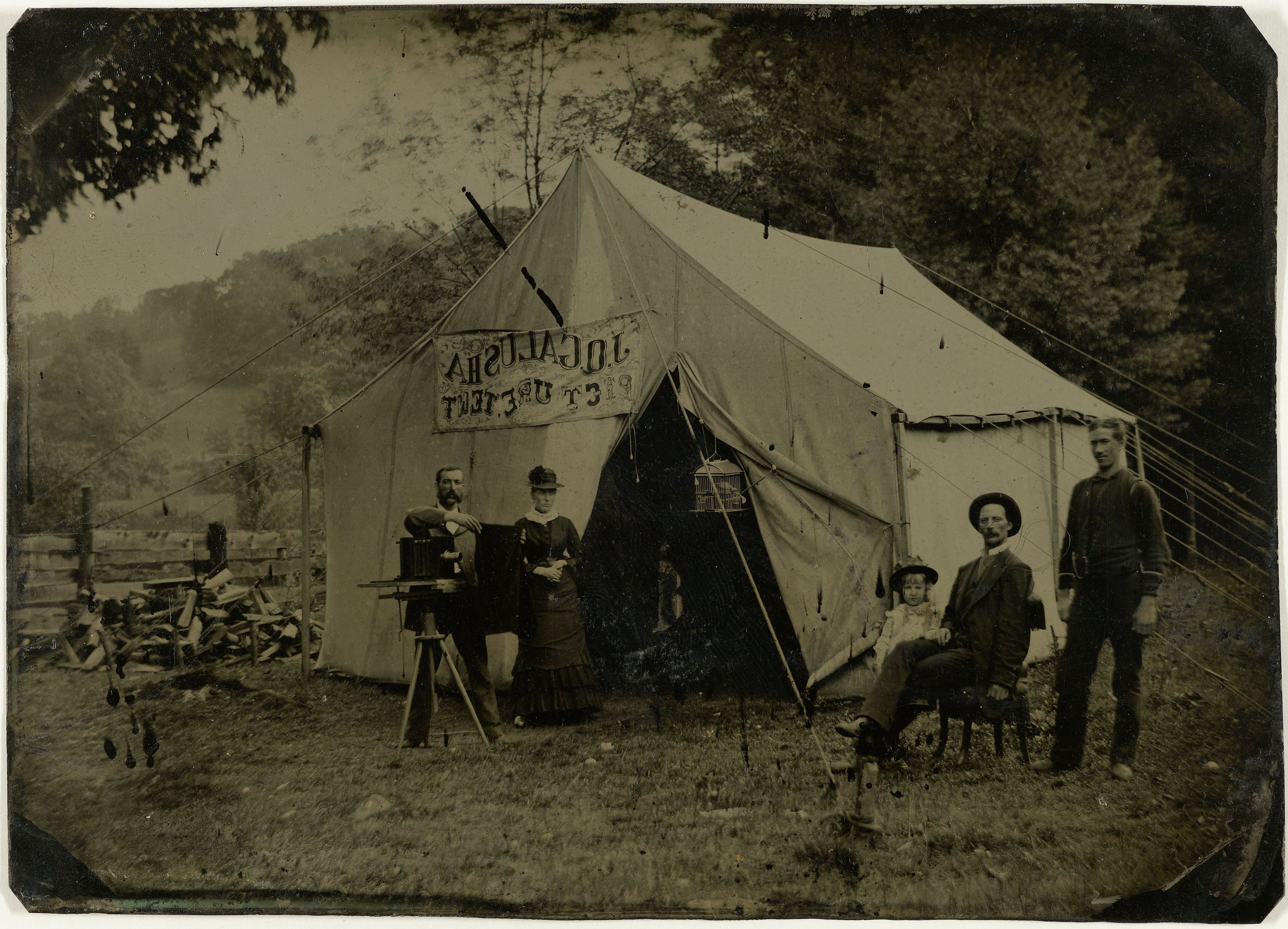
Studio tent of ferrotypist J. Q. Galusha, 12,7 × 17,7 cm, USA, c. 1880–1900

A tintype, also known as a melanotype or ferrotype, is a photograph made by creating a direct positive on a thin sheet of metal, colloquially called 'tin' (though not actually tin-coated), coated with a dark lacquer or enamel and used as the support for the photographic emulsion. It was introduced in 1853 by Adolphe Alexandre Martin in Paris. It competed with both the ambrotype process and the older and established daguerreotype, finding particular adoption in North America. Tintypes enjoyed their widest use during the 1860s and 1870s, but lesser use of the medium persisted into 1930s and it has been revived as a novelty and fine art form in the 21st century. It has been described as the first "truly democratic" medium for mass portraiture.

Tintypes were particularly used for portraits. They were at first usually made in a formal photographic studio, like daguerreotypes and other early types of photographs. The specific terms ferrotype and, correspondingly, ferrotypist were used at the time, however, rather than the more generic photographer. Later on tintypes were most commonly made by ferrotypists working in booths, tents, or the open air at fairs and carnivals, as well as by itinerant sidewalk photographers.

As the lacquered iron support of ferrotypes was resilient, and did not need later drying, a tintype could be developed, fixed, and handed to the customer only a few minutes after the picture had been taken.

The tintype saw the American Civil War come and go, documenting the individual soldier and horrific battle scenes. It captured scenes from the Wild West as it was easy to produce by itinerant photographers working out of covered wagons. They captured farming families in front of their new home (house portraits), emerging towns as well as the frontier landscape, for which large plates were used.

It began losing artistic and commercial ground to higher quality albumen prints on paper in the mid-1860s, yet survived for well over another half century, living mostly as a carnival novelty. The tintype's immediate predecessor, the ambrotype, was done by the same process of using a sheet of glass as the support. The glass was either of a dark color or provided with a black backing so that, as with a tintype, the underexposed negative image in the emulsion appeared as a positive. Tintypes were sturdy and did not require mounting in a protective hard case like ambrotypes and daguerreotypes.

== Technical details ==
Tintype portrait in a paper mat, taken at Pease's Nantasket Tintype Gallery, circa 1900

There are two historic tintype processes: wet and dry. In the wet process, a collodion emulsion containing suspended silver halide crystals has to be formed on the plate just before it is exposed in the camera while still wet. Chemical treatment then reduces the crystals to microscopic particles of metallic silver in proportion to the intensity and duration of their exposure to light, resulting in a visible positive image. The later prefabricated, hence more convenient dry process is similar but uses a gelatin emulsion which can be exposed in the camera dry.

In both processes, a very underexposed negative image is produced in the emulsion. Its densest areas, corresponding to the lightest parts of the subject, appears gray by reflected light. The areas with the least amount of silver, corresponding to the darkest areas of the subject, are essentially transparent and appear black when seen against the dark background provided by the lacquer. The image as a whole therefore appears to be a dull-toned positive. This ability to employ underexposed images allows shorter exposure times to be used, a great advantage in portraiture.

To obtain as light-toned an image as possible, potassium cyanide was normally employed as the photographic fixer. It was perhaps the most acutely hazardous of all the several highly toxic chemicals originally used in this and many other early photographic processes.

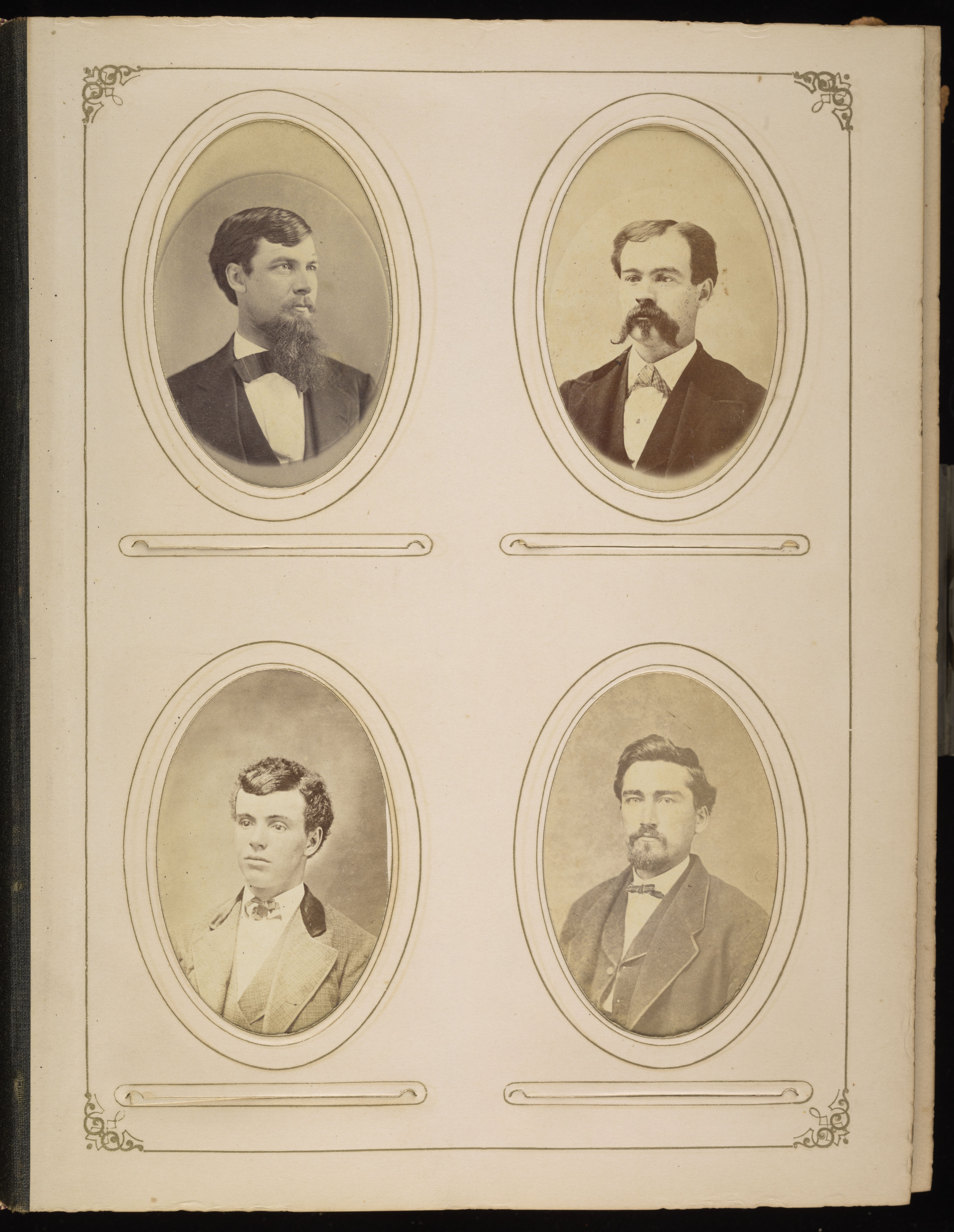
Tintype portraits in an album, circa late 1800s-early 1900s

To overcome the uniqueness of each picture, multi-lensed cameras and single-lens cameras with a movable back holding the plate were invented. Three men from Boston are to name here. John Roberts first made use of multiple lenses, mounting as many as 32 of them on one camera. A twelve-lensed camera for example, developed in 1858, made a dozen 3/4-by-1-inch (19 mm × 25 mm) so-called "gem" portraits with one exposure. A patent for a movable plate holder was registered by Albert S. Southworth in 1855. In 1860 both methods were combined in patents by Simon Wing, who promoted these cameras successfully and tried to enforce licensing, but failed with the Supreme Court ruling his patents invalid due to their use prior to his patents. Portrait sizes ranged from gem-size to 11 in × 14 in (280 mm × 360 mm). From about 1865 to 1910, the most popular size, called "Bon-ton", ranged from 2 3/8 in × 3 1/2 in (60 mm × 89 mm) to 4 in × 5 3/4 in (100 mm × 150 mm).

Each tintype is usually a camera original, so the image is usually a mirror image, reversed left to right from reality. Sometimes the camera was fitted with a mirror or right-angle prism so that the result would be right-reading.

== History ==
The process was first described by Adolphe-Alexandre Martin in France in 1853. In 1856 it was patented by Hamilton Smith in the United States and by William Kloen in the United Kingdom. It was first called melainotype, then ferrotype by V. M. Griswold of Ohio, a rival manufacturer of the iron plates, then finally tintype.

=== Ambrotype as a precursor ===
The ambrotype was the first use of the wet-plate collodion process as a positive image. Such collodion glass positives had been invented by Frederick Scott Archer in 1851. Although it is a widely held belief James Ambrose Cutting might have named the process after himself, in actuality, "ambrotype" was first coined by Marcus Aurelius Root, a well known daguerreotypist, in his gallery as documented in the 1864 book The Camera and the Pencil.

The tintype was essentially a variant of the ambrotype, replacing the latter's glass plate with a thin sheet of japanned iron (hence ferro). Ambrotypes often exhibit some flaking of their black back coating, cracking or detachment of the image-bearing emulsion layer, or other deterioration, but the image layer on a tintype has proven to be typically very durable, although the iron support might oxidize at its corners.

=== Success of the tintype ===
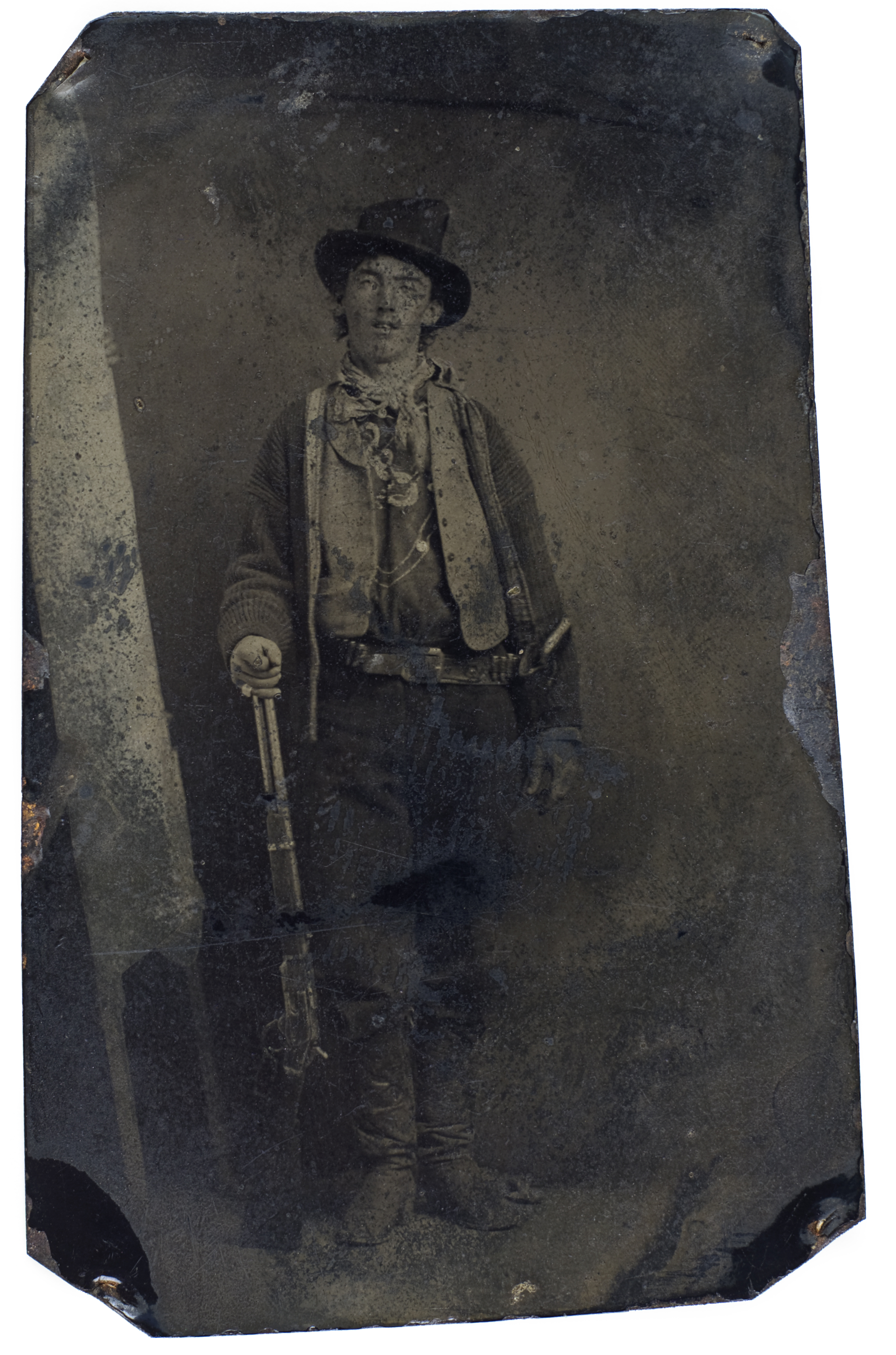
The only surviving portrait of Billy the Kid, Fort Sumner, c. 1879–80

Compared to their most important predecessor, the daguerreotype, tintypes were not only very inexpensive, they were also relatively easy and quick to make. A photographer could prepare, expose, develop and varnish a tintype plate and have it ready for the customer in a few minutes. Although early tintypes were sometimes mounted in protective ornamental cases, like daguerreotypes and ambrotypes, uncased tintypes in simple paper mats were popular from the beginning. They were often transferred into the precut openings provided in book-like photograph albums like the later prints on cardboard.

One or more hardy, lightweight, thin tintypes could be carried conveniently in a jacket pocket. They became very popular in the United States during the American Civil War. Although prints on paper (see cartes de visite and cabinet cards) soon displaced them as the most common type of photograph, the tintype process continued to enjoy considerable use throughout the 19th century and beyond, especially for casual portraiture by novelty and street photographers. In contrast to the considerable amount of manuals, books and articles in journals on the different photographic processes, they were seldomly treating the ferrotype. Whereas Edward M. Estabrooke stated in his almost unique extensive monograph The Ferrotype and How to Make It, published in 1872, that the amount of ferrotypes taken would probably surmount the production of all other techniques combined. His book and the introduction of low cost variants known as "Gem ferrotypes" and the invention of the photo booth in 1888, helped to sustain the tintype's longevity.

=== Contemporary usage ===
John Coffer, as profiled in a 2006 New York Times article, travels by horse-drawn wagon creating tintypes.

In 2013, California Air National Guard member and artist Ed Drew took the first tintypes in a war zone since the Civil War, when he photographed Air Force pilots serving in the Afghan War.

The contemporary photographer Victoria Will created a series of tintypes of Hollywood stars at the 2014 and 2015 Sundance Film Festivals, including portraits of Anne Hathaway, Nick Cave, and Ewan McGregor. The portraits were later published as a book.

Organisations such as Penumbra Foundation continue to use this technique, offering tintype photography sessions. Their work has been featured in the New York Times.

== Gallery ==
Different utilizations and genres of ferrotype and their settings, arranged chronologically.

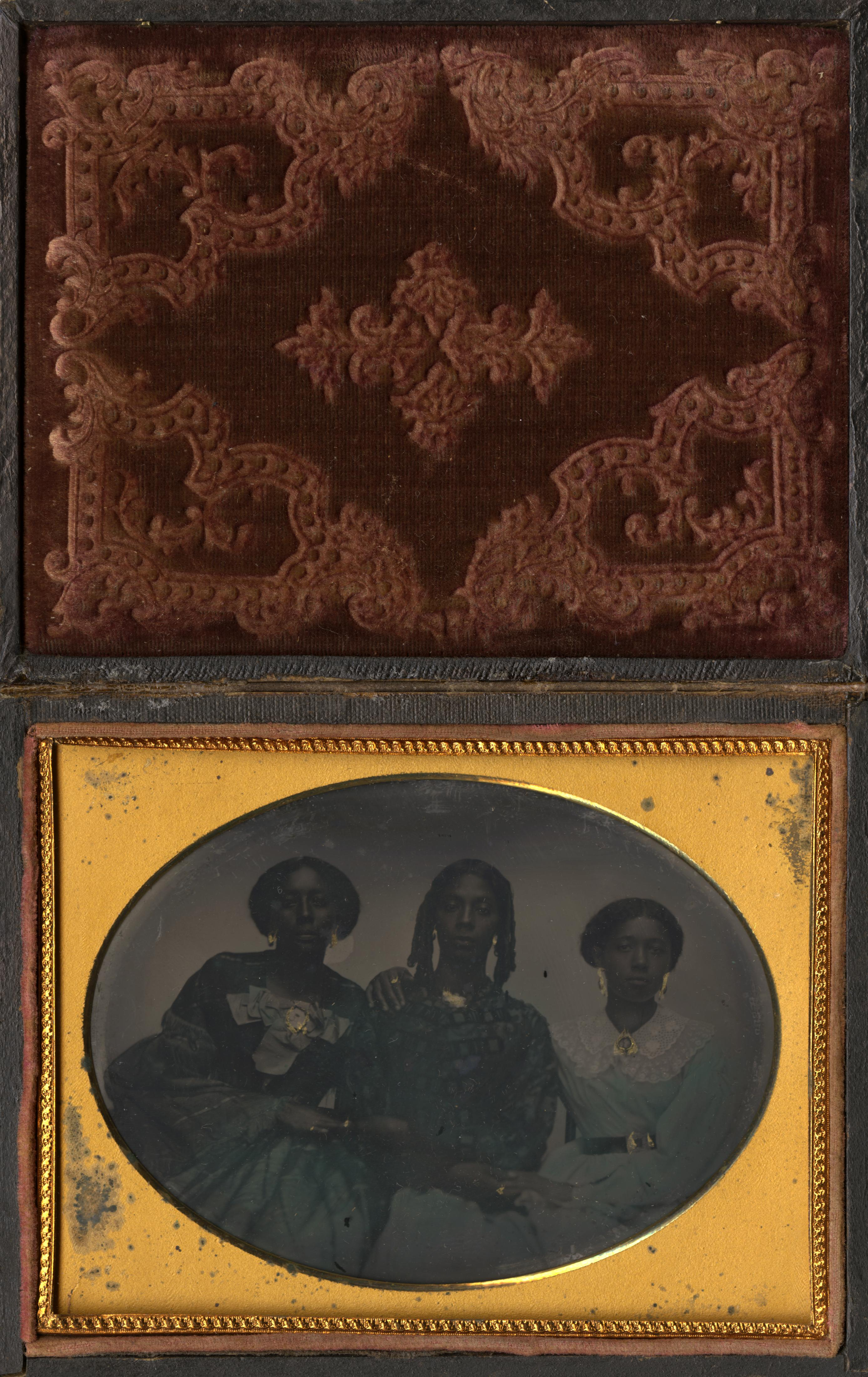
Formal portrait of three African American women in formal dress with hands clasped together, tinted and with gilded jewelry, studio-ferrotype in typical casing, c. 1856

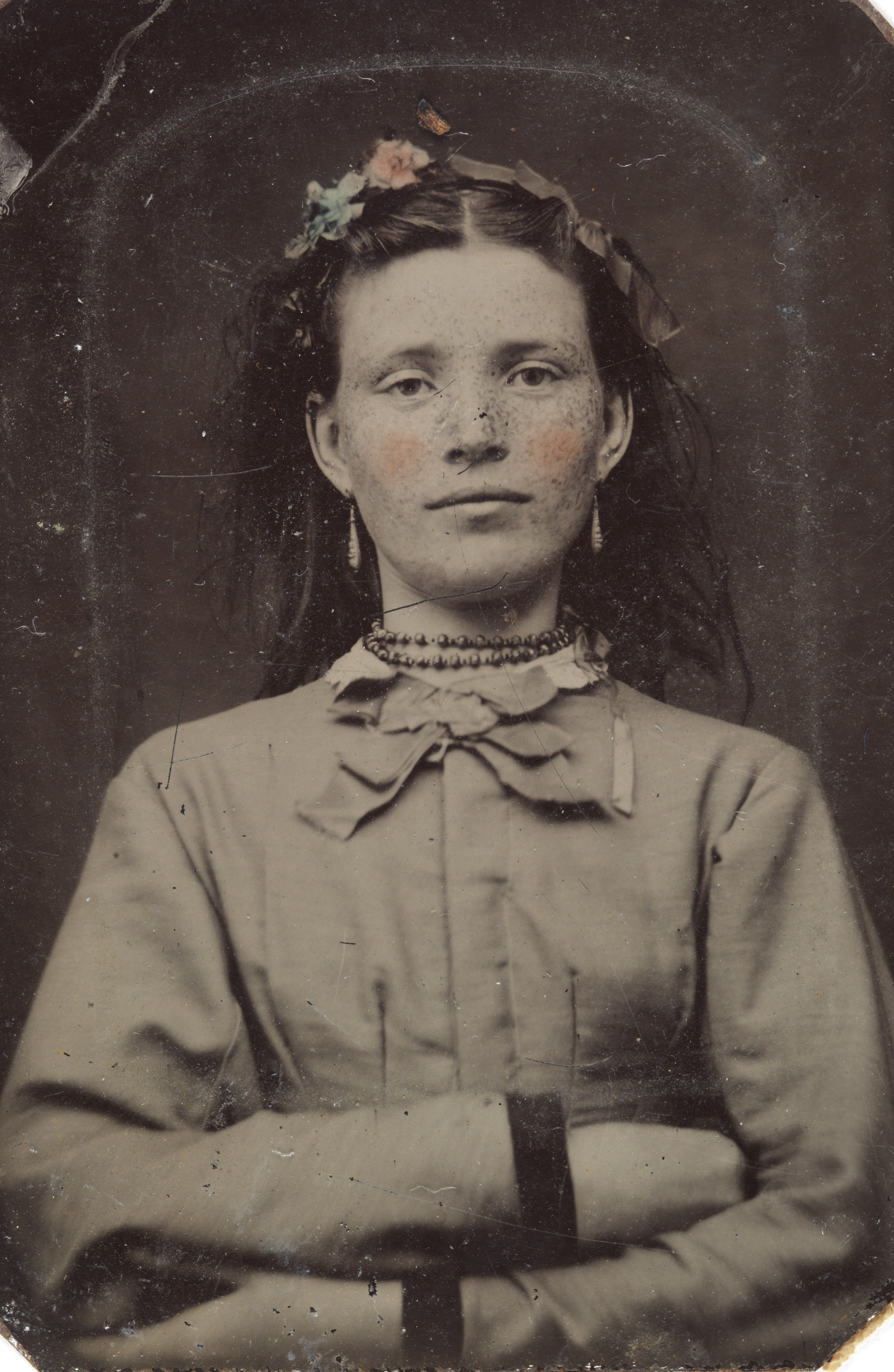
Portrait of a young Norwegian woman in the US, partly tinted, c. 1856–1900

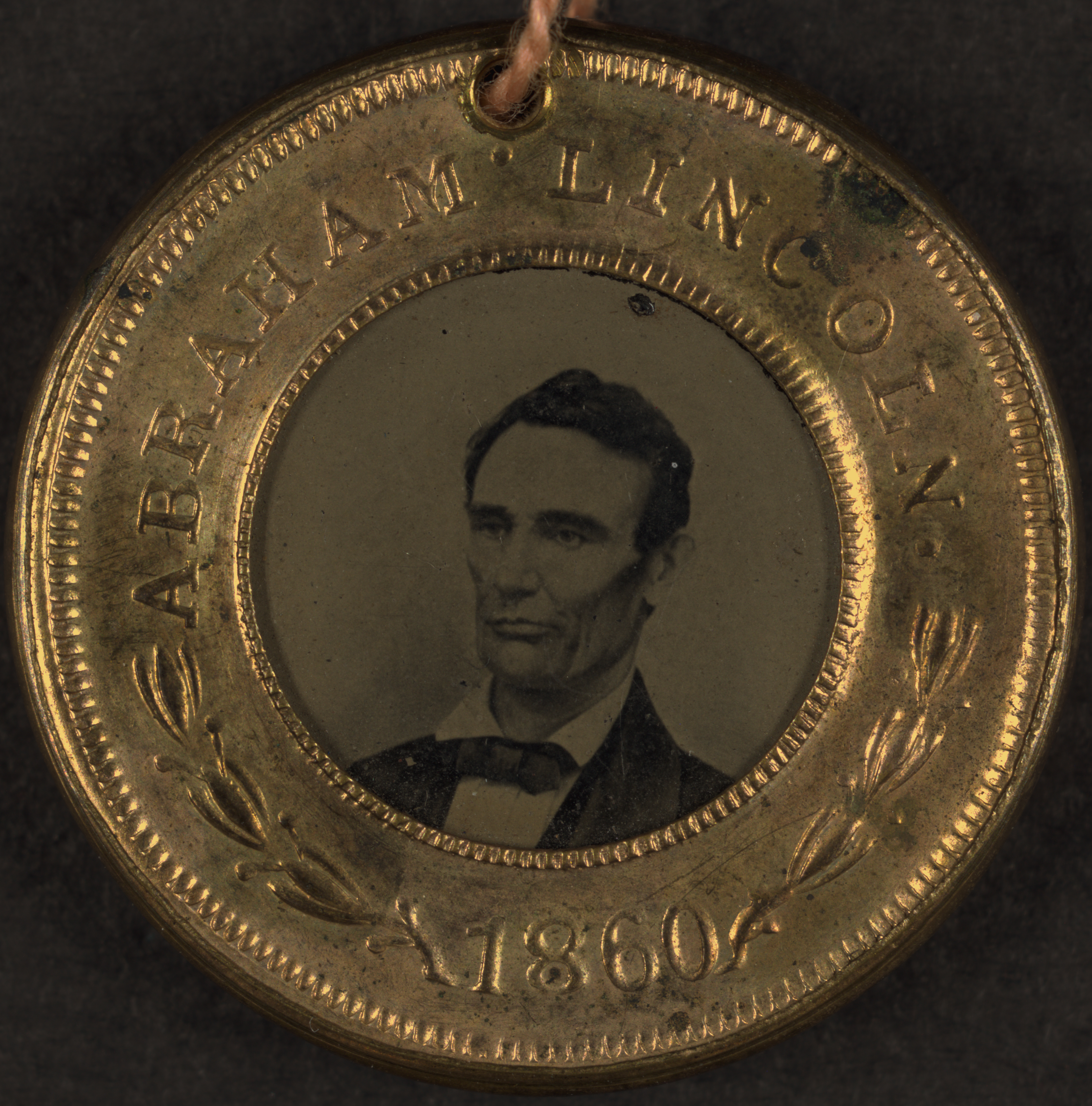
Campaign button for Abraham Lincoln, 1860, on flip side his vice presidential running mate Hannibal Hamlin

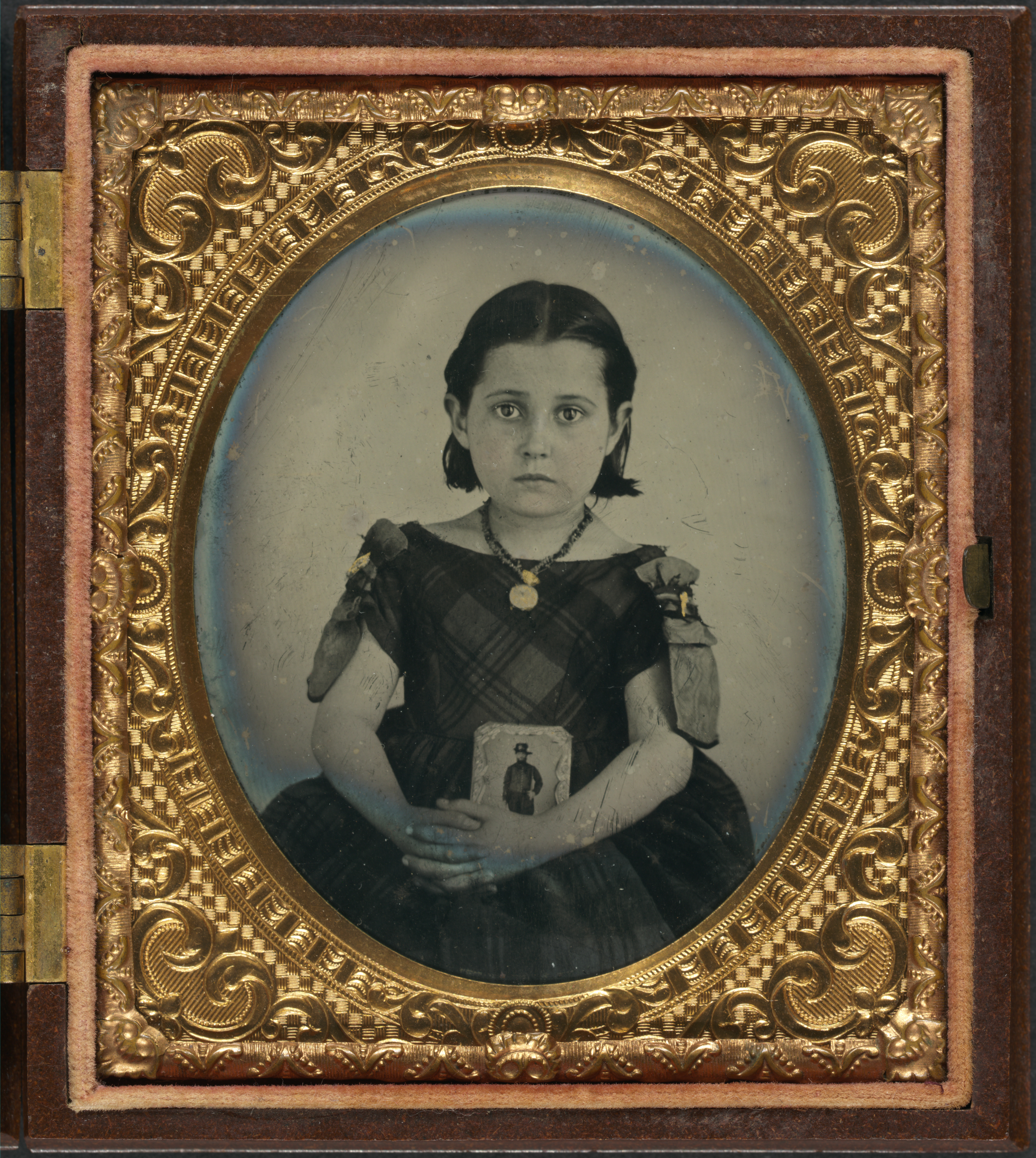
Girl in mourning dress holding framed photograph of her father, USA, encased, c. 1861–1870

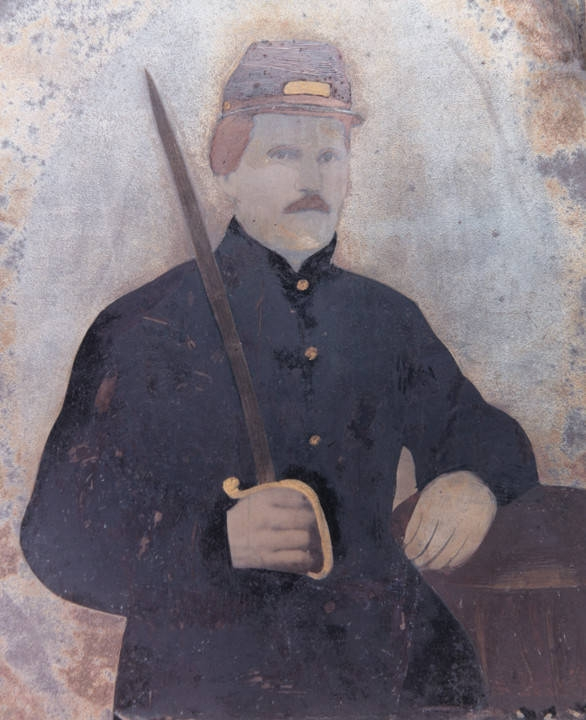
Painted tintype of Samuel Spencer Ives, a colonel of the 35th Alabama Infantry, C.S.A., 12 January 1862 (Alabama Department of Archives and History)

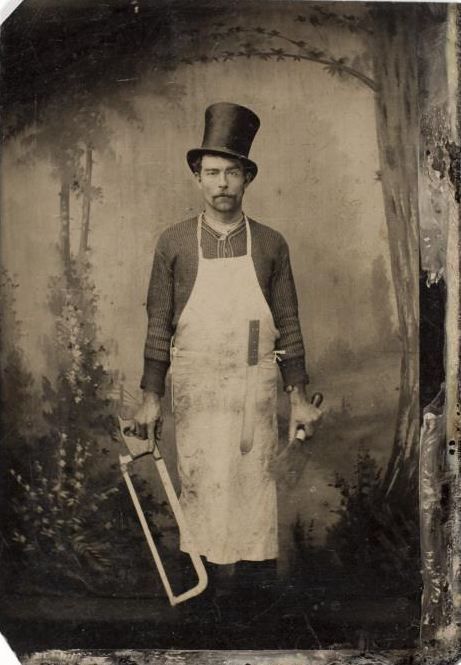
Butcher with his tools, c. 1875

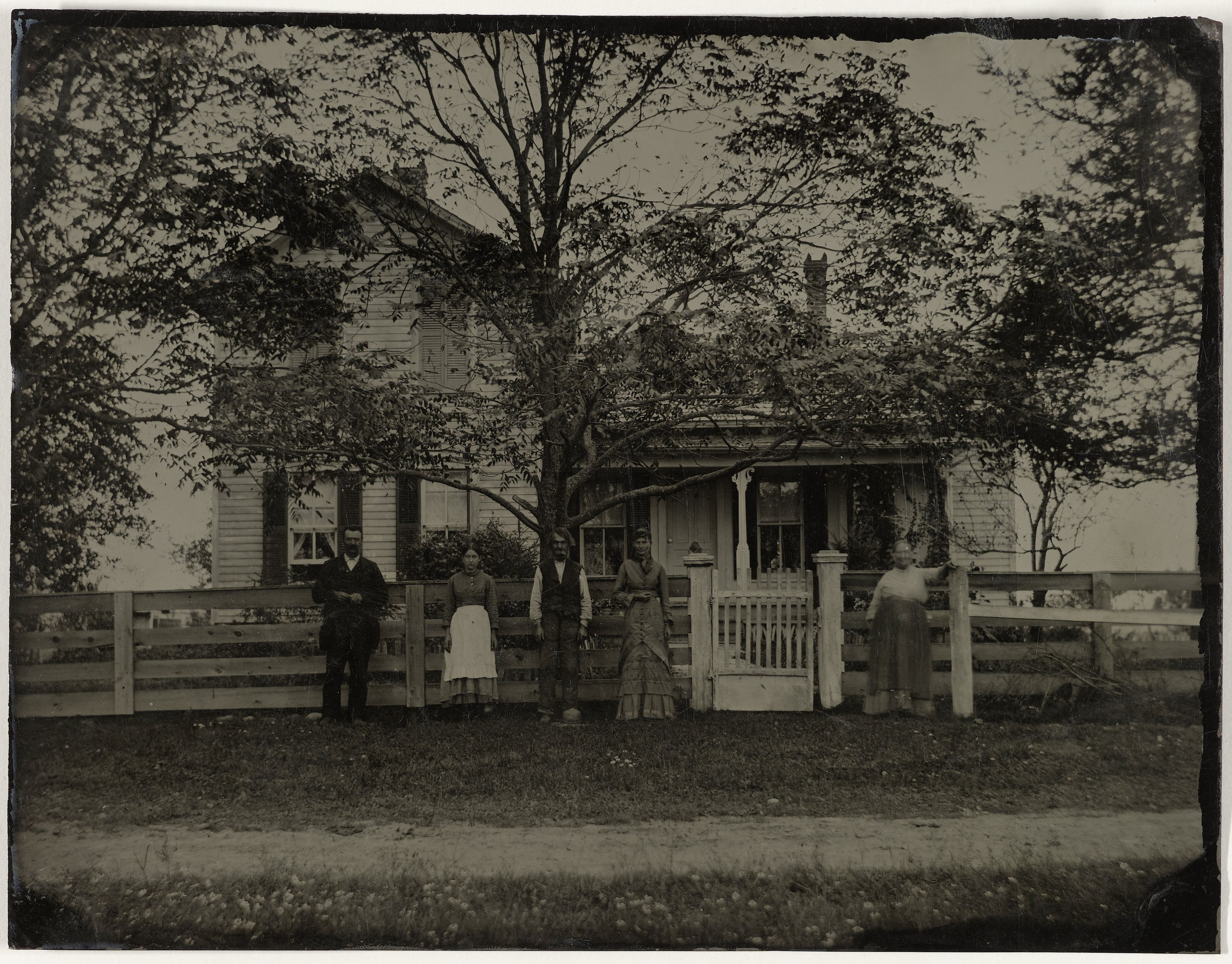
A house portrait, 16 × 21 cm, 1860–1900

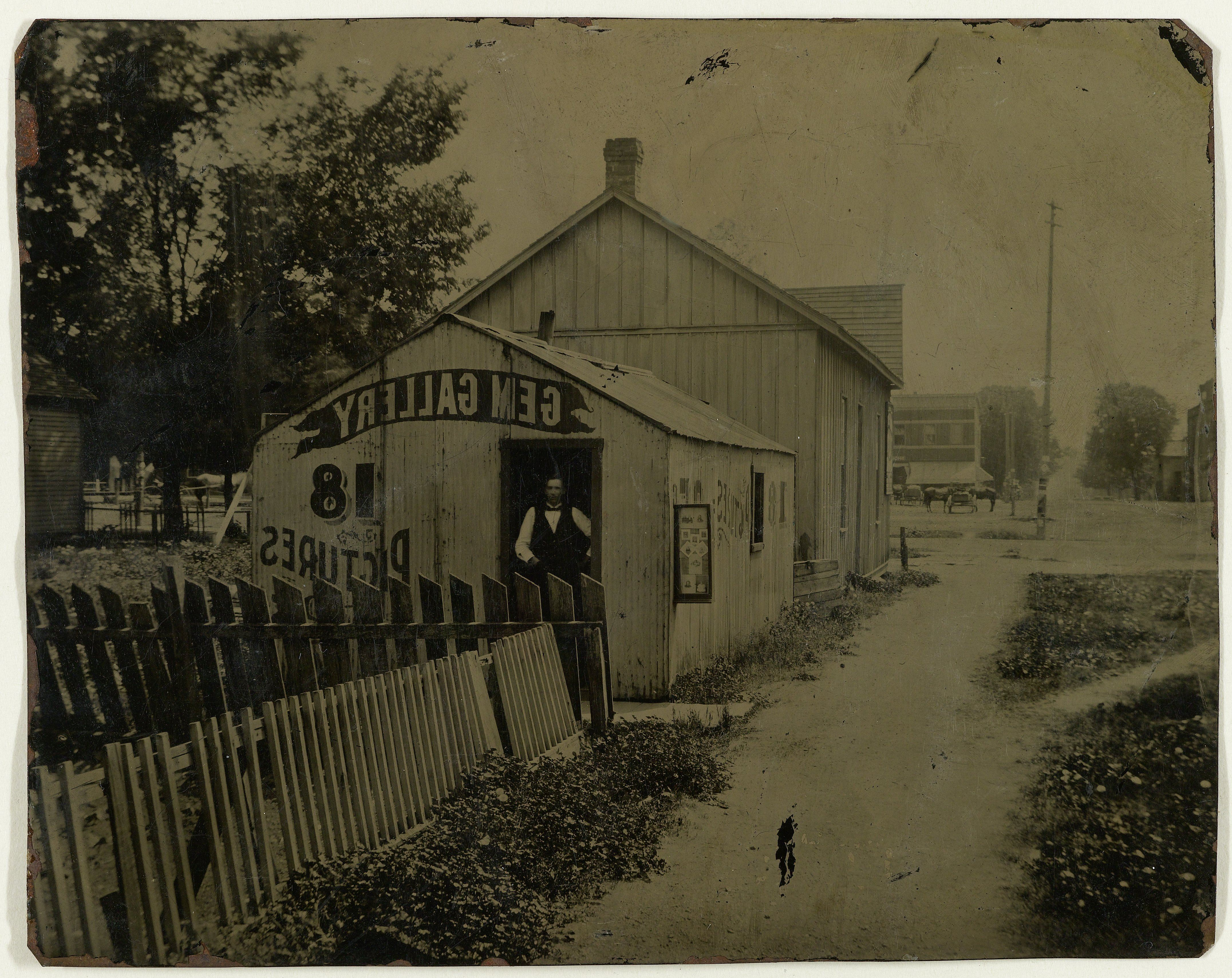
Studio of a ferrotypist, 9,2 × 11 cm, USA, c. 1880–1900

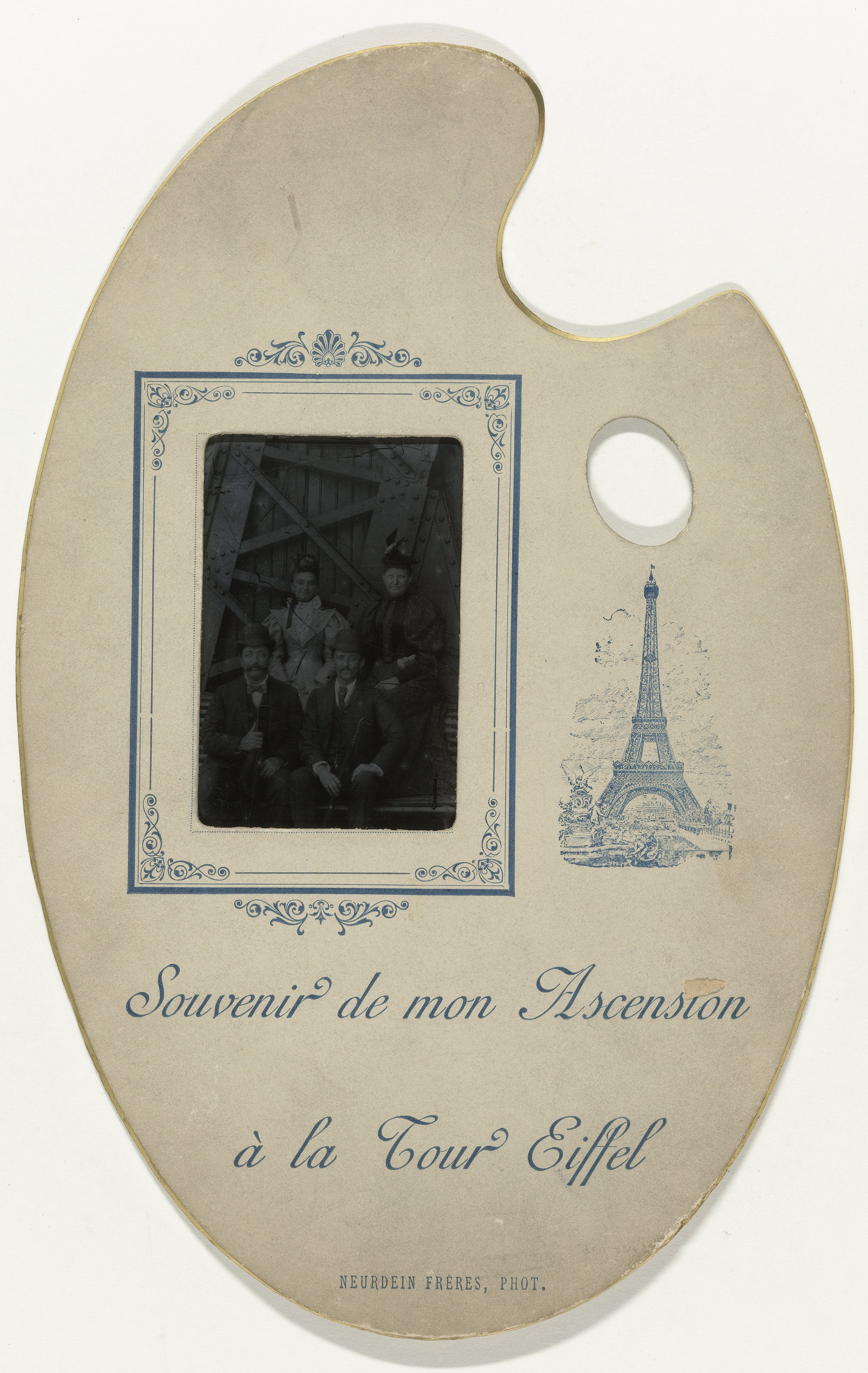
Two men and two women on the Eiffel tower, Paris, France, Neurdein Frères, c. 1889–1914

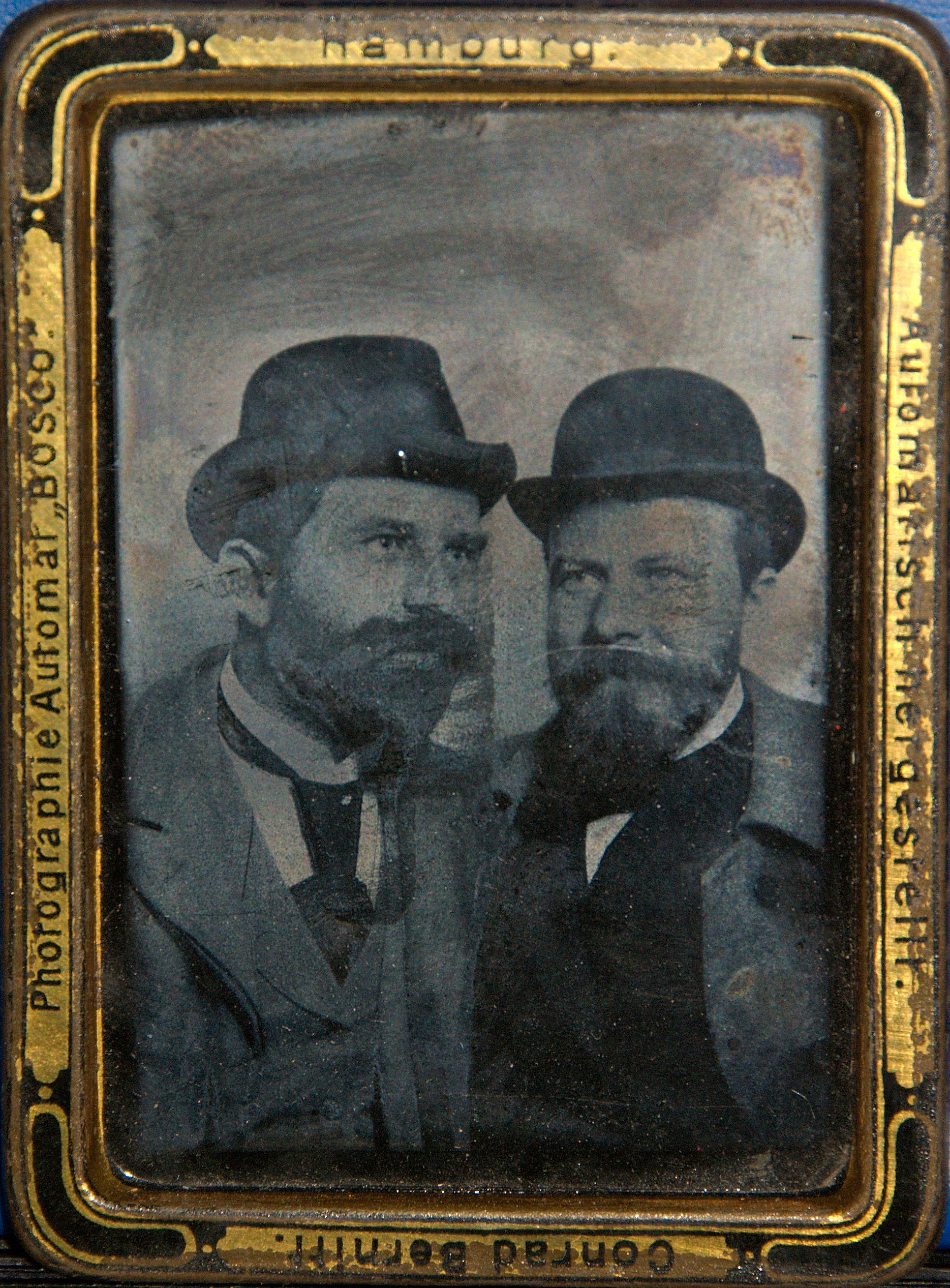
Ferrotype from a Bosco photo booth, Hamburg, Germany, after 1890

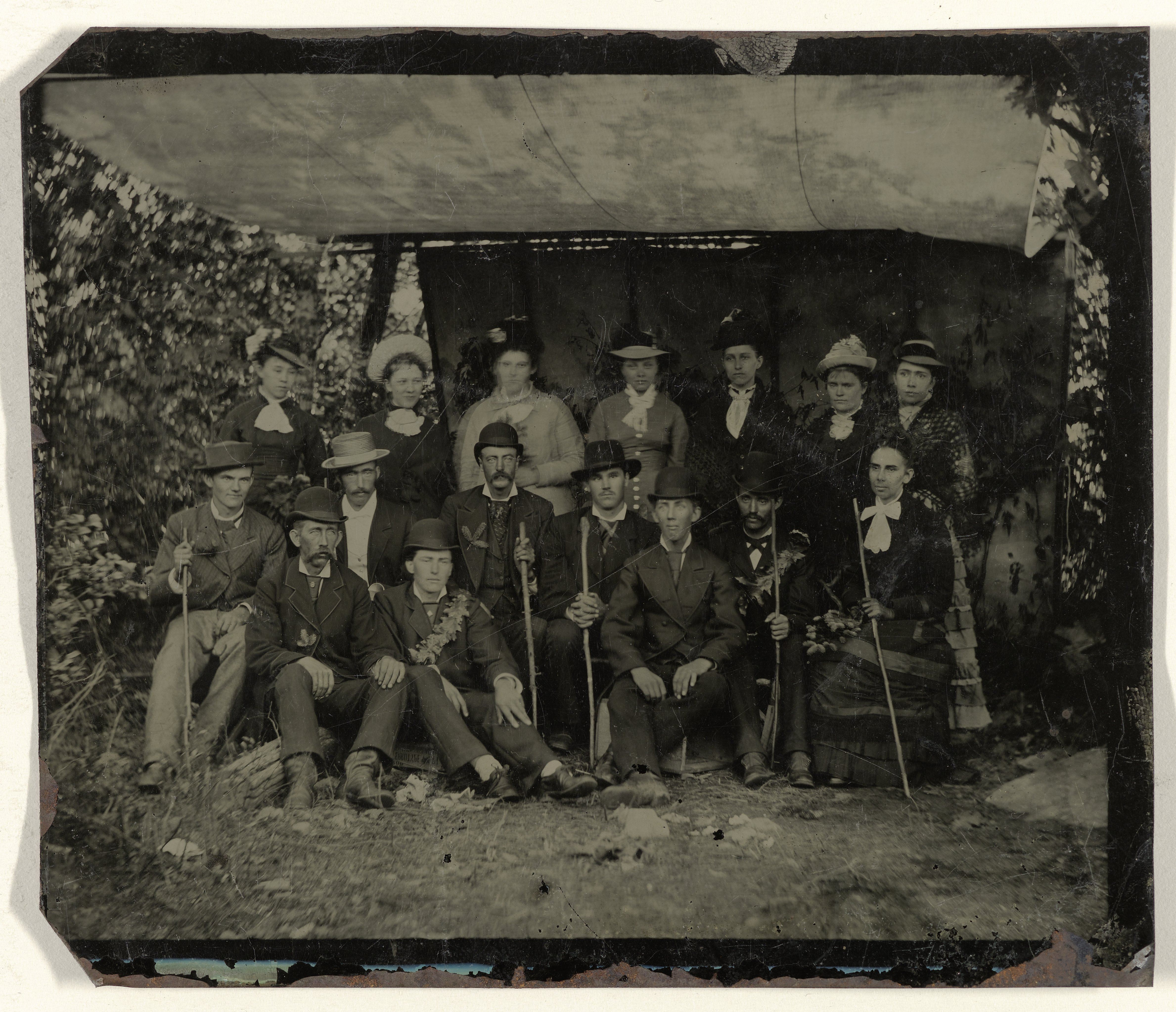
Portrait of a group of sixteen men and women on a hiking trip under makeshift stilted cloths, USA, c. 1890–1915

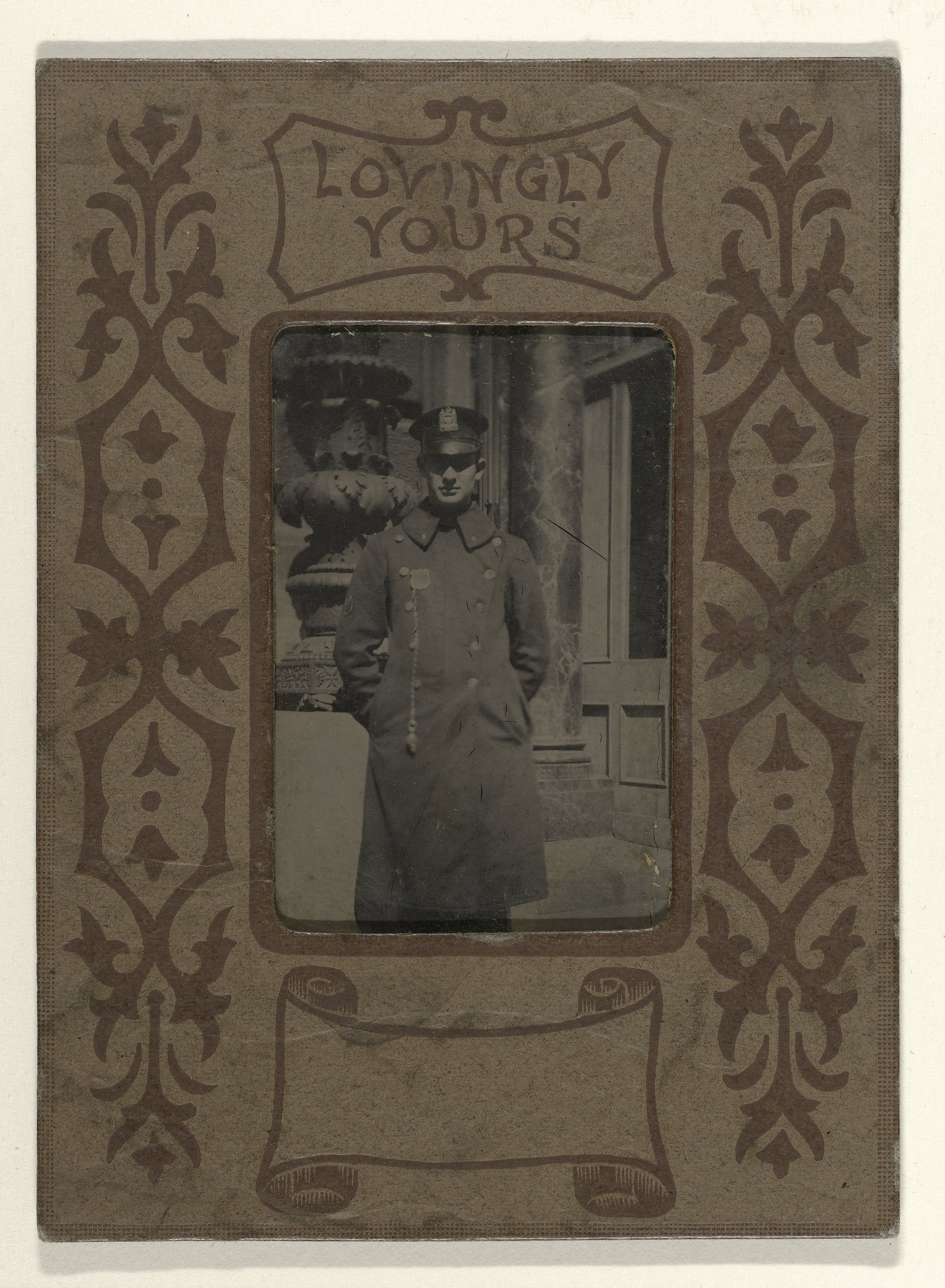
Tintype in a paper mat as greeting card, USA, 1900–1920

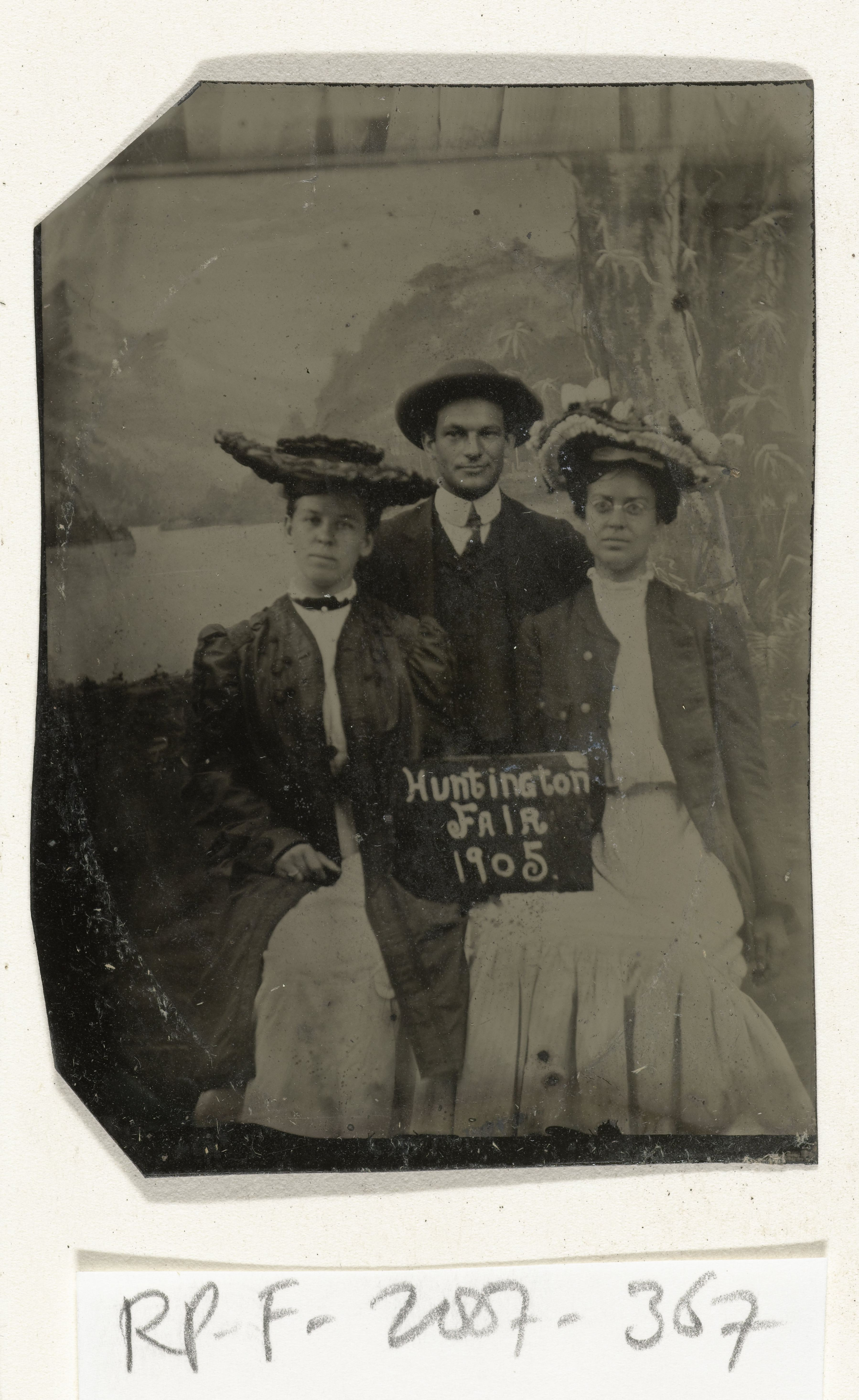
Portrait of a man and two women holding a signboard reading "Huntington Fair 1905"

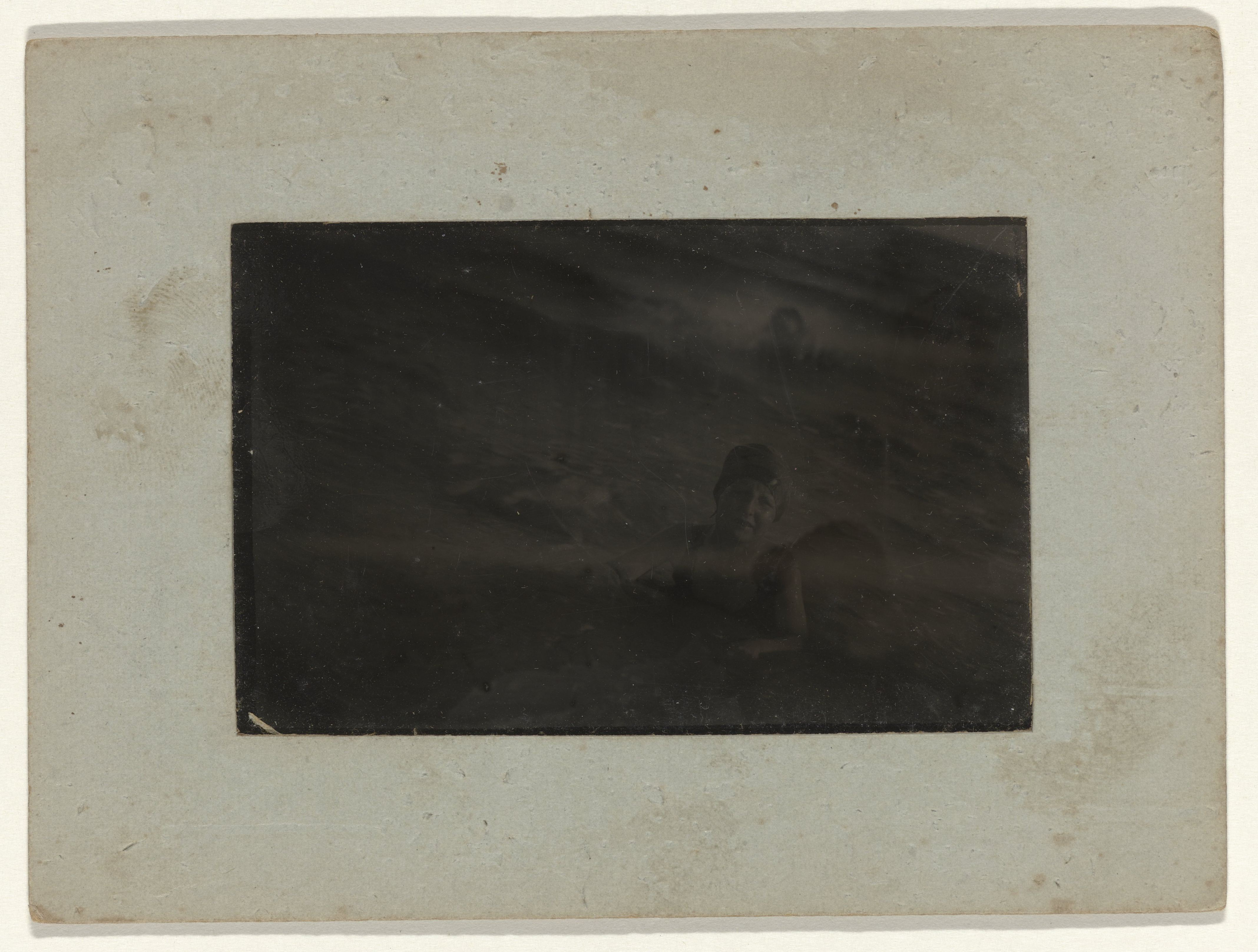
A snapshot-like tintype on the beach of Valkeveen in the Netherlands, c. 1915–1925

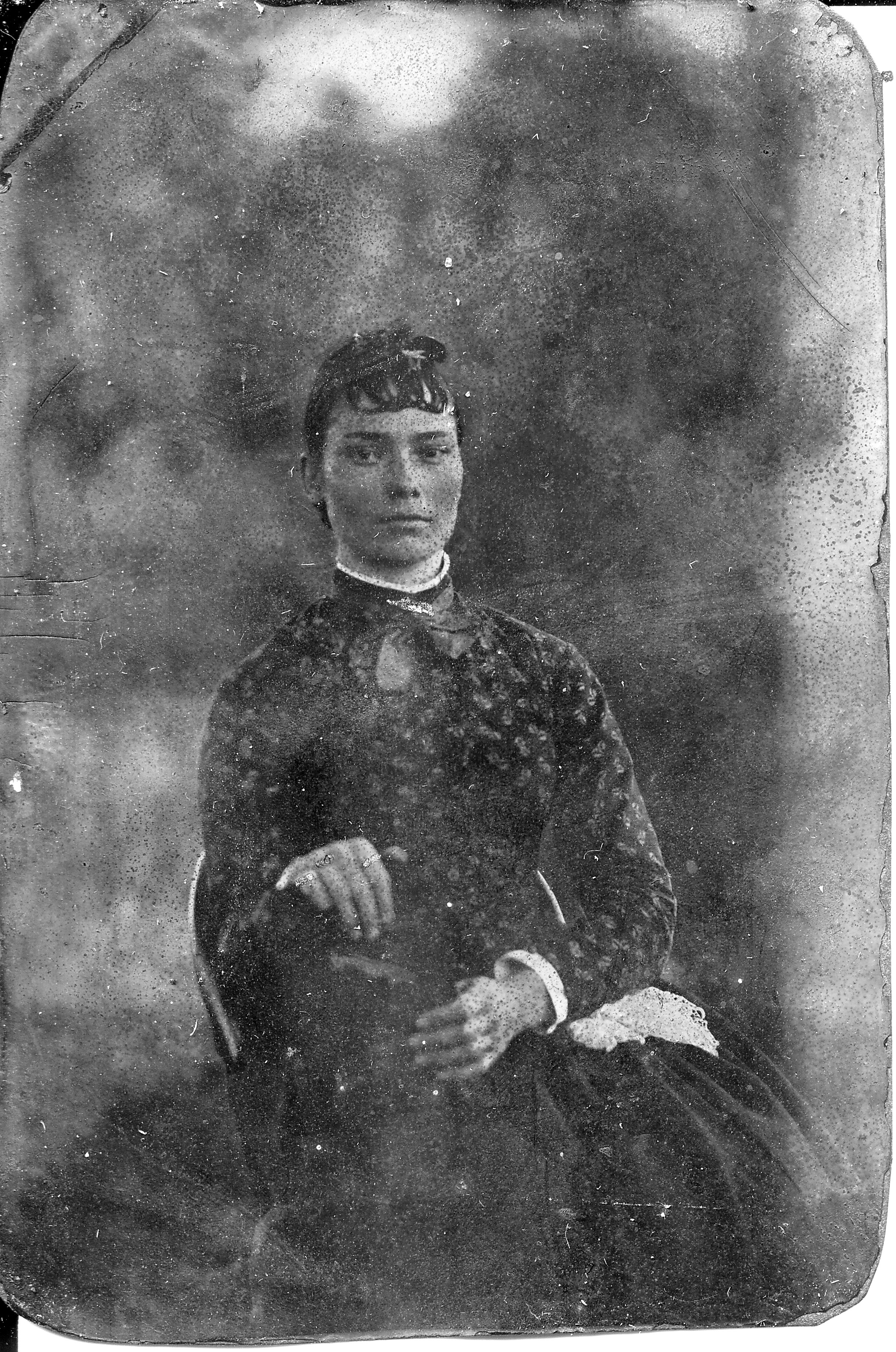
Brom Kellie Taken Oct 25 1877

== See also ==
- Albumen print
- Ambrotype
- Calotype
- Collodion process
- Daguerreotype
- Lippmann plate
