= 1854 in the United Kingdom =

Events from the year 1854 in the United Kingdom.

== Incumbents ==
- Monarch – Victoria
- Prime Minister – George Hamilton-Gordon, 4th Earl of Aberdeen (Coalition)

== Events ==
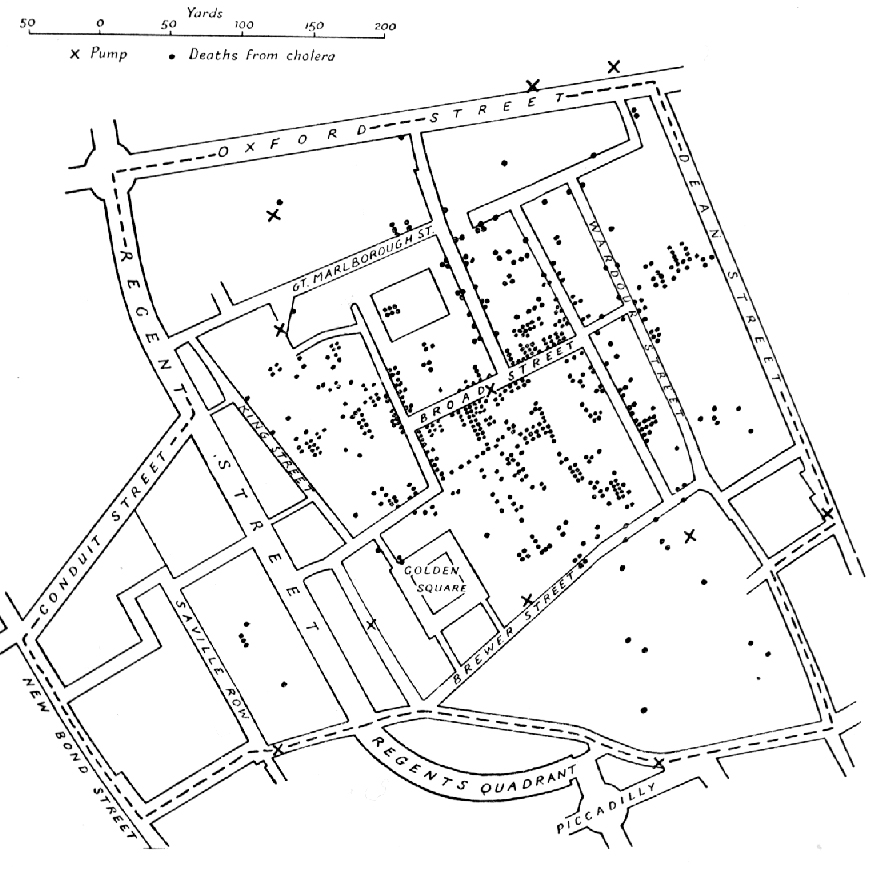
Original map by Dr John Snow showing the clusters of cholera cases in the London epidemic of Summer 1854.

- January – The War Department begins establishment of Aldershot Garrison as its first permanent centralised large-scale army training camp.
- 21 January – The iron clipper RMS Tayleur runs aground on Lambay Island (off the east coast of Ireland) on her maiden voyage out of Liverpool with the loss of at least 300 of around 650 on board.
- 13 February – Cheltenham Ladies' College admits its first pupils.
- 17 February – The British recognise the independence of the Orange Free State.
- 23February – Hadley v Baxendale decided in the Exchequer Court, the leading case on applicability of consequential damages.
- 24 February – Northcote–Trevelyan Report on the organisation of the permanent civil service is published.
- 27 February – Britain sends Russia an ultimatum to withdraw from two Ottoman provinces it has conquered, Moldavia and Wallachia.
- 1 March – Inman Line's SS City of Glasgow sets out from Liverpool on passage to the United States with 480 on board; she is lost without trace.
- 11 March – Royal Navy fleet sails from Britain under Vice Admiral Sir Charles Napier.
- 21 March–late April – Giuseppe Garibaldi visits Tyneside.
- 28 March – United Kingdom declares war on Russia thus joining the Crimean War.
- 1 April – Hard Times begins serialisation in Charles Dickens's magazine, Household Words.
- 26 April – 'National Day of Fast and Humiliation' held, in support of the Crimean War.
- c. 28 April – Rowland Hill (postal reformer) becomes Secretary of the Post Office, programme of purpose-built Post Offices initiated.
- 4 May – Religious Tract Society publishes the first issue of The Sunday at Home, 'a family magazine for Sabbath reading'.
- May – Holman Hunt first exhibits the original version of his painting The Light of the World, together with The Awakening Conscience, at the Royal Academy Summer Exhibition.
- 10 June – The Crystal Palace reopens in Sydenham, south London with life-size dinosaur models in the grounds.
- 15 June – Cuddesdon College is inaugurated by Samuel Wilberforce, Bishop of Oxford, as a diocesan Anglican seminary.
- 21 June – Crimean War: In the First Battle of Bomarsund in Åland, Royal Navy mate Charles Davis Lucas throws a live Russian artillery shell overboard before it explodes, for which incident he will be the first to be retroactively awarded the Victoria Cross in 1857.
- 22 July – Discovery of the asteroid 30 Urania by John Russell Hind.
- August – The Oxford University Act 1854 reforms the University of Oxford, opening it to undergraduates outside the Church of England by abolishing the requirement to undergo a religious test or take the Oath of Supremacy.
- 10 August
  - Youthful Offenders Act limits prison sentences for under-16s and extends the system of reformatory schools for them.
  - Merchant Shipping Act 1854 introduces official numbers for ships, revises calculations of tonnage, vests management of Scottish lighthouses in the Northern Lighthouse Board and provides for rewards to lifesavers leading to creation of the Sea Gallantry Medal.
- 12 August – Prorogation of Parliament, the last time this is carried out by the monarch in person, and the last time royal assent to its Acts is given in person.
- 16 August – Crimean War: second Battle of Bomarsund – after a three-day bombardment, Russian troops on the island of Bomarsund in Åland surrender to combined French and British forces.
- 27 August – Alfred Wills and party set out for the first ascent of the Wetterhorn in Switzerland, regarded as the start of the "golden age of alpinism".
- 31 August–8 September – An epidemic of cholera in London kills 10,000. Dr John Snow traces the source of one outbreak (that killed 500) to a single water pump, validating his theory that cholera is water-borne, and forming the starting point for epidemiology.
- 18 September – St George's Hall, Liverpool opens.
- 20 September – Crimean War: at the Alma, the Franco-British alliance wins the first battle of the war.
- c. October – George Airy calculates the mean density of the Earth by measuring the gravity in a coal mine in South Shields.
- 6 October – The great fire of Newcastle and Gateshead is ignited by a spectacular explosion.
- 17 October – Crimean War: Siege of Sevastopol begins.
- 21 October – Florence Nightingale leaves England with 38 other trained volunteer nurses for Selimiye Barracks at Scutari in the Ottoman Empire, where they arrive the following month to care for British Army troops invalided from the Crimean War.
- 25 October – Crimean War: the Battle of Balaclava occurs, overall a victory for the allies, but including the disastrous cavalry Charge of the Light Brigade.
- 5 November – Crimean War: Russians defeated at the Battle of Inkerman.
- 14 November – Great Storm of 1854 in the Black Sea: 19 British transport and other ships supporting the Crimean War are wrecked with the loss of at least 287 men.
- 30 November – SS Nile is wrecked on The Stones reef off Godrevy Head on the north Cornwall coast, with the loss of all on board – at least 40.
- 4 December – The Distinguished Conduct Medal is instituted by Royal warrant, the first regulated military decoration available to other ranks of the British Army.
- 20 December – In the case of Talbot v Laroche, pioneer of photography William Fox Talbot fails in asserting that the collodion process infringes his calotype patent. The case allows more freedom for other early photographers to experiment and accelerates the development of photography.

=== Unknown dates ===
- Prudential Assurance begins selling the relatively new concept of industrial branch insurance policies to the working classes for premiums as low as one penny through agents acting as door to door salesmen.
- Brown and Polson's patent cornflour first produced, in Paisley.

== Publications ==
- George Boole's influential work on algebraic logic An Investigation of the Laws of Thought, on Which are Founded the Mathematical Theories of Logic and Probabilities.
- Charles Dickens' social novel Hard Times.
- Barbara Leigh Smith's A Brief Summary in Plain Language of the Most Important Laws Concerning Women, Together with a Few Observations Thereon.
- Alfred Tennyson's poem "The Charge of the Light Brigade".
- William Makepeace Thackeray's satirical fantasy The Rose and the Ring.

== Births ==
- 4 March – Napier Shaw, meteorologist (died 1945)
- 28 March – George White, businessman (died 1916)
- 31 March – Dugald Clerk, mechanical engineer (died 1932)
- 28 April – Hertha Ayrton, engineer, inventor and suffragette (died 1923)
- 9 June – Weedon Grossmith, writer (died 1919)
- 13 June – Charles A. Parsons, inventor (died 1931)
- 18 July – Montague Gluckstein, caterer (died 1922)
- 16 October – Oscar Wilde, writer (died 1900)
- 17 October – Queenie Newall, archer (died 1929)
- 24 December – Thomas Stevens, cyclist (died 1935)

== Deaths ==
- 8 January
  - William Beresford, 1st Viscount Beresford, general and politician (born 1768)
  - Benjamin Lewis Vulliamy, clockmaker (born 1780)
- 17 February – John Martin, painter (born 1789)
- 25 February – Ann Walker, landowner and philanthropist (born 1803)
- 6 March – Charles Vane, 3rd Marquess of Londonderry, soldier, politician and nobleman (born 1778)
- 13 March – Sir Thomas Talfourd, jurist (born 1795)
- 3 April – John Wilson, writer (born 1785)
- 15 April – Arthur Aikin, chemist and mineralogist (born 1773)
- 29 April – Henry Paget, 1st Marquess of Anglesey, general (born 1768)
- 1 May – Robert Barclay Allardice ("Capt. Barclay"), Scottish-born competitive walker (born 1779)
- 26 May – Hyde Parker, admiral (born 1784)
- 29 August – William Brockedon, painter (born 1787)
- 1 November – Charles Geach, industrialist, banker and politician (born 1808)
- 2 November – George Mogridge (Old Humphrey), miscellaneous writer and poet (born 1787)
- 12 November – Charles Kemble, actor (born 1775)
- 18 November – Edward Forbes, naturalist (born 1815)
- 25 November – John Gibson Lockhart, writer and editor (born 1794)
