= Martin Laroche =

Martin Laroche may refer to:

- Martin Laroche (photographer) (1814–1886), English photographer
- Martin Laroche (director), Canadian film director and screenwriter
