= Talbot v Laroche =

Talbot V. Laroche
- Court: Guildhall, London
- Full case name: William Fox Talbot and Martin Laroche
- Decided: 1854

Case history
- Related actions: Intellectual Property and Photographic Society

Court membership
- Judge sitting: Sir John Jervis

Case opinions
- Decision by: Chief Justice of the Common Pleas

Keywords
- Patent law

Talbot v Laroche (unreported) was an 1854 legal action, pivotal to the history of photography, by which William Fox Talbot sought to assert that Martin Laroche's use of the unpatented, collodion process infringed his calotype patent.

== Background ==
Fox Talbot had developed the calotype process and patented it in 1841 to run until 1855. By 1852, many in the photographic community felt that Fox Talbot's insistence on the economic rights in his intellectual property were hampering the development of photography in England and had called upon him to relinquish his patent. He had made a concession by allowing a free licence to amateur photographers but he still insisted that professionals pay an annual licence fee. The situation was exacerbated by Fox Talbot's insistence that Frederick Scott Archer's collodion process was covered by his patent. The collodion process was widely used and there was disquiet among the professional photographic community at the payment of a licence to Fox Talbot, rather than Archer, for its use.

In 1854, Fox Talbot applied to the Privy Council for an extension of his patent and Laroche was instrumental in fomenting opposition. Laroche was a professional photographer who has been claimed as a collaborator of Archer. He orchestrated the Photographic Society's public opposition to an extension and entered his own formal objection with the Privy Council. As a deliberate casus belli, he advertised his photographic services in The Times, stating that he used "the new process on paper", the collodion process. Laroche's solicitor was Peter Fry, an amateur photographer who had been active against the original patent.

Fox Talbot had won actions against other photographers and sued Laroche for £5,000 damages (£350,000 at 2003 prices) for infringement of his patent.

== Legal argument ==
Fox Talbot claimed that his patent covered "the making visible photographic images upon paper ... by washing them with liquid" and argued that Laroche's use of pyrogallic acid rather than his own mixture of silver nitrate, acetic acid, and gallic acid was immaterial.

Laroche argued:

1. There was prior art in the calotype patent rendering it invalid. In particular, the method had been developed by Joseph Bancroft Reade and described in an 1839 lecture.
2. The technique used by Laroche differed in that:
  1. It used pyrogallic, rather than gallic, acid; and
  2. It used collodion rather than paper.

== Case ==
The case was heard 18–20 December 1854 in the Guildhall, London before Chief Justice of the Common Pleas Sir John Jervis.

Fox Talbot's leading counsel was Sir Frederick Thesiger, later to become Attorney-General, assisted by William Robert Grove, a barrister and distinguished scientist who was to go on to become a judge. The first witness was Fox Talbot and Grove performed the examination-in-chief. There were then ten witnesses for Fox Talbot:

- Alfred Noble
- Dr Miller
- William Thomas Brande
- Prof. August Wilhelm von Hofmann
- Henry Medlock
- William Crookes
- Nevil Story Maskelyne
- Antoine Claudet
- Henry ‘Collins’ (Collen)
- William Carpmael (1804–1867, Talbot's patent agent)

Laroche did not give evidence but the witnesses called by his counsel included:

- Joseph Bancroft Reade
- Edward William Brayley
- Andrew Ross
- Robert Hunt
- A. Normandy
- Dr J. Stenhouse
- C. Heisch
- T. Taylor
- W. H. Thornthwaite
- Mr Elliott
- Mr (possibly T. S.) Redmond

Thesinger gave the closing speech for Fox Talbot and Jervis gave a lengthy summing up for the jury.

== Verdict ==
The jury found that Fox Talbot was "the first and true inventor of the calotype process ... the first person who disclosed it to the public" but that Laroche had not infringed his patent.

== Bibliography ==
- Wood, R. D. (1971b) (March 1971). "'Gallic acid and Talbot's calotype patent (Part II of J. B. Reade, F.R.S. and the early history of photography)'". Annals of Science. 27 (1): 47–83. doi:10.1080/00033797100203627. Archived from the original on 11 March 2010.
- Wood, R. D. (1971c) (September 1971). "'The photographic patent case, Talbot v. Henderson, 1854'". Annals of Science. 27 (3): 239–264. doi:10.1080/00033797100203777. Archived from the original on 11 March 2010.
- Wood, R. D. (1975). The Calotype Patent Lawsuit of Talbot v. Laroche 1854. Bromley, Kent: privately published. ISBN 0-9504377-0-0. Archived from the original on 23 March 2010.
