= Early photographers of York =

Early photographers of York include:

- Edwin F Fox
- Bishops
- Fox Talbot
- William Hayes
- Roger Fenton
- William Pumphrey
- George Fowler Jones architect
- W. P. Glaisby
- Francis Frith
- J. W. (Mrs. Milward) Knowles
- Joseph Duncan

Early photos of York by some of these photographers can also be found online.

Early photography is generally reckoned to be pre-1900.
