= Joseph Bancroft Reade =

English scientist and photographer

Reade in the mid-1850s.

Rev. Joseph Bancroft Reade FRS FRMS (5 April 1801 – 12 December 1870) was an English clergyman, amateur scientist and pioneer of photography. A gentleman scientist, Reade co-founded the Royal Microscopical Society and the Royal Meteorological Society.

== Early life ==
Born Leeds, he was the eldest of six sons and two daughters. His father, Thomas Shaw Bancroft Reade (1776–1841), was a merchant and Christian pamphleteer who actively supported the British and Foreign Bible Society. His mother, Sarah née Paley (d. 1825), was a relative of William Paley. He was educated at Leeds Grammar School, Trinity College, Cambridge and Gonville and Caius College, Cambridge, graduating in 1825.

== Clerical career ==
Reade was ordained a deacon in the Church of England and became curate of Kegworth, Leicestershire. He married Charlotte Dorothy Farish (1796–1882), niece of William Farish in 1825, and the couple parented three children, none of whom lived beyond 21 years of age. Reade was ordained priest in 1826 and took his master's degree in 1828.

In 1829, Reade became curate of Halifax Parish Church where he befriended amateur meteorologist John Waterhouse, who would later invent the Waterhouse stop. In 1832 he took a part-time curacy at Harrow Weald, and in 1834 became proprietor of a school in Peckham.

John Lee and the Royal Astronomical Society jointly owned the advowson of the parish of Stone, Buckinghamshire and they appointed Reade vicar in 1839. In his 20 years as incumbent, Reade established a school and an astronomical observatory.

In 1859, Reade became vicar of Ellesborough, Buckinghamshire, and from 1863 until his death, rector of Bishopsbourne, near Canterbury.Towards the end of his life, Reade suffered from cancer and died from jaundice at the Bishopsbourne rectory. He was buried at St Mary's Church.

== Scientific work ==
Reade was an enthusiastic amateur scientist. His first work was in optics and, in particular, microscopy. His first scientific paper in 1836 was on the use of a pair of convex lenses to focus light on a microscopic specimen without overheating. Reade was interested in chemistry and botany, performing microscopic investigations of various specimens including microfossils. His knowledge of metal salts led to an 1846 ink patent. A design for a telescope eyepiece won a medal at The Great Exhibition in 1851, and he designed a condenser, known as "Reade's kettledrum" (1861), and a novel prism (1869).

In September 1839, Reade was one of 17 gentlemen scientists who met at 50 Wellclose Square, London, the home of John Thomas Quekett, to found the Microscopical Society of London, which later became the Royal Microscopical Society.

== Photography ==
Reade was present at the Royal Society to hear William Fox Talbot's first presentations on photography in February 1839 and immediately started to experiment himself.

Reade was also at the Royal Society on 14 March to hear Sir John Herschel's seminal paper on photography in which Herschel proposed sodium hyposulfite as a fixer. (The fictional discovery of a salt-solution fixer is portrayed in the film The Governess.)

Herschel also made some observations on the light sensitivity of silver carbonate, nitrate and acetate as being superior to silver chloride.

Reade began experimenting with light-sensitive substances in a solar microscope, for the intensity of the light it projected to produce images of small transparent objects. He soon discovered that he could get much better results when the silver salt was applied not to paper but to tanned leather. Allegedly, he used his wife's gloves for experiments. Reade conjectured that the difference in sensitivity was caused by gallic acid used for tanning, and indeed by treating paper with gallic acid before soaking it in silver nitrate solution, he could drastically increase the sensitivity.

In 1854, Reade testified at the Talbot v. Laroche trial, where Laroche tried to prove that Talbot's calotype patent was invalid because the use of gallic acid was first discovered by Reade, from whom Talbot learned it. In his testimony, however, Reade upheld Talbot's originality, explaining that while he had used gallic acid for preprocessing the light-sensitive paper, Talbot was the first to discover that gallic acid can reveal the latent image in an already exposed paper, i.e. he was the first to develop a photographic material. In fact, Reade erred in making the latter broad statement, as the earlier Daguerreotype process also involved the chemical development of an initially invisible latent image.

== Offices and honours ==
- Member of the British Association for the Advancement of Science, (1831);
- Fellow of the Royal Society, {1838);
- Microscopical Society of London (Royal Microscopical Society)
  - Founding member, (1839);
  - President, (1870);
- Founding member of the British Meteorological Society (1850};
- Photographic Society
  - Member, (1855);
  - Vice-president.

== See also ==
- Reade Peak, peak in Antarctica named for him.

== Bibliography ==
- Obituary:
  - Kentish Gazette, 20 December 1870, p.5
- Wood, R. D. (2001). "Rev. J. B. Reade (1801–1870): a Bibliography Part 1, works written by Reade". R. Derek Wood, 2001. Archived from the original on 11 September 2015.
- Major, A. (1989). "Bishopsbourne's eminent (but forgotten) Victorian: the Rev. Joseph Bancroft Reade'". Bygone Kent: March, 171–7.
- Mathews, G.E.; Crabtree, J.I. (May 1953). "First Use of Hypo" (PDF). Image, Journal of Photography of George Eastman House. 2 (5). Rochester, N.Y.: International Museum of Photography at George Eastman House Inc.: 26–27. Archived from the original (PDF) on 9 September 2015.
- Millar, J. (1871) Monthly Microscopical Journal 5:92–6
- Oakden, C. H. (1926). "Joseph Bancroft Reade: his contributions to microscopical science". Journal of the Royal Microscopical Society. 46 (3): 181–92. doi:10.1111/j.1365-2818.1926.tb05205.x.
- "The photographic work of the Rev. Joseph Bancroft Reade". British Journal of Photography: 435–5, 466–7. 1928.
- Reade, A. L. (1906). The Reades of Blackwood Hill in the Parish of Horton, Staffordshire: A Record of their Descendants. London: privately printed. pp. 85–102., "Pedigree XXV: Reade of Leeds, etc."
- Venn, J.; et al. (1898). Biographical History of Gonville and Caius College, 2: 1713–1897.
- Wood, R. D. (1971). "J. B. Reade and the early history of photography". Annals of Science. 27: 13–83. doi:10.1080/00033797100203617. Archived from the original on 6 February 2010.
- "J. B. Reade's Early Photographic Experiments: recent further evidence on the legend". British Journal of Photography. 119: 644–646, 643. 1972a. Archived from the original on 13 September 2014.
- "J. B. Reade's early photographic experiments". British Journal of Photography: 28 July. 1972b.
- Wood, Derek (1980). "Latent Developments from Gallic Acid, 1839". Journal of Photographic Science. 28 (1): 36–41. doi:10.1080/00223638.1980.11738050. Archived from the original on 10 September 2007.
- "Straightening the record on Reade". British Journal of Photography: 3 July. 1996.
- — (2004) "Reade, Joseph Bancroft (1801–1870)", by R. D. Wood, Oxford Dictionary of National Biography, Oxford University Press; online edn, May 2007. Retrieved 8 August 2007 (subscription required)

For all of R. D. Wood's publications see his "Midley History of early Photography". Archived from the original on 8 February 2014. www.midley.co.uk (archived at UK WebArchive).
