= The Pencil of Nature =

First book containing photographs

Cover of The Pencil of Nature, 1844

The Pencil of Nature is an 1844 book by William Henry Fox Talbot. It is notable for being the first commercially published book to be illustrated with photographs.

Published by Longman, Brown, Green & Longmans in six fascicles between 1844 and 1846, the book detailed Talbot's development of the calotype photographic process and included 24 calotype prints, each one pasted in by hand, illustrating some of the possible applications of the new technology. It is regarded as an important and influential work in the history of photography and was described by the Metropolitan Museum of Art as "a milestone in the art of the book greater than any since Gutenberg's invention of moveable type."

At the time of The Pencil of Nature's publication, photography was still an unfamiliar concept for most people—The Athenaeum, a contemporary British magazine, described Talbot's work as "modern necromancy"—and the book was the first opportunity for the general public to see what photographs looked like. To avoid confusion, Talbot inserted the following notice into the book:

The plates of the present work are impressed by the agency of Light alone, without any aid whatever from the artist's pencil. They are the sun-pictures themselves, and not, as some persons have imagined, engravings in imitation.

The cover page of The Pencil of Nature eclectically clashed the Baroque, Celtic, and Medieval styles, as was characteristic of the Victorian era. Its symmetrical design, letterforms, and intricate carpet pages are similar to and a pastiche of the Book of Kells.

The Pencil of Nature was published and sold one section at a time, without any binding. As with many books of the time, purchasers were expected to have it bound themselves once all the installments had been released. Talbot planned a large number of installments; however, the book was not a commercial success and he was forced to terminate the project after completing only six.

== Photographs ==
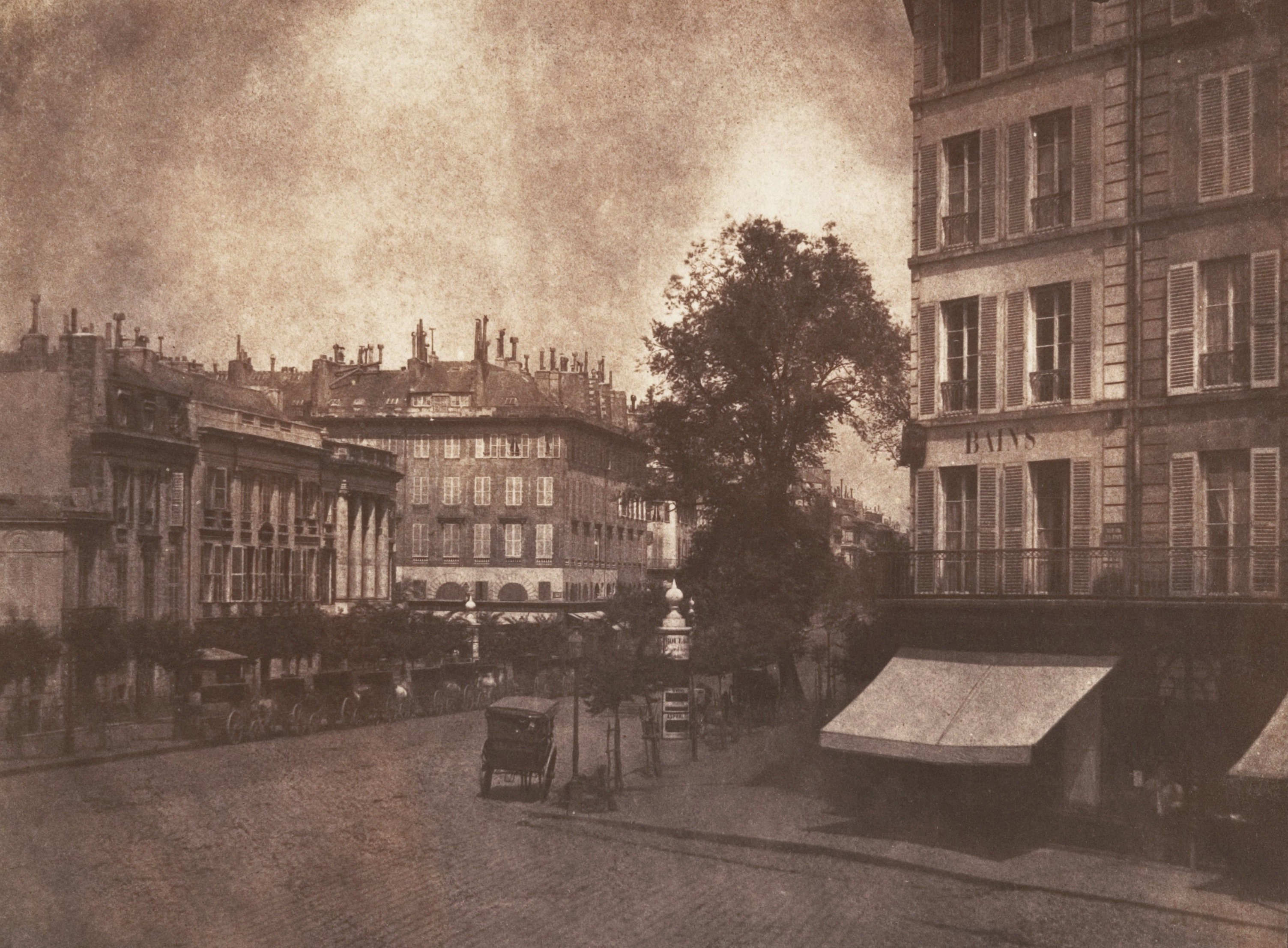
View of the Boulevards at Paris

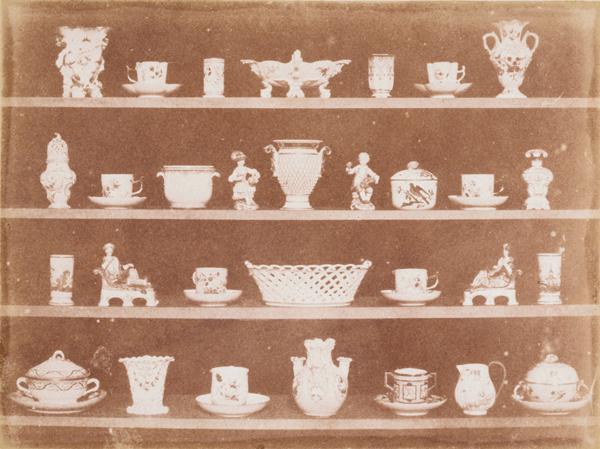
Articles of China

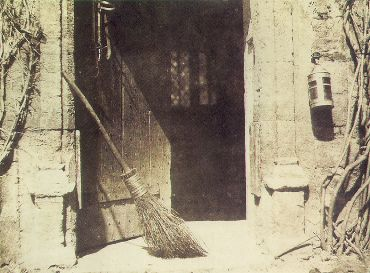
The Open Door

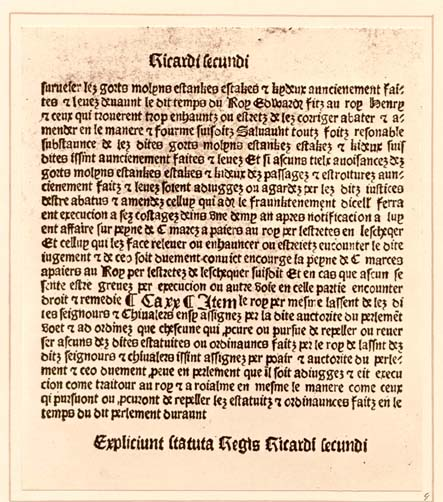
Fac-simile of an Old Printed Page

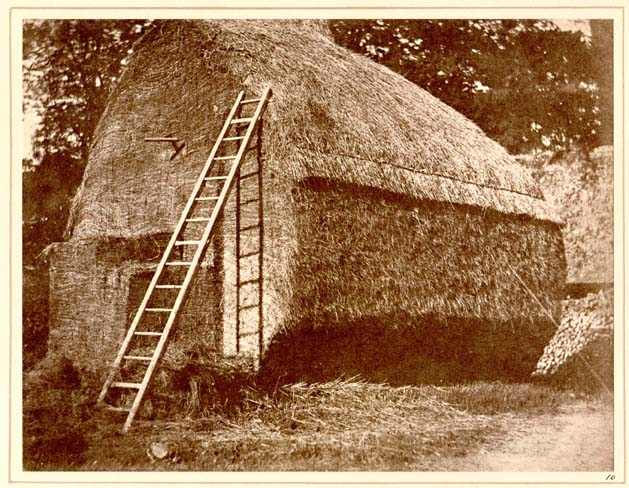
The Haystack

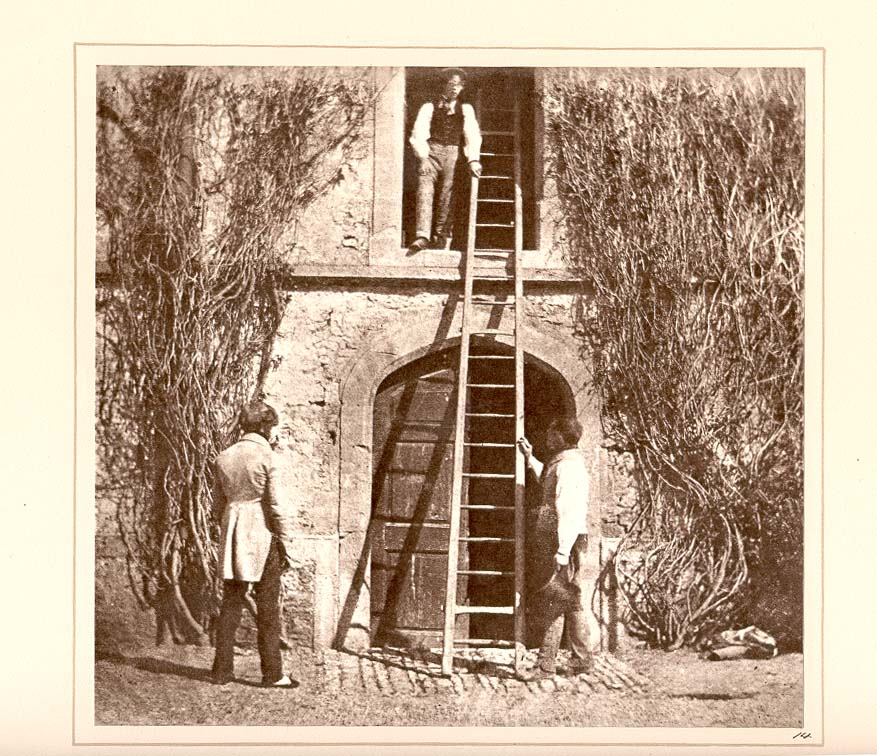
The Ladder

The 24 plates in the book were carefully selected to demonstrate a wide variety of potential applications for photography. They include a variety of architectural studies, scenes, still lifes, and closeups, as well as facsimiles of prints, sketches, and text. Due to the long exposure times required in early photography, however, Talbot only included one image depicting people, The Ladder (Plate XIV). Talbot also sought to demonstrate photography's potential as a new artistic medium with images like The Open Door (Plate VI).

The complete list of plates is as follows:

- Part 1
  - I. Part of Queen's College, Oxford
  - II. View of the Boulevards at Paris
  - III. Articles of China
  - IV. Articles of Glass
  - V. Bust of Patroclus
- Part 2
  - VI. The Open Door
  - VII. Leaf of a Plant
  - VIII. A Scene in a Library
  - IX. Fac-simile of an Old Printed Page
  - X. The Haystack
  - XI. Copy of a Lithographic Print
  - XII. The Bridge of Orléans
- Part 3
  - XIII. Queen's College, Oxford: Entrance Gateway
  - XIV. The Ladder
  - XV. Lacock Abbey in Wiltshire
- Part 4
  - XVI. Cloisters of Lacock Abbey
  - XVII. Bust of Patroclus
  - XVIII. Gate of Christchurch
- Part 5
  - XIX. The Tower of Lacock Abbey
  - XX. Lace
  - XXI. The Martyrs' Monument
- Part 6
  - XXII. Westminster Abbey
  - XXIII. Hagar in the Desert
  - XXIV. A Fruit Piece

== Text ==
Each plate is accompanied by a short text which describes the scene and the photographic processes involved in obtaining it. Talbot emphasized the practical implications of his images (for instance, "The whole cabinet of a Virtuoso and collector of old China might be depicted on paper in little more time than it would take him to make a written inventory describing it in the usual way."), but he also recognized their artistic value ("The chief object of the present work is to place on record some of the early beginnings of a new art, before the period, which we trust is approaching, of its being brought to maturity by the aid of British talent.")

Given the novelty of the subject, Talbot pointed out in the text certain technical aspects that would be obvious to a current reader; for instance: "Groups of figures take no longer time to obtain than single figures would require, since the Camera depicts them all at once, however numerous they may be." He also speculated about such questions as (among others) whether photographs would stand up as evidence in court and whether a camera could be made to record ultraviolet light."

At the beginning of the book, Talbot included an incomplete history of his development of the calotype, titled "Brief Historical Sketch of the Invention of the Art." The history ends rather abruptly, and though Talbot expressed his intention to complete it at a later date, he never did."

== Editions ==
About 40 "substantially complete" copies of the original 1844–1846 edition still exist. At least two facsimile editions have been issued:

- New York: Da Capo Press, 1969.
- New York: Hans P. Kraus Jr., 1989. ISBN 0-9621096-0-6
- Bath: Monmouth Calotype, 1989
