= William Pumphrey =

British photographer

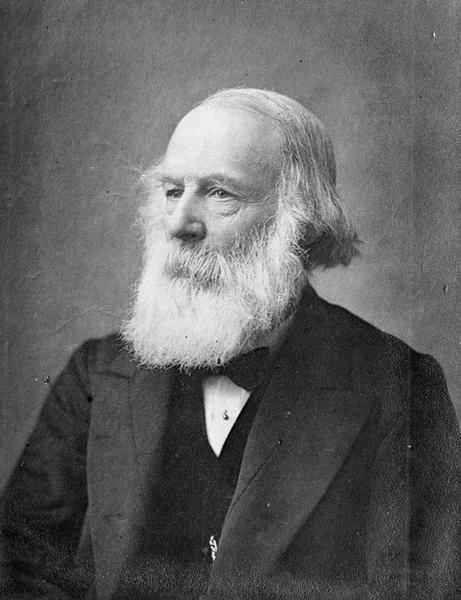
William Pumphrey Portrait

William Pumphrey (1817 – 1905) was an early photographer based in York.

Pumphrey was a Quaker and started out as a science teacher at Bootham School, York. He bought his licence from Samuel Walker, York's first practising photographer, in July 1849, and ran his business there until 1854. Throughout this time he frequently lectured on scientific and kindred subjects; indeed, he continued to lecture - including to Bootham boys - even after taking up his post as superintendent of a private lunatic asylum in York. He was fond of travel, bringing home many photographs of the scenery of Switzerland and elsewhere, which he took pleasure in showing to his friends with the magic lantern.

In 1866, he organised an exhibition of Yorkshire Fine Art and Industry, in the grounds of Bootham Park Hospital, in which he entered two revolving stereoscopes, each containing 50 of his stereo views.

== See also ==
- Early photographers of York
