= Martin Laroche (photographer) =

English photographer

Martin Laroche, born William Henry Silvester, (15 September 1814 – 10 November 1886) was an early English professional photographer who successfully challenged William Fox Talbot's patent on the calotype and effected a liberalisation in professional practice, research and development that catalysed the development of photography in the nineteenth century.

== Life ==
Born in Lambeth, he started work as a jeweller. He married Angelique Samson, in the mid–1830s. By 1851 the couple had five children and Laroche had changed his name, occupying studios in Oxford Street, London and describing himself as a "Daguerreotype artist". He exhibited at The Great Exhibition (1851) and is said to photographed Queen Victoria and actor Charles Kean, though none of the photographs is extant.

== Talbot v. Laroche ==
In 1854, Laroche deliberately fomented a conflict with Talbot by advertising that he was using Frederick Scott Archer's collodion process which Talbot regarded as in breach of his own patent. There are some claims that Laroche had worked with Archer on its development. Others believe the two were introduced by a common friend, photographer William Peirce. Talbot brought a legal action against Laroche for £5,000 but the claim failed. However, Laroche was left with legal costs of £400-£500 though these were raised by public subscription.

== Later life ==
Laroche continued in Oxford Street until the early 1860s and then moved to Birmingham where he died.

== Bibliography ==
- Wood, R. D. (1975). The Calotype Patent Lawsuit of Talbot v. Laroche 1854. Bromley, Kent: privately published. ISBN 0-9504377-0-0. Archived from the original on 23 March 2010.
