= William Hayes (photographer) =

William Hayes (1871–1940) was a Victorian photographer in York.

He moved to the small village of Hutton-le-Hole in the North York Moors in 1911, and his studio is now erected there in the Ryedale Folk Museum. The Hayes photographs include some of the family in the studio, which was built of corrugated aluminium with large glass windows. Many other photographs are of farm workers around Hutton-le-Hole.

== Gallery ==
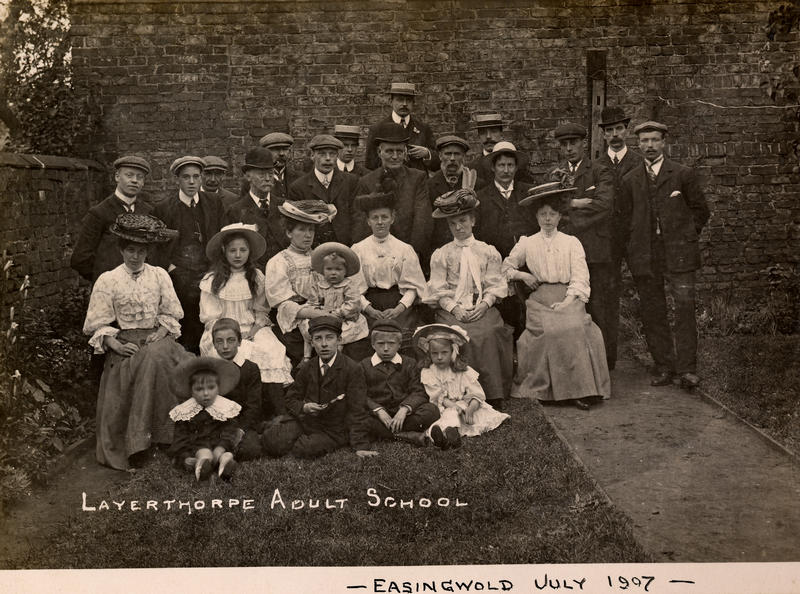
Members of Layerthorpe Adult school pictured at Easingwold in 1907

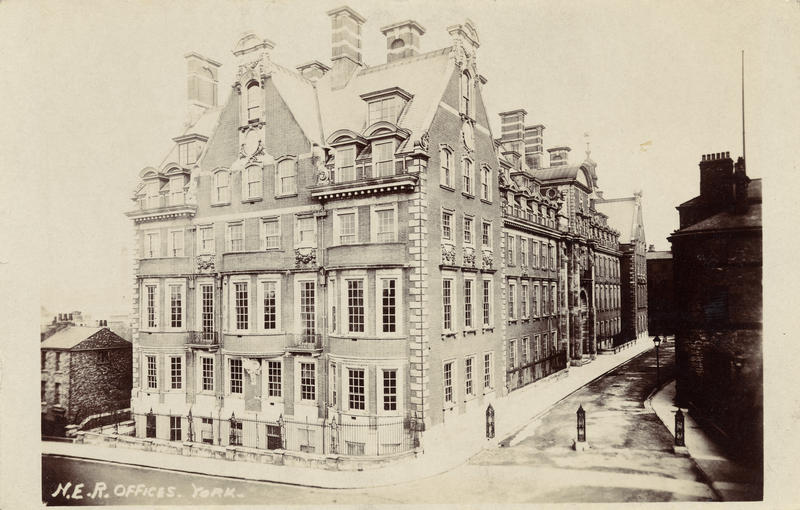
North-Eastern Railway Company Offices on Station Rise, York, c.1906.

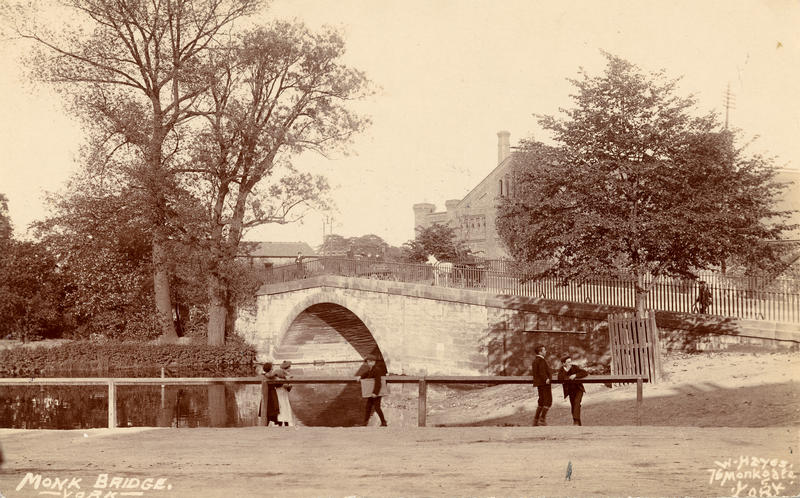
Children playing near Monk Bridge, York, c.1900s.
