= Frederick Scott Archer =

English photographer and sculptor

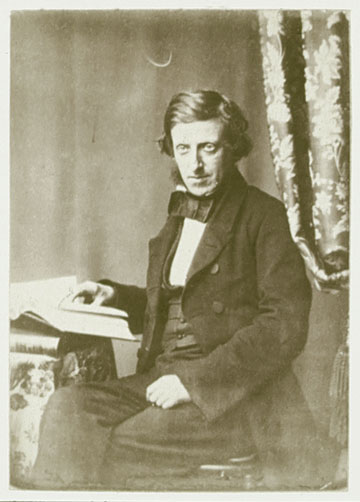
- Frederick Scott Archer – by Robert Cade, c. 1855
- Born: 30 August 1814; Hertford
- Died: 1 May 1857 (aged 42); London
- Resting place: Kensal Green Cemetery
- Occupations: sculptor; photographer
- Known for: Collodion process

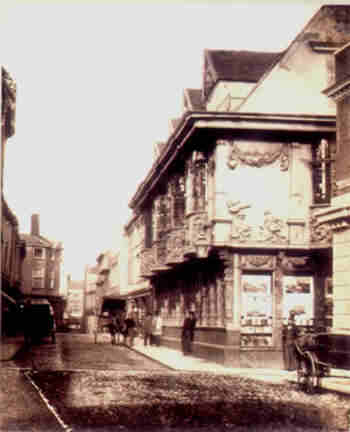
Frederick Scott Archer: Sparrow House, 1857

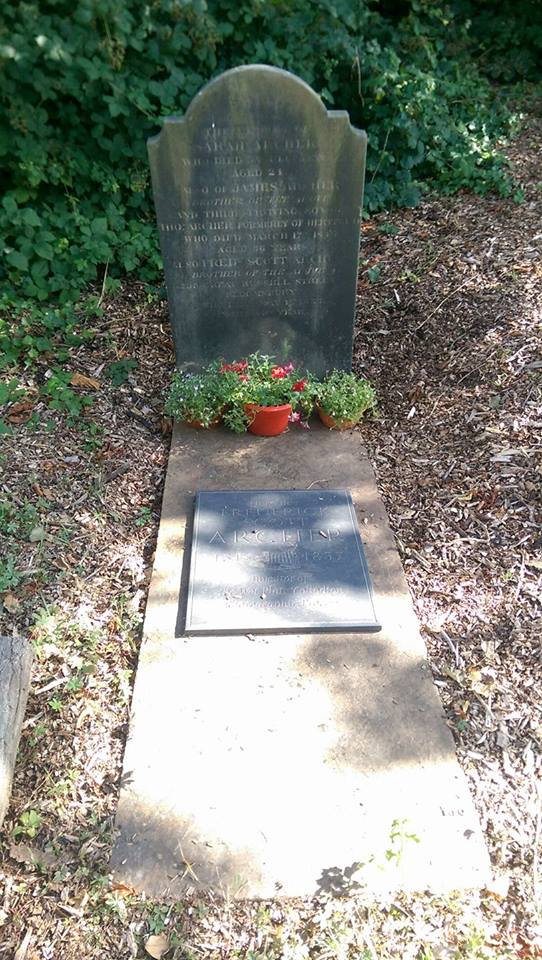
Grave of Frederick Scott Archer in Kensal Green Cemetery, London. Location on map:

Frederick Scott Archer (30 August 1814 – 1 May 1857) was an English chemist, photographer, inventor and sculptor who is best known for having invented the photographic collodion process which preceded the dry gelatin emulsion used on plates and films. He was born in Hertford, within the county of Hertfordshire, England (United Kingdom of Great Britain and Ireland) and is remembered mainly for this single achievement which greatly increased the accessibility of photography for the general public.

== Life ==
Scott Archer was the fifth son, and sixth of seven children, born to Thomas Archer, a Hertford butcher and his wife Elizabeth (née Scott). He left Hertford for London to take an apprenticeship as a goldsmith and silversmith with Mr. Benjamin Massey of 116 Leadenhall Street.

On the recommendation of Edward Hawkins he trained at the Royal Academy Schools as a sculptor and found calotype photography useful as a way of capturing images of his sculptures. Dissatisfied with the poor definition and contrast of the calotype and the long exposures needed, Scott Archer invented the new process in 1848 and published it in The Chemist in March 1851, enabling photographers to combine the fine detail of the daguerreotype with the ability to print multiple paper copies like the calotype. In publishing his discovery, he did so knowingly without first patenting it, giving it as a gift to the world.

As a sculptor, he exhibited at the Royal Academy from 1836 until 1851.

He died impoverished, as since he did not patent the collodion process, he made very little money from it. An obituary described him as "a very inconspicuous gentleman, in poor health."

His family received a gift of £747 after his death, raised by public subscription, and a small pension was also provided to support his three children after the death of their mother.

The Royal Photographic Society has a small collection of Scott Archer's photographs; some are also held in the Victoria and Albert Museum.

Archer died on 1 May 1857 of a hereditary cystic disease of the liver which had plagued him for his last 11 weeks and is buried at Kensal Green Cemetery in London.

== Known Sculptures ==
- Bust of the Sir George Smart (1839)
- Statue of Alfred the Great with he Book of Common Law (1844), Westminster Hall
- Bust of Dean of Manchester (1848)
- Memorial to Lady Albert Conyngham (1850) in Mickleham Church
- Bust of the Marquess of Northampton (1850)
- Statue of Gertrude Hanson (1851)

== Collection ==
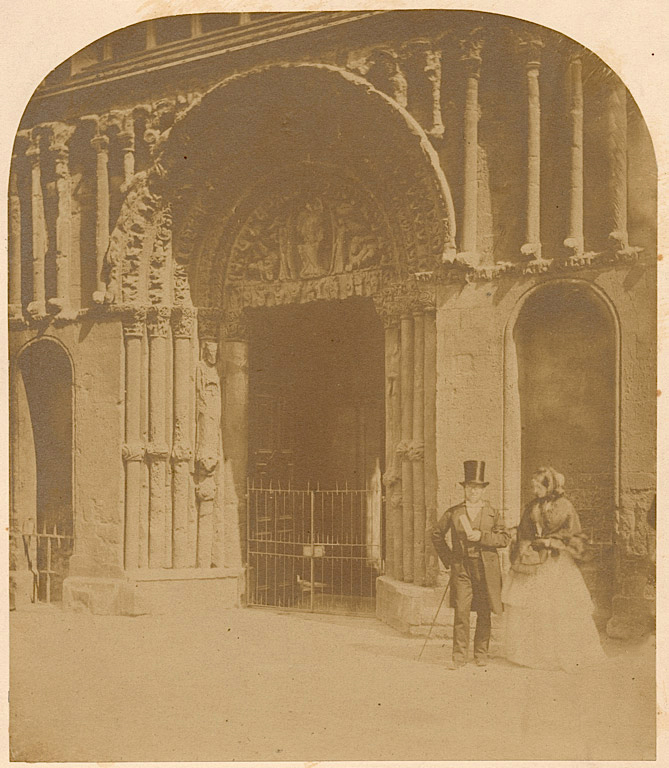
- Frederick Scott Archer (1814–1857), Rochester Cathedral, England, early 1850s, albumen print from wet plate collodion negative, Department of Image Collections, National Gallery of Art Library, Washington, DC
  International Photography Hall of Fame, St.Louis, Missouri

== See also ==
- Louis-Nicolas Ménard
