= Sved =

Sved or SVED may refer to:

== People ==
- Étienne Sved (1914–1996), Hungarian-French photographer and artist
- George Svéd (1910–1994), Hungarian–Australian engineer
- Márta Svéd (1910–2005), Hungarian–Australian mathematician, wife of George
- Peter Sved, Australian filmmaker, director of 2004 short film Crawlspace
- Sándor Svéd (1906 — 9 June 1979), known as Alexander Sved in the US, Hungarian baritone singer

== Other uses ==
- SVED, the ICAO airport code for El Dorado Airport (Venezuela)
