= Ted Castle =

Ted Castle may refer to:

- Edward Castle, Baron Castle (1907–1979), British journalist and politician
- Ted Castle (photographer) (1918–2000), American photojournalist
- Ted Castle, founder of Rhino Foods, an American ice cream manufacturer
