= Busler =

Busler is a surname. Notable people with the surname include:

- Ray Busler (1914–1969), American football player
- Rudolf Busler (fl. 1950–1979), German news photographer and cinematographer

== See also ==
- Husler
