= Alfred Statler =

American painter and photographer

Alfred Statler (1916–1984) was an American painter and magazine photographer active in the 1940s to 1970s.

== Biography ==
Alfred Statler was born Alfred Goldschmidt in the Bronx, New York City, in 1916. He served in Europe for a photography unit during World War II where he developed his photography skills. Returning to New York City he enrolled at Cooper Union and met and married Elizabeth (Betty) Marie Eslinger (1921–2013). In 1952 the couple moved to Paris where Alfred studied painting with Fernand Léger, and Betty began taking photographs.

Back in New York two years later, Betty was hired as a photo researcher for Time and Alfred became a practitioner of street photography capturing the activities of the lively metropolis, especially at night. His painting also reflects his interest in social realism and is executed in a sombre, deep-hued and expressionist Ashcan style.

In 1955 Edward Steichen selected his Aloneness at a Parade for the world-touring Museum of Modern Art exhibition The Family of Man, seen by 9 million visitors.

== Photojournalist ==
Aside from his personal work on the streets, Statler freelanced for important publications including the New York Times, LIFE, The Saturday Evening Post, and especially for TIME magazine for which as a staff photographer and, alongside his wife Betty, he portrayed artists and political figures such as Elie Wiesel, Duke Ellington, Rosa Parks, B. B. King, Theodore H. White, Andy Warhol, James Rosenquist, Igor Stravinsky, Walter Cronkite and novelist Shirley Jackson. Statler is an acknowledged contributor to some government publications of the 1970s. The couple also traveled in Europe, Southeast Asia, and China photographing for Time.

Alfred Statler died in New York City in 1984, survived by his wife Betty.
