= Robert Diament (photographer) =

Twentieth-century Russian photojournalist and war photographer

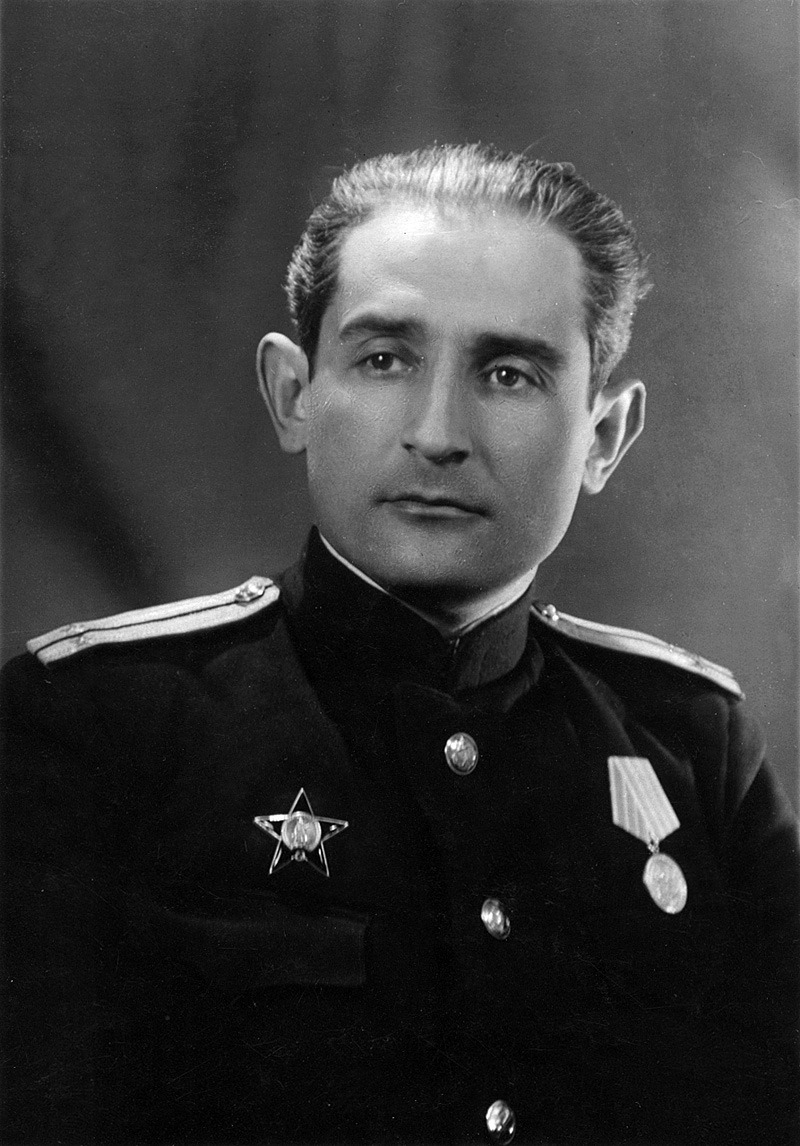
- Diament circa 1940
- Born: Роберт (Иосиф-Рафаил Львович) Диамент; March 2, 1907; Kiev, Russian Empire
- Died: March 22, 1987 (aged 80); Moscow, Russian SFSR, USSR
- Occupations: photojournalist, war correspondent
- Years active: c.1927–1980

Robert Joseph-Rafail Lvovich Diament (Russian: Роберт (Иосиф-Рафаил Львович) Диамент) (2 March 1907 – 22 March 1987) was a photojournalist and Soviet war photographer.

== Early life and career (1907-1941) ==
Robert Diament was born on 2 March 1907, in Kiev. After completing his education around 1925, he initially worked as an electrician. His interest in photography developed during this period, and by 1927 he was already working freelance for various Kiev newspapers.

In 1931, Diament joined the staff of the newspaper Molodoy Proletariy (Young Proletarian), and in 1934 he became a photo-correspondent for the newspaper Vesti TsIK USSR (News of the Central Executive Committee of the Ukrainian SSR).

In 1937 he was called to Moscow to work for the central press committee of the USSR. This move to the capital represented a significant advancement in his career, placing him among the prominent Soviet photojournalists of the era, including B. Ignatovich, D. Debabov, G. Zelma, I. Shagin, G. Petrusov, Max Alpert, and Arkady Shaikhet.

== War years and Northern Fleet service (1941-1945) ==
During the Great Patriotic War (1941–1945), photojournalists' work was published in one of the more than one hundred military newspapers, each of which employed at least one photojournalist. Werneke notes that in addition to documenting the war, some photographers also served in the military; Diament and Arkadi Shishkin served as privates in the infantry until 1944, while Georgi Lipskurov and N. Kubeev entered the militia, and Mark Markov-Grinberg served as a railway signalman.

Diament was assigned to document the combat operations of the Soviet Northern Fleet. His work encompassed photography on land, at sea, and in the air, including flights with torpedo bombers to intercept enemy convoys. Conway notes that Robert Diament "was the official Soviet Navy photographer, working mostly with the Northern Fleet, covering Arctic operations and focussing frequently upon the heroic aspects of the individual sailors involved" For instance, in 1942, Diament created one of his most famous photographs, a grinning portrait of marine landing force sailor Grigory Pashkov on the Rybachy Peninsula. This image became an iconic representation of Soviet sailors during the Great Patriotic War.

From 1942 to 1945, Diament served as head of the photo bureau of the Political Administration of the Northern Fleet. Despite his administrative position, he continued active work as a frontline photographer, participating in numerous dangerous military operations including submarine and destroyer missions. Photographing the firing of high-calibre guns aboard one of the Northern Fleet's most powerful warships when all other personnel on deck were protecting both ears from the blast, Diament could only cover his left ear as he fired his camera shutter with his right. The resulting concussion damaged his right eardrum, causing lifelong hearing problems.

In 1944, Diament participated in a special government mission to England, documenting the Lend-Lease operations that brought Allied ships and military equipment to Murmansk. Later that year, he took part in the Petsamo-Kirkenes offensive, a major Soviet military operation that liberated Soviet Arctic territories and northern Norway from German occupation.

== Post-war career and legacy (1945–1987) ==
After 1948, in the anti-semitic period of late Stalinism, Diament like many other Jewish photographers found few outlets for their work; one was the lesser-known magazine ‘Club and Art Activities’ (Клуб И художественная деятельность'), which employed him along with other under-employed but significant photojournalists Mark Markov-Grinberg, Evgenii Khaldei, Samara Gurarii and Yakov Khalip.

== Recognition and awards ==
For his service as a war photographer, Diament received significant military decorations including two Orders of the Red Star, and some sources also mention the Order of the Patriotic War (2nd class).

According to Grigory Chudakov, former editor-in-chief of Soviet Photo magazine and professor of photojournalism history at Moscow State University, Diament was distinguished from some of his more flamboyant contemporaries by his modesty, intelligence, and lack of self-promotion.

In 1955 Diament's 30.5 x 20.3 cm print of a smiling young couple admiring a well-swaddled baby, with a nurse looking on, in a sunny Russian hospital ward, appeared in the section 'Birth' of the globally-touring exhibition The Family of Man and its publication, where it is credited to him and the 'Moscow Journalists Club'.

Photographs by Diament are held in the International Center of Photography, the War and Peace Museum in Reykjavik and were exhibited at its opening in 2017, and have featured in various exhibitions on Soviet photography. The Northern Fleet Museum in Murmansk preserves negatives of more than 1,000 photographs of Northern soldiers (sailors, marines, and naval aviators) taken by Diament during the war years.

== Personal life ==
Robert Diament died on 22 March 1987, in Moscow, at the age of 80.

Diament had a son, Leonid Rafailovich Diament who, until his own death at 72 on 6 January 2011, managed his father's photographic archive and worked to preserve and promote his legacy.
