= The Family of Man =

1950s photography global exhibition

Softcover book catalogue of The Family of Man, designed by Leo Lionni, Piper photo by Eugene Harris. First issued for $1.00 in 1955 by Ridge Press, 4 million have sold and it is still in print.

The Family of Man was an ambitious exhibition of 503 photographs from 68 countries curated by Edward Steichen, the director of the New York City Museum of Modern Art's (MoMA) department of photography. According to Steichen, the exhibition represented the "culmination of his career". The title was taken from a line in a Carl Sandburg poem.

The Family of Man was exhibited in 1955 from January 24 to May 8 at the New York MoMA, then toured the world for eight years to record-breaking audience numbers. Commenting on its appeal, Steichen said, "The people in the audience looked at the pictures, and the people in the pictures looked back at them. They recognized each other." The physical collection is archived and displayed at Clervaux Castle in Edward Steichen's home country of Luxembourg, where he was born in 1879 in Bivange. It was first exhibited there in 1994 after restoration of the prints.

In 2003, the Family of Man photographic collection was added to UNESCO's Memory of the World Register in recognition of its historical value.

== Tours ==
=== United States ===
- 1955, 24 January – 8 May: Museum of Modern Art
- 1955, 22 June – 4 September: Minneapolis Institute of Art
- 1955, 7 October – 4 December: Dallas Museum of Art
- 1956, 24 January – 4 March: Cleveland Museum of Art
- 1956, 29 April – 20 May: Munson-Williams-Proctor Arts Institute
- 1956, 25 May – 15 July: Baltimore Museum of Art
- 1956, 4–25 June: Saint Louis Art Museum
- 1956, July: Corning Museum of Glass
- 1956, 9–30 July: George Eastman Museum
- 1956, 3–30 October: Museum of Fine Arts, Boston

=== World tour ===
The recently formed United States Information Agency was instrumental in touring the The Family of Man throughout the world.

It toured in five different versions for seven years, under the auspices of the Museum of Modern Art International Program making stops in thirty-seven countries on six continents. More than 10 million people viewed the exhibit, which is in excess of the largest audience for any other photographic exhibition. The photographs in the exhibition focused on the commonalities that bind people and cultures around the world, the exhibition serving as an expression of humanism in the decade following World War II.

Notably, it was not shown in Franco's Spain, in Vietnam, nor in China.

==== First European tour ====
Copy 1 (503 photo panels, 50 text panels) was organized by Edward Steichen. Duplication, with minor changes, of the exhibition presented at MoMA, January 24 – May 8, 1955 and subsequently circulated in the United States (1956–57). Commissioned by the USIA for circulation in Europe (circulated 1955–1962. Dispersed 1962). It was shown in:

| Germany | Berlin, Hochschule fur Bildende Kunst, Sept 17 – Oct 9, 1955 |
| Germany | Munich, Municipal Lenbach Gallery, Nov 19 – Dec 18, 1955 |
| Germany | Hamburg |
| Germany | Hanover |
| Germany | Frankfurt, Haus des Deutschen Kunsthandwerks, Oct 25 – Nov 30, 1958 |
| France | Paris, Musee National d'Art Moderne, Jan 20 – Feb 26, 1956 |
| Netherlands | Amsterdam, Stedelijk Museum, March 23 – April 29, 1956 |
| Netherlands | Rotterdam, Floriade, May–Aug 1960 |
| Belgium | Brussels, Palais de Beaux Arts, May 23 – July 1, 1956 |
| England | London, Royal Festival Hall, Aug 1–30, 1956 |
| Italy | Rome, Palazzo Venezia |
| Italy | Milan, Villa Communale |
| Yugoslavia | Belgrade, Kalamegdan Pavilion, Jan 25 – Feb 22, 1957 |
| Austria | Vienna, Kunstlerhaus, March 30 – April 28, 1957 |
| Denmark | Aarhus |
| Denmark | Aalborg |
| Denmark | Odense |
| Greece | Athens |
| Finland | Helsinki Taidehall |

==== Central America, India, Africa, Middle East ====
Copy 2, a duplicate of Copy 1 was commissioned by the USIA, circulated 1955–1963 and dispersed in 1963. It was shown in:

| Guatemala | Guatemala City, Palacio de Protocolo, Aug 24 – Sept 18, 1955 |
| Mexico | Mexico City, La Fragua- Conference of Central American States, Oct 21 – Nov 20, 1955 |
| India | Bombay, Jehangir Art Gallery, June 18 – July 15, 1956, ext. July 20 |
| India | Agra, University of Agra Library, Aug 31 – Sept 19, 1956 |
| India | New Delhi, Industries Fair Grounds-IX Session of General Conference of UNESCO, Nov–Dec 5, 1956 |
| India | Ahmedabad, Cultural Center, Jan 11 – Feb 1, 1957 |
| India | Calcutta, Ranji Stadium, March–April, 1957 |
| India | Madras, Madras University, June 10 – July 21, 1957 |
| India | Trivandurum, Sept 1–22, 1957 |
| South Korea | Seoul |
| Southern Rhodesia | Salisbury, Rhodes National Gallery, March–April, 1958 |
| Union of South Africa | Johannesburg, Gov't Pavilion-Rand Spring Show, Aug 30 – Sept 13, 1958 |
| Union of South Africa | Cape Town |
| Union of South Africa | Durban, Nov 11–25, 1958 |
| Union of South Africa | Pretoria, Jan 1959 Windhoek Port Elizabeth Uitenboge |
| Kenya | Nairobi, Oct 1959 |
| United Arab Republic | Cairo, Dec 1960 |
| United Arab Republic | Alexandria, Nov 1960 |
| United Arab Republic | Damascus |
| Afghanistan | Kabul |
| Iran | Tehran |

==== Second European tour ====
Copy 3, a duplicate of Copy 1 commissioned by the USIA. Circulated 1957–1965 and at Steichen's request, this version of the exhibition was presented to the Government of Luxembourg for permanent display at Common Market Headquarters, Luxembourg, 1965. Previously, it was shown in:

| Norway | Oslo, Museum of Applied Arts, Jan 15 – Feb 10, 1957 |
| Sweden | Stockholm, Lilijevalchs Konsthall, March 22 – April 7, 1957 |
| Sweden | Gothenburg, Svenska Massan/Gothenborg Fair, June 8–23, 1957 |
| Sweden | Halsingborg, Halsinborg Exposition, Jul 12 – Aug 18, 1957 |
| Iceland | Reykjavík, Sept–Oct, 1957 |
| Denmark | Copenhagen, Charlottenborg Gallery, Nov 22 – Dec 26, 1957 |
| Switzerland | Zürich, Museum of Design, Jan 25 – March 2, 1958 |
| Switzerland | Basel, Kunsthalle, March 8 – April 16, 1958 |
| Switzerland | Geneva, Musee Rath, April 16 – May 1958 |
| Switzerland | St. Gallen, Aug–Sep, 1958 Bern, Jun–Aug, 1958 |
| Yugoslavia | Zagreb, Oct–Nov, 1958 |
| Italy | Milan, Villa Communale, Jan–Feb, 1959 |
| Italy | Turin |
| Italy | Florence |
| Poland | Warsaw, National Theatre, Sept 18 – Oct 21, 1959 |
| Poland | Wrocław, Museum of Slask, Nov 8 – Dec 27, 1959 |
| Poland | Wałbrzych, Jan 1 – Feb 7, 1960 |
| Poland | Jelenia Góra, Feb 14–28, 1960 |
| Poland | Kraków, March 1–15, 1960 |
| Poland | Poznań, April 9 – May 1, 1960 |
| Poland | Dąbrowa Górnicza, May 10–31, 1960 |
| Belgium | Ghent |
| Luxembourg | Musee de l'Etat, July 23, 1966 |

==== South America, Australia and South-East Asia ====
Copy 4, a duplicate of Copy 1. Commissioned by the U.S.I.A. Circulated 1957–62. Dispersed 1962. It was shown in:

| Cuba | Havana, Museo Nacional Palacio de Belas Artes, March 6 – April, 1957 |
| Venezuela | Caracas, University of Caracas, July 5–30, 1957 |
| Colombia | Bogotá, Oct–Dec, 1957 |
| Chile | Santiago, University of Chile, Jan–Feb, 1958 |
| Uruguay | Montevideo, April 12–27, 1958 |
| Australia | Melbourne, Preston Motors Show Room, opened February 23, 1959 |
| Australia | Sydney, David Jones department store, opened April 6, 1959 |
| Australia | Brisbane, John Hicks Showrooms, May 18 – June 13, 1959 |
| Australia | Adelaide, Myer Emporium, June 29 – July 31, 1959 |
| Laos | Bientani, That Luang National shrine – That Luang Festival |
| Indonesia | Jakarta |

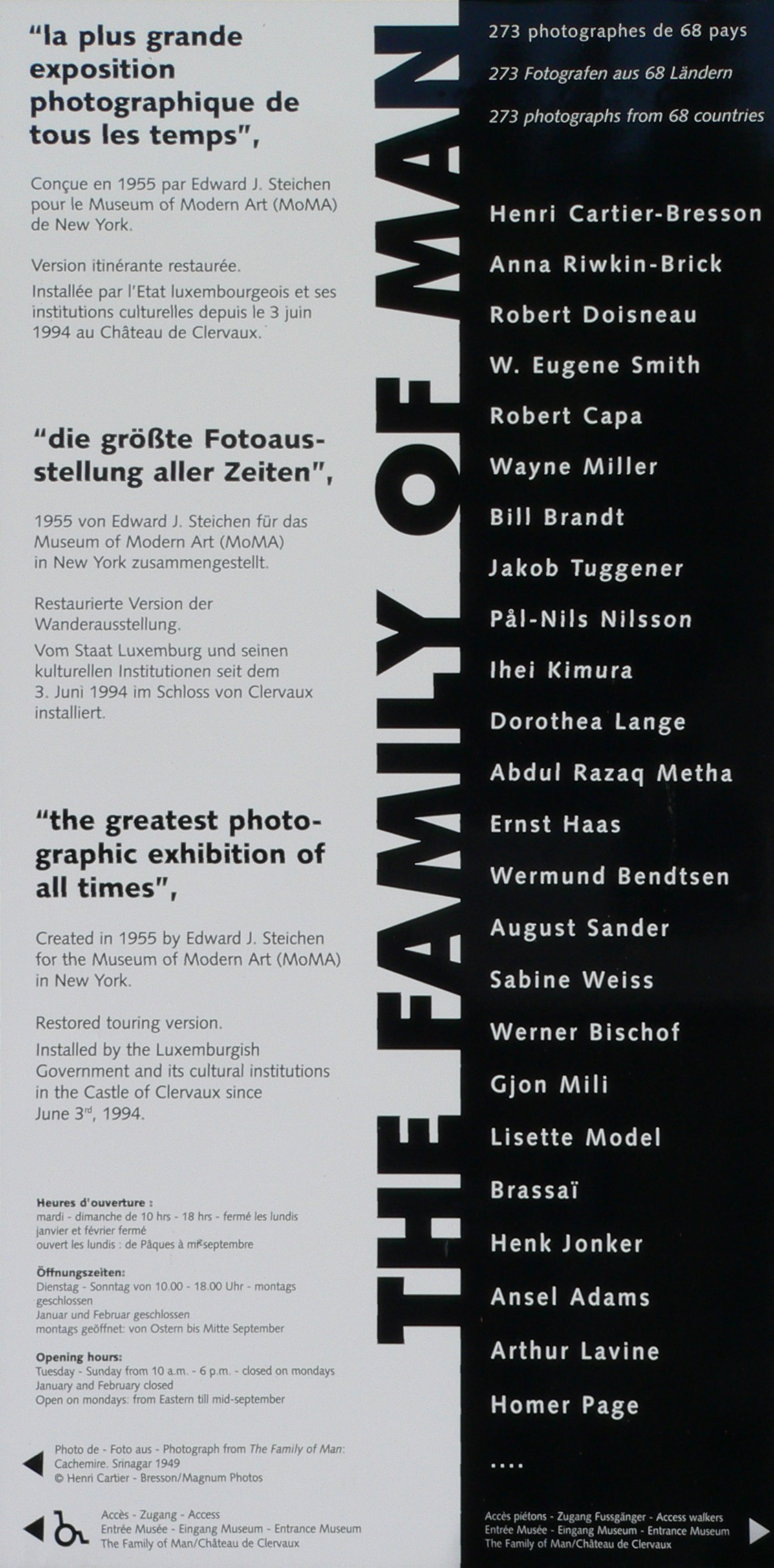
Poster for the Exhibition The Family of Man in three languages

==== Middle East ====
A revised version of the original shown at MoMA 1955. Circulated in the United States, 1957–59, then acquired by the USIA for circulation abroad (1957–58; dispersed 1958), and shown in Tel Aviv, Israel and Beirut, Lebanon

==== Japan ====
In 1956, The Family of Man was exhibited at Nihonbashi Takashimaya in Japan (organised with Nikkei Inc.). The version sent to Japan did not include the large black-and-white photograph of a mushroom cloud that appeared in other travelling versions of the exhibition. Steichen explained the removal by saying he consistently avoided specific historical events, believing they distorted the exhibition's universal message unless presented in full context. Takenaka further specifies that in Tokyo that image was replaced by a mural-sized photograph of Nagasaki taken in Nagasaki on 10 August 1945 by Yōsuke Yamahata who challenged Steichen's reasoning, asking whether the atomic bombing could really be dismissed as merely a "specific event." His was accompanied by four photographs of survivors (including the mother and child, the boy carrying his injured brother, the father with his baby, and the waiting girl), showing the human devastation caused by the bomb rather than the explosion itself. Steichen and the Japanese executive committee agreed to add 60 Japanese photographs, including the five Yamahata photographs of the Nagasaki bombing, one at mural size, to make the Japanese presentation distinctive.

O'Brian argues that Steichen's broader curatorial philosophy rejected historically specific, or news, images of suffering, and that the exhibition's universal humanism ultimately aligned with post-war American policies that downplayed the human consequences of Hiroshima and Nagasaki. Miller, then photographing in the Pacific, visited Hiroshima in October 1945 and photographed survivors, but none was included in The Family of Man, despite thirteen of his pictures of other subjects being selected. Marine sergeant Joe O’Donnell's photographs in Hiroshima and Nagasaki were also excluded.

O'Brian also notes that when Emperor Hirohito visited the Tokyo exhibition, Yamahata's photographs were first curtained off and then removed entirely, events which Takenaka dates; the exhibition opened on 21 March 1956; two days later, during Emperor Shōwa's visit, the wall containing the Nagasaki photographs was hidden behind a white curtain. Shortly afterwards, all but one of the Nagasaki photographs (the boy holding a rice ball) were removed from the exhibition. On 23 April 1956, nine prominent Japanese photographers, editors and critics, including Yōnosuke Natori, Tsutomu Watanabe and Koen Shigemori, issued a joint protest, arguing that removing the photographs without explanation threatened freedom of expression and the public's right to see them. Newspapers protested the action and published photographs of the original display before removal.

==== Soviet Union ====
Copy 5: Following a bilateral agreement between the US and USSR, in 1959 the American National Exhibition was to be held in Moscow and the Soviets were to have had the use of New York City's Coliseum. This Moscow trade fair at Sokolniki Park was the scene of Soviet Premier Nikita Khrushchev and United States Vice President Richard Nixon's 'Kitchen Debate' over the relative merits of communism and capitalism.

The Family of Man was a late inclusion that had not been originally envisaged in MoMA's itinerary. With a grant to the Museum of $15,000 (less than half of what it requested) and funding from the plastics industry for the radical pre-fabricated translucent pavilion design to house it, a fifth copy of the show was salvaged from what was left of the Beirut and Scandinavia showings, augmented with new prints.

In Moscow, in the context of a trade show 'supermarket' meant to demonstrate lavish consumerism, and a multimedia display assembled by Charles Eames, the collection's overtones of peace and human brotherhood symbolized a lifting of the imminent threat of an atomic war for Soviet citizens in the midst of the Cold War. This meaning seemed to be grasped especially by Soviet students and intellectuals. Recognising the importance of the Moscow exhibition as "the high spot of the project", Steichen attended its opening and made copious photographs of the event.

==== Clervaux Castle, Luxembourg ====
The original prints from Copy 3 exhibited in the permanent collection at Clervaux Castle in Luxembourg have been restored twice, once in the 1990s and more comprehensively during a closure of the museum in the years 2010–2013.

== An innovative exhibit ==
The physical installation and layout of the Family of Man exhibition were designed to enable the visitor to view it as if it were a photo-essay about human development and cycles of life, that affirmed a common human identity and destiny against the contemporary Cold War threats of nuclear war.

Architect Paul Rudolph designed a series of temporary walls set amongst the existing structural columns, which guided visitors past the images, which he described as "telling a story", encouraging them to pause at those that attracted their attention. His layout and display features were adapted as much as possible to the international venues, which varied considerably from the original space at MoMA.

Open spaces within the layout encouraged viewers' interaction; to choose their own path through the exhibition, and to gather to discuss it. The layout and placement of prints and their variation in size encouraged the bodily participation of the audience, who would have to bend down to examine a small print displayed below eye level and then to step back to view a mural image, and to negotiate both narrow and expansive spaces.

The prints range in size from 24 cm × 36 cm (9.4 in × 14.2 in) to 300 cm × 400 cm (120 in × 160 in) and were made, in the case of the contemporary images, by assistant Jack Jackson, from the negative supplied to Steichen by each photographer. Also included were copies of historical images, for example a Mathew Brady civil war documentation, and a Lewis Carroll portrait. Blown-up, often mural scale images, angled, floated or curved, some inset into other floor-to-ceiling prints, even displayed on the ceiling (a canted view of a silhouetted axeman and tree), on posts like finger-boards (in the final room), and the floor (for a Ring o' Roses series), were grouped together according to diverse themes. Repeated prints of Eugene Harris' portrait of a Peruvian flute-player formed a coda, or acted as 'Pied Piper' to the audience, in the opinion of some reviewers, and according to Steichen himself, expressed "a little bit of mischief, but much sweetness—that's the song of life." Lighting intensities varied throughout the series of ten rooms in order to set the mood.

The exhibition opened with an entrance archway papered with a blow-up of a crowd in London by Pat English framing Wyn Bullock's Chinese landscape of sunlight on water into which was inset an image of a truncated nude of a pregnant woman in an evocation of creation myths. Subjects then ranged in sequence from lovers, to childbirth, to household, and careers, then to death and, on a topical and portentous note, the hydrogen bomb (an image from LIFE magazine of the test detonation Mike, Operation Ivy, Enewetak Atoll, October 31, 1952) which was the only full-colour image; a room-filling backlit 1.8 m × 2.43 m (5.9 ft × 8.0 ft) Eastman transparency, replaced for the travelling version of the show with a different view of the same explosion in black and white.

Finally, full cycle, visitors returned once more to children in a room in which the last picture was W. Eugene Smith's iconic 1946 A Walk to Paradise Garden. As the centrepiece of the exhibition a hanging sculptural installation of photographs including Vito Fiorenza's Sicilian family group and Carl Mydans' of a Japanese family (both from nations which were recent enemies of the Allies in WW2), another from Bechuanaland by Nat Farbman and a rural family of the United States by Nina Leen, encouraged circulation to view double-sided prints and invited reflection on the universal nature of the family beyond cultural differences.

Photos were chosen according to their capacity to communicate a story, or a feeling, that contributed to the overarching narrative. Each grouping of images builds upon the next, creating an intricate story of human life. The design of the exhibition built on trade displays and Steichen's 1945 Power In The Pacific exhibition which was designed by George Kidder Smith for MoMA, Steichen's commissioning of Herbert Bayer for the presentation of his curatorship of other exhibitions and his own long history of initiation of innovative exhibits dating back to his association with Gallery 291 early in the century. In 1963 Steichen elaborated on the special opportunities offered by the exhibition format;

In the cinema and television, the image is revealed at a pace set by the director. In the exhibition gallery, the visitor sets his own pace. He can go forward and then retreat or hurry along according to his own impulse and mood as these are stimulated by the exhibition. In the creation of such an exhibition, resources are brought into play that are not available elsewhere. The contrast in scale of images, the shifting of focal points, the intriguing perspective of long- and short- range visibility with the images to come being glimpsed beyond the images at hand—all these permit the spectator an active participation that no other form of visual communication can give.

== Texts used in the exhibition and book ==
The enlarged prints by the multiple photographers were displayed without explanatory captions, and instead were intermingled with quotations by, among others, James Joyce, Thomas Paine, Lillian Smith, and William Shakespeare, chosen by photographer and social activist Dorothy Norman. Carl Sandburg, Steichen's brother-in-law, 1951 recipient of the Pulitzer Prize for Poetry and known for his biography of Abraham Lincoln, inspired the title of the exhibition with a line from his poem The Long Shadow of Lincoln: A Litany (1944);

There is dust alive
With dreams of the Republic,
With dreams of the family of man
Flung wide on a shrinking globe;

It was Sandburg who added an accompanying poetic commentary also displayed as text panels throughout the exhibition and included in the publication, of which the following are samples;

There is only one man in the world and his name is All Men. There is only one woman in the world and her name is All Women. There is only one child in the world and the child's name is All Children.

People! flung wide and far, born into toil, struggle, blood and dreams, among lovers, eaters, drinkers, workers, loafers, fighters, players, gamblers. Here are ironworkers, bridge men, musicians, sandhogs, miners, builders of huts and skyscrapers, jungle hunters, landlords, and the landless, the loved and the unloved, the lonely and abandoned, the brutal and the compassionate — one big family hugging close to the ball of Earth for its life and being. Everywhere is love and love-making, weddings and babies from generation to generation keeping the Family of Man alive and continuing.

If the human face is "the masterpiece of God" it is here then in a thousand fateful registrations. Often the faces speak that words can never say. Some tell of eternity and others only the latest tattings. Child faces of blossom smiles or mouths of hunger are followed by homely faces of majesty carved and worn by love, prayer and hope, along with others light and carefree as thistledown in a late summer wing. Faces have land and sea on them, faces honest as the morning sun flooding a clean kitchen with light, faces crooked and lost and wondering where to go this afternoon or tomorrow morning. Faces in crowds, laughing and windblown leaf faces, profiles in an instant of agony, mouths in a dumbshow mockery lacking speech, faces of music in gay song or a twist of pain, a hate ready to kill, or calm and ready-for-death faces. Some of them are worth a long look now and deep contemplation later.

== Book ==
Jerry Mason (1913–1991) contemporaneously edited and published a complementary book of the exhibition through Maco Magazine Corporation, formed for the purpose in 1955 in partnership with Fred Sammis. It was the first time hard-cover and soft-cover editions were published simultaneously. The book, which has never been out of print, was designed by Leo Lionni (May 5, 1910 – October 11, 1999). Many of Lionni's book covers, like that of The Family of Man, incorporate playful modernist collages of apparently cut or torn coloured paper, which he repeats, for example in his 1962 design for The American Character and for children's books, an aesthetic also used in exhibitions from his parallel career as a fine artist. The publication was reproduced in a variety of formats (most popularly a soft-cover volume) in the 1950s, and reprinted in large format for its 40th anniversary, and in its various editions has sold more than four million copies. Most images from the exhibition were reproduced with an introduction by Carl Sandburg, whose prologue reads, in part:

The first cry of a baby in Chicago, or Zamboango, in Amsterdam or Rangoon, has the same pitch and key, each saying, "I am! I have come through! I belong! I am a member of the Family. Many the babies and grownup here from photographs made in sixty-eight nations round our planet Earth. You travel and see what the camera saw. The wonder of human mind, heart wit and instinct is here. You might catch yourself saying, 'I'm not a stranger here.'

However, an omission from the book, highly significant and contrary to Steichen's stated pacifist aim, was the image of a hydrogen bomb test explosion; audiences of the time were highly sensitive to the threat of universal nuclear annihilation. In place of the huge colour transparency to which a space was devoted in the MoMA exhibition, and the black-and-white mural print that toured countries other than Japan, only this quotation of Bertrand Russell's anti-nuclear warning, in white type on a black page, appears in the book;

[...] The best authorities are unanimous in saying that a war with hydrogen bombs is quite likely to put an end to the human race [...] There will be universal death—sudden for only a minority, but for the majority a slow torture of disease and disintegration.

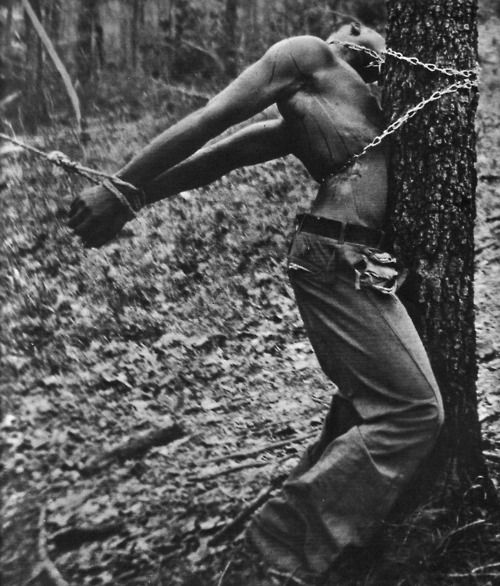
Robert McDaniels, lynched April 13, 1937, in Duck Hill, Mississippi

Absent also from the book, and removed by week eleven of the initial MoMA exhibition, was the distressing photograph of the aftermath of a lynching, of a dead young African American man, tied to a tree with his bound arms tautly tethered with a rope that stretches out of frame.

For most purchasers, this was their first encounter with a book that gave priority to the photographic image over text.

In 2015, to mark the sixtieth anniversary of the inaugural exhibition, MoMA reissued the book as a hardcover edition, with the original jacket design from 1955 (albeit without the signature of designer Leo Lionni) and duotone printing from new copies of all of the photographs.

== Photographers ==
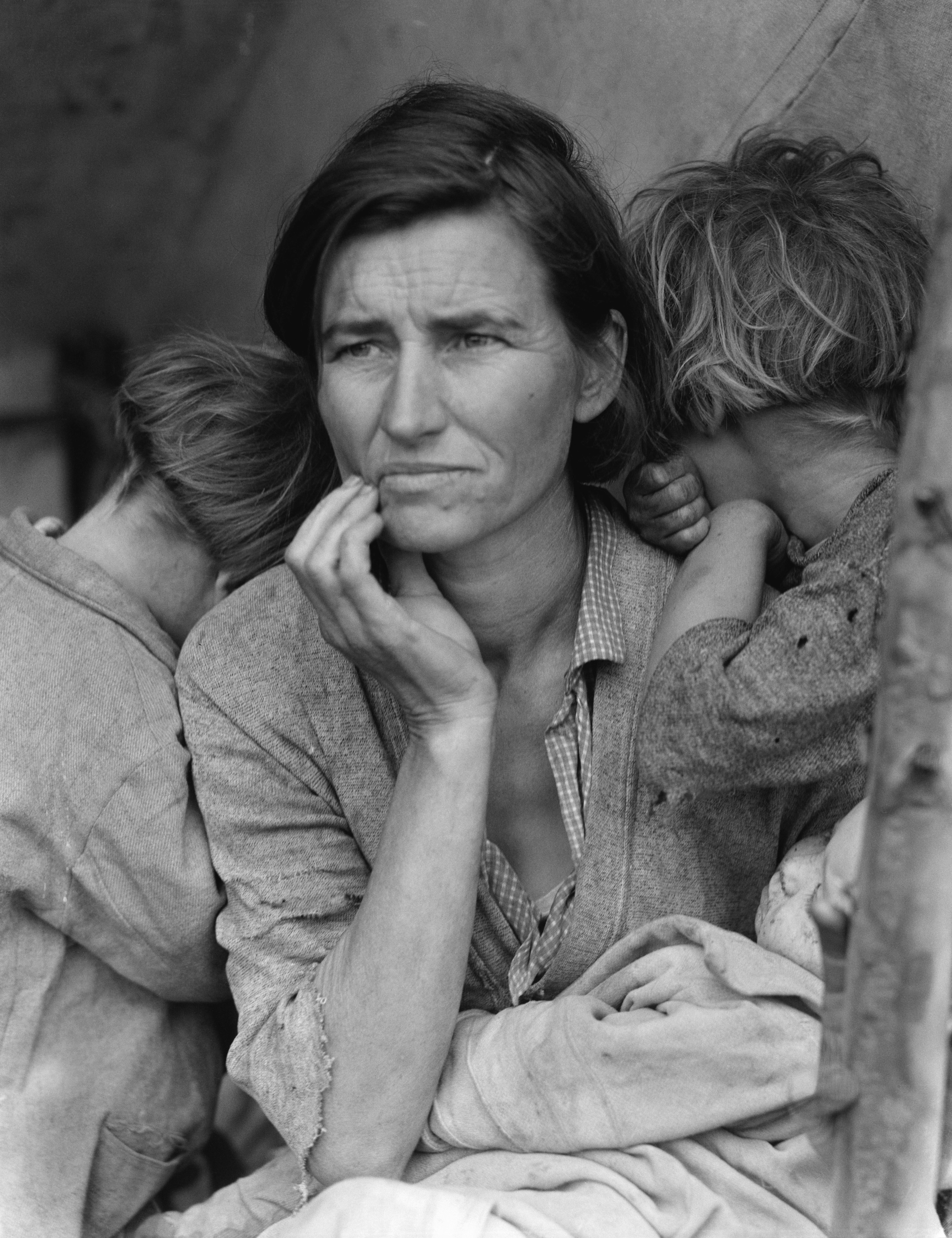
Migrant Mother (1936), Dorothea Lange

Steichen's stated objective was to draw attention, visually, to the universality of human experience and the role of photography in its documentation. The exhibition brought together 503 photos from 68 countries, the work of 273 photographers (163, or 59.3% of whom were Americans) which, with 70 European photographers, means that the ensemble represents a primarily Western viewpoint. That forty were women photographers can in some part be attributed to Joan Miller's contribution to the selection, and to Dorothea Lange who assisted her friend Edward Steichen in recruiting photographers. She contacted her FSA and Life connections who in turn promoted the project to their colleagues. In 1953 she circulated a letter; "A Summons to Photographers All Over the World", calling on them to;

show Man to Man across the world. Here we hope to reveal by visual images Man's dreams and aspirations, his strength, his despair under evil. If photography can bring these things to life, this exhibition will be created in a spirit of passionate and devoted faith in Man. Nothing short of that will do.

The letter then listed topics that photographs might cover and these categories are reflected in the show's final arrangement. Lange's work features in the exhibition.

Steichen and his team drew heavily on Life archives for the photographs used in the final exhibition, seventy-five by Abigail Solomon-Godeau's count, more than 20% of the total (111 out of 503), while some were obtained from other magazines; Vogue was represented by nine, Fortune (7), Argosy (seven, all by Homer Page), Ladies Home Journal (4); Popular Photography (3), and others Seventeen, Glamour, Harper's Bazaar, Time, the British Picture Post and the French Du, by one. From picture agencies American, Soviet, European and international, which also supplied the above magazines, came about 13% of the content, with Magnum represented by 43 of the pictures, Rapho with thirteen, Black Star with ten, Pix with seven, Sovfoto, which had three and Brackman with four, with around half a dozen other agencies represented by one photo.

Steichen travelled internationally to collect images, through 11 European countries including France, Switzerland, Austria and Germany. In total, Steichen procured 300 images from European photographers, many from the humanist group, which were first shown in the Post-War European Photography exhibition at the Museum of Modern Art in 1953. Due to the incorporation of this body of work into the 1955 The Family of Man exhibition, Post-War European Photography is thought of as a preview to The Family of Man. The international tour of the definitive 1955 exhibition was sponsored by the now defunct United States Information Agency, whose aim was to counter Cold War propaganda by creating a better world image of American policies and values.

Though most photographers were represented by a single picture, some had several included; Robert Doisneau, Homer Page, Helen Levitt, Manuel Álvarez Bravo, Bill Brandt, Édouard Boubat, Harry Callahan (with two), Nat Farbman (five of Bechuanaland, and more from Life), Robert Frank (four), Bert Hardy and Robert Harrington (three). Steichen himself supplied five photos, while his assistant Wayne Miller had thirteen chosen; by far the greatest number.

The following lists notable participating photographers, excluding those with no professional or exhibiting history (see original 1955 MoMA checklist):

- Ansel Adams (USA)
- Max Alpert (USSR)
- Erich Andres (Germany)
- Emmy Andriesse (Netherlands)
- Diane and Allan Arbus (U.S.A., Vogue)
- Eve Arnold (USA)
- Richard Avedon (USA)
- Ruth-Marion Baruch (USA)
- Hugh Bell (U.S.A.)
- Wermund Bendtsen (Denmark)
- Paul Berg (USA)
- Lou Bernstein (USA)
- John Bertolino(Italy/USA)
- Eva Besnyö (Netherlands)
- Werner Bischof (Switzerland)
- Maria Bordy (Russia, UN)
- Édouard Boubat (France)
- Margaret Bourke-White (USA)
- Mathew Brady (USA)
- Bill Brandt (UK)
- Brassai (France)
- Lola Álvarez Bravo (Mexico)
- Manuel Álvarez Bravo (Mexico)
- Josef Breitenbach (Brackman Associates) (Germany, USA)
- David Brooks (Canada)
- Reva Brooks (Canada)
- Ernst Brunner (Switzerland)
- Esther Bubley (USA)
- Wynn Bullock (USA)
- Shirley Burden (USA)
- Rudolf Busler (Germany)
- Harry Callahan (USA)
- Cornell Capa (USA)
- Robert Capa
- Robert Carrington
- Lewis Carroll (UK)
- Henri Cartier-Bresson (France)
- Ted Castle (USA)
- Marcos Chamúdez (Chile)
- Al Chang (USA)
- Ed Clark (USA)
- Hermann Claasen (Germany)
- Jerry Cooke (USA)
- Roy DeCarava (USA)
- Loomis Dean (USA)
- Jack Delano (USA)
- Nick De Morgoli
- J. De Pietro
- Robert Diament (USSR)
- Robert Doisneau (France)
- Nell Dorr (USA)
- Nora Dumas (French)
- David Douglas Duncan (USA)
- Alfred Eisenstaedt (USA)
- Elliott Erwitt (USA)
- J. R. Eyerman (USA)
- Sam Falk (USA)
- Nat Farbman (USA)
- Eleanor Fast (USA)
- Louis Faurer (USA)
- Ed Feingersh (USA)
- Andreas Feininger (USA)
- Vito Fiorenza (Italy)
- Leopold Fischer (Austria)
- John Florea (USA)
- Robert Frank (USA)
- Toni Frissell (USA)
- Unosuke Gamou (Japan)
- William Garnett (USA)
- Herbert Gehr (Edmund Bert Gerard) (USA)
- Guy Gillette (USA)
- Burt Glinn (USA)
- Fritz Goro (USA)
- Allan Grant (USA)
- Farrell Grehan (USA)
- René Groebli (Switzerland)
- Mildred Grossman (USA)
- Karl W. Gullers (Sweden)
- Ernst Haas (USA)
- Peter W. Haberlin (Switzerland)
- Hideo Haga (Japan)
- Otto Hagel (USA)
- Robert Halmi (Hungary)
- Hiroshi Hamaya(Japan)
- Hans Hammarskiöld (Sweden)
- Hella Hammid (USA)
- Bert Hardy (UK)
- Eugene Harris (USA)
- Caroline Hebbe-Hammarskiöld (Sweden)
- Paul Himmel (USA)
- Frank Horvat (Italy)
- Willi Huttig (Germany)
- Yasuhiro Ishimoto (Japan)
- Izis (France)
- Fenno Jacobs (USA)
- Raymond Jacobs (USA)
- Ronny Jaques (Canada)
- Bob Jakobsen (USA)
- Nico Jesse (Netherlands)
- Constantin Joffé
- Carter Jones (USA)
- Henk Jonker (Netherlands)
- Victor Jorgensen (USA)
- Clemens Kalischer (USA)
- Simpson Kalisher (USA)
- Consuelo Kanaga (USA)
- Dmitri Kessel (USA)
- Keystone Press (Agency, USA)
- Ihei Kimura (Japan)
- Martha Kitchen (USA)
- Nikolai Kolli (USSR)
- Torkel Korling (USA)
- Nikolai Kozlovsky (USSR)
- Ewing Krainin (USA)
- Herman Kreider (USA)
- Walter B. Lane
- Dorothea Lange (USA)
- Harry Lapow (USA
- Lisa Larsen (USA)
- Alma Lavenson (USA)
- Arthur Lavine (USA)
- Russell Lee (USA)
- Nina Leen (Russia/USA)
- Laurence Le Guay (Australia)
- Henri Leighton (USA)
- Arthur Leipzig (USA)
- Charles Leirens (Belgium)
- Gita Lenz (USA)
- Leon Levinstein (USA)
- Helen Levitt (USA)
- Margery Lewis (USA)
- Sol Libsohn (USA)
- David Linton
- Herbert List (Germany)
- Jacob Lofman (Poland/USA)
- Hans Malmberg (Sweden)
- G.H. Metcalf
- Gjon Mili (Albania/USA)
- Frank Miller (USA)
- Joan Miller (USA)
- Lee Miller (USA)
- Wayne Miller (USA)
- May Mirin (USA)
- Lisette Model (Austria/USA)
- Peter Moeschlin (Switzerland)
- David Moore (Australia)
- Barbara Morgan (USA)
- Hedda Morrison (Germany)
- Ralph Morse (USA)
- Robert Mottar (USA)
- Carl Mydans (USA)
- David Myers (USA)
- Fritz Neugass (Germany/USA)
- Lennart Nilsson (Sweden)
- Pål Nils Nilsson (Sweden)
- Emil Obrovsky (Austria)
- Yoichi Okamoto (USA)
- Cas Oorthuys (Netherlands)
- Ruth Orkin (USA)
- Don Ornitz (USA)
- Eiju Otaki
- Homer Page (USA)
- Marion Palfi (USA)
- Gordon Parks (USA)
- Rondal Partridge (USA)
- Irving Penn (USA)
- Carl Perutz (USA)
- John Phillips (Algeria/USA)
- Leonti Planskoy (Russia/UK)
- Ray Platnick (USA)
- Fred Plaut (Germany)
- Rudolf Pollak (Germany)
- Rapho Guilumette (Agency, France)
- Gottfried Rainer (Austria)
- Daniel J. Ransohoff (USA)
- Bill Rauhauser (USA)
- Satyajit Ray (India)
- Anna Riwkin-Brick (Russia/Sweden)
- George Rodger (Great Britain)
- Willy Ronis (France)
- Annelise Rosenberg
- Hannes Rosenberg
- August Sander (Germany)
- Walter Sanders (USA)
- Sanford H. Roth (USA)
- Gotthard Schuh
- Éric Schwab (France)
- Bob Schwalberg (USA)
- Kurt Severin (Germany/USA)
- David Seymour (Poland)
- Ben Shahn (Lithuania/USA)
- Musya S. Sheeler (USA)
- Li Shu (China)
- George Silk (New Zealand/USA)
- Bradley Smith (USA)
- Ian Smith (UK)
- W. Eugene Smith (USA)
- Howard Sochurek (USA)
- Peter Stackpole (USA)
- Alfred Statler (USA)
- Gitel Steed (USA)
- Edward Steichen (Luxembourg/USA)
- Richard Steinheimer (USA)
- Ezra Stoller (USA)
- Lou Stoumen (USA)
- George Strock (USA)
- Constance Stuart (South Africa)
- Étienne Sved (Hungary)
- Suzanne Szasz (USA)
- Yoshisuke Terao
- Gustavo Thorlichen (Argentina)
- Charles Trieschmann (USA)
- François Tuefferd (France)
- Jakob Tuggener (Switzerland)
- Allan Turoff
- Doris Ulmann (USA)
- Alexander Uzylan (U.S.S.R.)
- Ed van der Elsken (Netherlands)
- William Vandivert
- Pierre Verger (France/Brazil)
- Ike Vern (USA)
- 'Véro' (Werner Rosenberg) (France)
- Roman Vishniac (Russia/USA)
- Carmel Vitullo (USA)
- Edward Wallowitch (USA)
- Todd Webb (USA)
- Sabine Weiss (Switzerland)
- Edward Weston (USA)
- Bob Willoughby (USA)
- Garry Winogrand (USA)
- Arthur Witman (USA)
- Jasper Wood (USA)
- Yosuke Yamahata (Japan)
- Shizuo Yamamoto

== Reception and criticism ==
Photography, said Steichen, "communicates equally to everybody throughout the world. It is the only universal language we have, the only one requiring no translation." When the exhibition opened most reviewers—and Eleanor Roosevelt who wrote in her column My Day, "I could not have enjoyed anything more .... "—loved the show. Some embraced the idea of this 'universal language', as with Don Langer's response in the New York Herald Tribune:" It can truly be said that with this show, photography has come of age as a medium of expression and as an art form," and even The New York Times art critic Aline B. Saarinen, in an article titled "The Camera versus the Artist" asked "Has photography replaced painting as the great visual art of our time?" Others lauded Steichen as a sort of author and the exhibition as a text or essay. Photographer Barbara Morgan, in Aperture, connected this concept with the show's universalising theme;

In comprehending the show the individual himself is also enlarged, for these photographs are not photographs only—they are also phantom images of our co-citizens; this woman into whose photographic eyes I now look is perhaps today weeding her family rice paddy, or boiling a fish in coconut milk. Can you look at the polygamist family group and imagine the different norms that make them live happily in their society which is so unlike—yet like—our own? Empathy with these hundreds of human beings truly expands our sense of values.

Expressing the contrary view, Cora Alsberg and George Wright, partners and freelance writers, co-wrote a response, "One Family's Opinion", in the same Aperture issue devoted to the show, that;

Any really great photographer, like a great painter, creates his own visual universe...You can distinguish a Gene Smith from a Cartier Bresson without a signature. You can instantly recognize an Adams, a Weston, a Laughlin print, or that of any mature worker whose previous work you've seen...But mixed with others in a show, he surrenders this individuality-just as a writer might if he gave permission for single paragraphs to be quoted by an editor in any sequence and in any context.

Hilton Kramer, then managing editor of the magazine Arts, asserted a negative view, one taken up by more recent critics, that The Family of Man was a;

self-congratulatory means for obscuring the urgency of real problems under a blanket of ideology which takes for granted the essential goodness, innocence, and moral superiority of the international 'little man; 'the man in the street: the active, disembodied hero of a world-view which regards itself as superior to mere politics.

Roland Barthes too was quick to criticise the exhibition as being an example of his concept of myth—the dramatization of an ideological message. In his book Mythologies, published in France a year after the exhibition in Paris in 1956, Barthes declared it to be a product of "conventional humanism", a collection of photographs in which everyone lives and "dies in the same way everywhere." "Just showing pictures of people being born and dying tells us, literally, nothing."

Many other noteworthy reactions, both positive and negative, have been proffered in social/cultural studies and as part of artistic and historical texts. The earliest critics of the show were, ironically, photographers, who felt that Steichen had downplayed individual talent and discouraged the public from accepting photography as art. The show was the subject of an entire issue of Aperture; "The Controversial Family of Man." Walker Evans disdained its "human familyhood [and] bogus heartfeeling" Phoebe Lou Adams complained that "If Mr. Steichen's well-intentioned spell doesn't work, it can only be because he has been so intent on [Mankind's] physical similarities that...he has utterly forgotten that a family quarrel can be as fierce as any other kind."

Some critics complained that Steichen merely transposed the magazine photo-essay from page to museum wall; in 1955 Rollie McKenna likened the experience to a ride through a funhouse, while Russell Lynes in 1973 wrote that Family of Man "was a vast photo-essay, a literary formula basically, with much of the emotional and visual quality provided by sheer bigness of the blow-ups and its rather sententious message sharpened by juxtaposition of opposites—wheat fields and landscapes of boulders, peasants and patricians, a sort of 'look at all these nice folks in all these strange places who belong to this family.'" Jacob Deschin, photography critic for The New York Times, wrote, "the show is essentially a picture story to support a concept and an editorial achievement rather than an exhibition of photography."

From an optic of struggle, echoing Barthes, Susan Sontag in On Photography accused Steichen of sentimentalism and oversimplification: "... they wished, in the 1950s, to be consoled and distracted by a sentimental humanism. ... Steichen's choice of photographs assumes a human condition or a human nature shared by everybody." Directly quoting Barthes, without acknowledgement, she continues; "By purporting to show that individuals are born, work, laugh, and die everywhere in the same way, The Family of Man denies the determining weight of history—of genuine and historically embedded differences, injustices, and conflicts."

Allan Sekula in "The Traffic in Photographs" (1981) posits The Family of Man as a capitalist cultural tool levering world domination at the height of the Cold War; "My main point here is that The Family of Man, more than any other single photographic project, was a massive and ostentatious bureaucratic attempt to universalize photographic discourse," an exercise in hegemony which, "In the foreign showings of the exhibition, arranged by the United States Information Agency and co-sponsoring corporations like Coca-Cola, the discourse was explicitly that of American multinational capital and government—the new global management team–cloaked in the familiar and musty garb of patriarchy." Sekula revises and expands this notion in relation to his ideas about economic globalisation in an article in October entitled "Between the Net and the Deep Blue Sea: Rethinking the Traffic in Photographs".

Others attacked the show as an attempt to paper over problems of race and class, including Christopher Phillips, John Berger, and Abigail Solomon-Godeau, who in her 2004 essay, while describing herself as among "those who intellectually came of age as postmodernists, poststructuralists, feminists, Marxists, antihumanists, or, for that matter, atheists, this little essay of Barthes's efficiently demonstrated the problem—indeed the bad faith—of sentimental humanism", concedes that "as photography exhibitions go, it is perhaps the ultimate "bad object" for progressives or critical theorists", but "good to think with". Many of these critics, including Solomon-Godeau who openly admits it, had not viewed the exhibition but were working from the published catalogue which notably excludes the initially shown but soon removed picture of the lynched Robert McDaniels and the image of the atomic explosion as the apex at the end of the exhibition.

While The Family of Man was being exhibited there at its last venue in 1959 several pictures were torn down in Moscow by the Nigerian student Theophilus Neokonkwo. An Associated Press report of the time suggests that his actions were in a protest at colonialist attitudes to black races.

Conversely, other critics defended the exhibition, referring to the political and cultural environment in which it was staged. Among these were Fred Turner, Eric J. Sandeen, Blake Stimson and Walter L. Hixson. Most recently in 2018, a compilation of essays by contemporary critics supported by newly translated writings contemporary to the exhibition's appearances collected and edited by Gerd Hurm, Anke Reitz and Shamoon Zamir presents a revised reading of Steichen's motivations and audience reactions, and a reassessment of the validity of Roland Barthes' influential criticism in "La grande famille des hommes" in his Mythologies.

Samuel R. Delany in a 2003 essay, "Velocities of Change", provides a detailed analysis of some of the images, and contrasts Barthes' and Jacques Barzun's critiques of the exhibit.

A number of photographers and artists refer to their experience of The Family of Man exhibition or publication as formative or influential on them and some, including Australian Graham McCarter, being motivated by it to take up photography. These include; Ans Westra, Marti Friedlander, Larry Seigel, John Cato, Paul Cox, Jan Yoors, Pentti Sammallahti, Robert McFarlane (photographer), John Blakemore, Robert Weingarten, and painter Francisco Toledo.

== Tributes, sequels and critical revisions ==
In the years since The Family of Man, several projects, exhibitions and publications were directly inspired by Steichen's. Westerbeck argues that although Steichen did not originate its 'mythic appeal', anthropology as a major genre of photography, and its subject, the whole human race as a united 'world family', became a public expectation and was a precursor to Marshall McLuhan's 'global village'.

Other publications presented oppositional viewpoints, while still others were alternative projects offering new thoughts on the themes and motifs presented in 1955. These serve to represent artists', photographers' and curators' responses to the exhibition beside those of the cultural critics, and to track the evolution of reactions as societies and their self-images change.

=== World Exhibition of Photography (1965) ===
Catalogue of the 1965 Weltausstellung der Fotographie (World Exhibition of Photography)

Following The Family of Man by 10 years, the 1965 Weltausstellung der Fotografie (World Exhibition of Photography) was based on an idea by Karl Pawek and, supported by the German magazine he edited, Stern, toured the world. It presented 555 photographs by 264 authors from 30 countries, outweighing the numbers in Steichen's exhibition. In the preface to the catalogue entitled "Die humane Kamera" ('The human Camera'), Heinrich Boll wrote:

"There are moments in which the meaning of a landscape and its breath become felt in a photograph. The portrayed person becomes familiar or a historical moment happens in front of the lens; a child in uniform, women who search the battlefield for their dead. They are moments in which crying is more than private as it becomes the crying of mankind. Secrets are not revealed, the secret about human existence becomes visible."

The exhibition, wrote Pawek, "would like to keep alive the spirit of Edward Steichen's wonderful ideas and of his memorable collection, The Family of Man". His exhibition posed the question 'Who is Man?' in 42 topics. It focused on issues that were sublimated in The Family of Man by the idea of universal brotherhood between men and women of different races and cultures. Racism, which in Steichen's show was represented by a lynching scene (replaced in the European showings by an enlargement of the famous picture of the Nuremberg trials), is confronted in the Weltausstellung der Fotografie section VIII "Das Missverständnis mit der Rasse" ('The Misunderstanding about Race') by the black man in the photograph by Gordon Parks who seems to view from his window two scenes of attacks on black people (photographed by Charles Moore). Another photograph by Henri Leighton shows two children walking together in public holding hands, one black, one white.

Though reference to the content of the older exhibition in the new is evident, the unifying idealism of The Family of Man is here replaced with a much more fragmented and sociological one. Sarah E. James points to its use of harsh juxtaposition to create a "stereoscopic vision" to entrain viewers reactions. The exhibition met with rejection by the press and functionaries in the photographic profession in Germany and Switzerland, and was described by Fritz Kempe, photographer, photo historian and board member of a prominent photo company, as "tasty fodder to stimulate the aggressive instincts of semi—intellectual young men.". Nevertheless, it went on to tour 261 art museums in 36 countries and was visited by 3,500,000 people.

=== 2nd World Exhibition of Photography (1968) ===
Cover of Stern (Hamburg) (1968). Die Frau: 2 Weltausstellung der Photographie

In 1968, a second Weltausstellung der Photographie (2nd World Exhibition of Photography) was devoted to images of women with 522 photographs from 85 countries by 236 photographers, of whom barely 10% were female (compared to 21% for The Family of Man), though there is evidence of the effect of feminist consciousness in images of men in domestic environments cleaning, cooking and tending babies. In his introduction, Karl Pawek writes: "I had approached the first exhibition with my entire theological, philosophical and sociological equipment. 'What is Man?'; the question had to awaken ideological ideas. [...] I also operated from a philosophical point of view when presenting the[se] photos. As far as woman was concerned, the theme of the second exhibition, I knew nothing. There I was, without any philosophy about woman. Perhaps woman is not a philosophical theme. Perhaps there is only mankind, and woman is something unique and special? Thus I could only hold on to what was concrete in the pictures." The exhibition tour included the Institute of Contemporary Art (ICA), which at the time rarely showed photography, and her experience of installing it was in part the inspiration for Sue Davies to start The Photographers Gallery, London.

=== The Family of Children (1977) ===
UNESCO named 1977 The Year of Children and in response the book The Family of Children was dedicated to Steichen by editor Jerry Mason, and imitated the original catalogue in its layout, in the use of quotations and in the colours used on the cover. As for Steichen's show there was a call-out for imagery but 300,000 entries were received compared to the 4 million at the MoMA show, resulting in a selection of 377 photos by 218 participants from 70 countries.

=== The Family of Woman: A World-Wide Photographic Perception of Female Life and Being (1979) ===
The Family of Woman, again edited by Jerry Mason and published by Ridge Press (publisher for The Family of Man book), appeared in 1979 and was reissued in 1983. The cover design based on Steichen's original and featured a Black Star agency picture of a woman in Greece with flowers in her hair. Project director was Julia Scully, and the art director, Albert Squillace.

A contemporary review of the book in Spokeswoman of December 1979 described it as an "an ambitious attempt to portray the ephemeral and the timeless qualities inherent in woman [...] Feelings of love, sisterhood, kindness, rage, hate, grief and delight are captured here in portraits of women of all ages and origins." The pictures were accompanied by quotations from writings of Emily Dickinson, Denise Levertov, Marianne Moore, Christina Stead, Diane Wakowski and others chosen by project editor Sylvia Cole.

Material from both The Family of Man and The Family of Woman were later featured at the Schweizerisches Architekturmuseum in Basel to represent the career path of a female professional from "the search for recognition to self-affirmation" in the 1989 Schweizerische Ausstellung für Frauenarbeit ('Swiss Exhibition for Women's Labour'), a project by three women architects, Inès Lamunière, Flora Ruchat-Roncati, and Beate Schnitte, commemorating expositions of Swiss women’s work of 1928 and 1958.

=== The World's Family (1983) ===
The World's Family was another Jerry Mason publication through the Putnam Group, and also with designer Albert Squillace and editor Sylvia Cole. Its contents were photographs solely by American Ken Heyman, too young, as Mason points out in his introduction, to have submitted images for The Family of Man. Mason cites Heyman's work of and for Margaret Mead as his credentials for a new "vision of humanity," thirty years after The Family of Man, and of a different world "in 1983 when one begins to feel the Orwellian predictions for 1984 multiplying themselves beyond imagination? Some communities of families sense themselves hurtling into obliteration and oblivion."

=== The Family of Man 1955–1984 (1984) ===
Independent curator Marvin Heiferman's The Family of Man 1955·1984 was a floor to ceiling collage of over 850 images and texts from magazines, newspapers and the art world shown in 1984 at PSI, The Institute for Art and Urban Resources Inc. (now MoMA PS1) Long Island City N.Y. Abigail Solomon-Godeau described it as a reexamination of the themes of the 1955 show and critique of Steichen's arrangement of them into a "spectacle";

...a grab bag of imagery and publicity ranging from baby food and sanitary napkin boxes to hard-core pornography, from detergent boxes to fashion photography, a cornucopia of consumer culture much of which, in one way or another, could be seen to engage the same themes purveyed in The Family of Man. In a certain sense, Heifferman's [sic] riposte to Steichen's show made the useful connection between the spectacle of the exhibition and the spectacle of the commodity, suggesting that both must be understood within the framing context of late capitalism.

=== Oppositions: We are the world, you are the third world (1990) ===
In 1990 the second Rotterdam Biennale lead exhibition was Oppositions: We are the world, you are the third world – Commitment and cultural identity in contemporary photography from Japan, Canada, Brazil, the Soviet Union and the Netherlands. The cover of the catalogue imitates the layout and colour of the original but replaces the famous image of the little flute player by Eugene Harris with six images, four photographs of young women from different cultural backgrounds and two excerpts from paintings. In the exhibit scenes of an endangered ecology and the threat to cultural identity in the global village predominate, but there are intimations that nature and love may prevail, despite everything artificial that surrounds it, notably so in family life.

=== New Relations. The Family of Man Revisited (1992) ===
In 1992 the American photographer and critic Larry Fink published a collection of photographs under the heading of New Relations. The Family of Man Revisited in the Photography Center Quarterly. His approach updated Steichen's vision by integrating aspects of human existence which Steichen had omitted both because of his wish for coherence and of his innermost convictions. Fink provides only the following commentary: "Rather than a fawn pretence to anthropological/sociologic analysis of the events depicted; rather than categorise and choose democratically for social relevance. I took the path of least resistance and most reward. I simply selected quality images with the belief that the path of strong visual energies would visit equal strong social presences". He concludes:

The show is a compendium of visual hints. It is not an answer or even a full question, but cognitive clues....

=== family, nation, tribe, community: SHIFT (1996) ===
Cover of the exhibition catalogue 'family, nation, tribe, community, SHIFT' 1996

In September/October 1996 the NGBK (Neue Gesellschaft fur Bildende kunst Berlin – New Society for the Visual Arts Berlin) in the context of Haus der Kulturen der Welt (House of World Cultures Berlin) conceived and organised the project family, nation, tribe, community: SHIFT with direct reference to the historical MoMA exhibition. In the catalogue, five authors; Ezra Stoller, Max Kozloff, Torsten Neuendorff, Bettina Allamoda and Jean Back analyse and comment on the historical model and twenty-two artists offer individual approaches around the following themes: Universalism/Separatism, Family/Anti-family, Individualisation, Common Strategies, Differences. The works are predominantly from artist photographers rather than photojournalists; Bettina Allamoda, Aziz + Cucher, Los Carpinteros, Alfredo Jaar, Mike Kelley, Edward and Nancy Reddin Kienholz, Lovett/Codagnone, Loring McAlpin, Christian Philipp Müller, Anna Petrie, Martha Rosler, Lisa Schmitz, Elaine Sturtevant, Mitra Tabizian and Andy Golding, Wolfgang Tillmans, Danny Tisdale, Lincoln Tobler, and David Wojnarowicz reflect major contemporary issues: identity, the information crisis, the illusion of leisure, and ethics. In his introduction to the exhibition, Frank Wagner writes that Steichen had offered a vision of an harmonious, neat and highly structured world which, in reality, was complex, often unintelligible and even contradictory, but by contrast, this Berlin exhibition highlights 'first' and 'third' world tensions and is eager to concentrate on a variety of attitudes.

=== The 90s: A Family of Man? (1997) ===
The 90s, A Family of Man?: Images of mankind in contemporary art

The following year Enrico Lunghi directed the exhibition The 90s: A Family of Man?: images of mankind in contemporary art, held 2 October–30 November 1997 in Luxembourg, Steichen's birthplace and by then the repository of the archive of a full version of his The Family of Man. Aside from their understanding of Steichen's efforts to present commonalities amongst the human race, curators Paul di Felice and Pierre Stiwer interpret Steichen's show as an effort to make content of Museum of Modern Art accessible to the public in an era when it was regarded as the elitist supporter of 'incomprehensible' abstract art. They point to their predecessor's success in having his show embraced by a record audience and emphasise that dissenting voices of criticism were heard only amongst 'intellectuals'. However, Steichen's success, they caution, was to manipulate the message of his selected imagery; "After all," they write, "wasn't he the artistic director of Vogue and Vanity Fair ... ?". They proclaim their desire to retain the exhibiting artists' 'autonomy' while not posing their work as the antithesis of Steichen's concept, but to respect, and echo, its arrangement while "raising questions"<it does not become clear, if the above words in simple '..' are actual quotations or just relativise the terms themselves.--> as indicated by the question mark in their quotation of the original title. The exhibition and catalogue 'quote' from Steichen, setting pages of the book of his exhibition with their quotations around groupings of images (in monochrome) beside the works of contemporary artists (predominantly in colour) collected in themes used in the original, though the correlation fails for some contemporary ideas, which digital imaging, installation and montage works effectively convey. The thirty-five artists include Christian Boltanski, Nan Goldin, Inez van Lamsweerde, Orlan and Wolfgang Tillmans.

=== The Family of Man 2 (2005) ===
From 1999 to 2005, Leica Users Group members: Alastair Firkin, Satoshi Oka, Tim Spragens, Tom Smart and Stanislaw Stawowy organized The Family of Man 2 project to celebrate new millennium, 50 years of the Leica M system, and the Edward Steichen project anniversary. As with Steichen's project, the thousands of photos received were edited to 500, 100 annually during the project. It was exhibited online and an album with winning photos was privately published.

=== Reconsidering The Family of Man (2012) ===
The Photographic Society of America (PSA) drew on their archives to stage Reconsidering The Family of Man during April and May 2012. Not hung and mounted as an installation, Artspace at Untitled executive director<--Artspace at Burris' display? unintelligible. + Untitled (publication)--> Jon Burris' linear display was based on the concept of Steichen's original exhibit but concentrated on his sub-theme of the passage from birth to death. From the close to 5,000 photographs in the PSA collection, a selection of 50 original prints was made for their show. One work in common with the original exhibition was Ansel Adams' Mount Williamson from Manzanar which in The Family of Man was presented at mural scale, while the PSA used a vintage, 11" x 14" Adams print from their collection, displaying it while a first edition copy of The Family of Man publication opened to a double-page spread of Adams photograph.

=== The Family of the Invisibles (2016) ===
As part of the 2015–2016 France-Korea year, curators of the Centre national des arts plastiques (Cnap) and the Fonds Régional d'Art Contemporain of Aquitaine (Frac Aquitaine), Pascal Beausse (Cnap), Claire Jacquet (Frac Aquitaine), and Magali Nachtergael, Assistant Professor at the Sorbonne, collaborated to produce the exhibition The Family of the Invisibles at the Seoul Museum of Art (SeMA) and the Ilwoo Space in Seoul, from 5 April to 29 May 2016. The show was devoted to invisible and minority figures, their demands for identity, and the possibility of reconfiguring a politics of representation to the ideal of giving a place to each member of the human community as represented in more than 200 emblematic photographs. The works from the 1930s to 2016, drawn from the Cnap and Frac Aquitaine collections were selected on the principle of Roland Barthes' deconstruction identified by the curators in his Mythologies and in Camera Lucida, the latter being treated as a visual manifesto for minorities. The exhibition was presented in the Seoul Museum of Art in four sections, culminating in provocative contemporary photography including the 2009 series of deceased migrants wrapped in cloth in Les Proscrits ('The Outcasts') by Mathieu Pernot, and Sophie Calle's 1986 Les Aveugles in which she photographed those things that her blind subjects described as the most beautiful. The "Prologue" of the exhibition at the Ilwoo Space, provided a critical and historical counterpoint. Texts by Pascal Beausse, Jacqueline Guittard, Claire Jacquet and Magali Nachtergael, Suejin Shin (Ilwoo Foundation) and Kyung-hwan Yeo (SeMA) were presented in a catalogue.

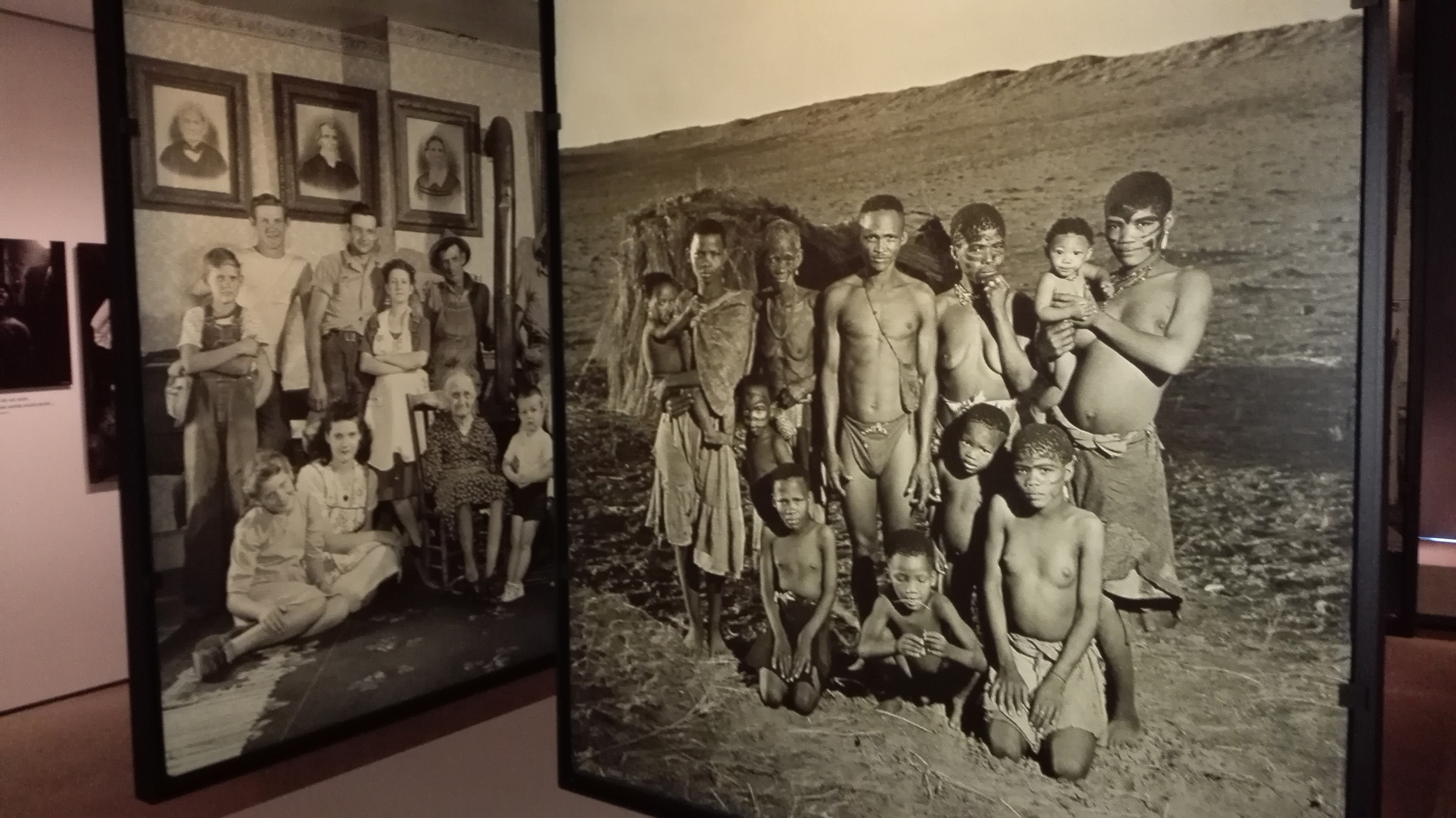
Installation view of The Family of Man permanent exhibition at Clervaux Castle, Luxembourg

=== The Family Of No Man: Re-visioning the world through non-male eyes (2018) ===
The Family Of No Man: Re-visioning the world through non-male eyes, held July 2–8, 2018, in Arles brought together responses to an open call by Cosmos Arles Books, a satellite space of the Rencontres d'Arles, by 494 female and inter-gender artists from all around the world, in a revisitation of Edward Steichen's original. Works were displayed in interactive installations outdoors and indoors, and uploaded to an online platform as they were received.

=== Permanent installation, Chateau Clervaux, Luxembourg ===
The permanent installation of the exhibition today at Chateau Clervaux in Luxembourg follows the layout of the inaugural exhibition at MoMA in order to recreate the original viewing experience, though of necessity, it is adapted to the unique space of two floors of the restored Castle. Since the 2013 restoration it has incorporated a library (that includes some of the catalogues of the sequel exhibitions above) and contextualises The Family of Man with historical material and interpretation.

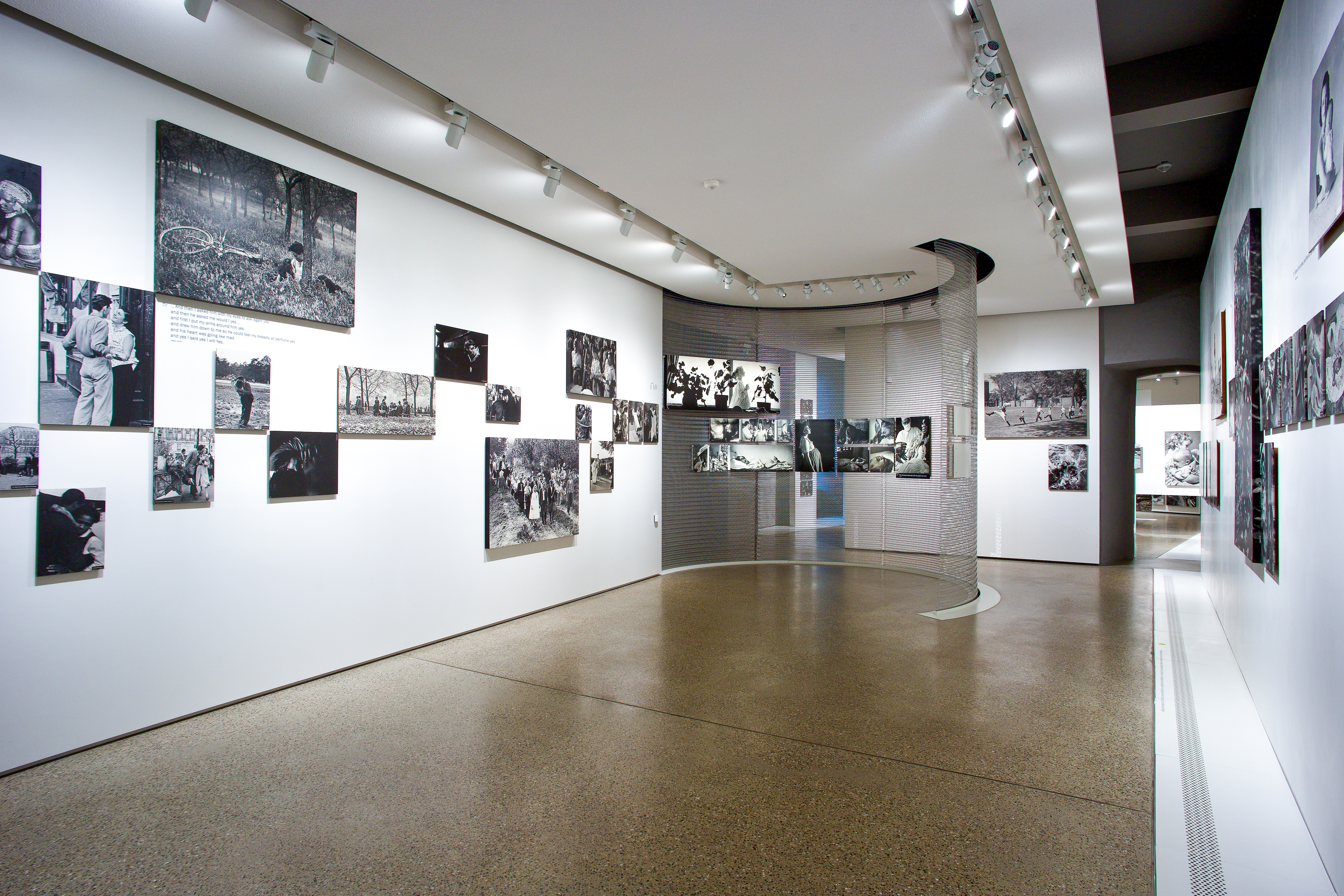
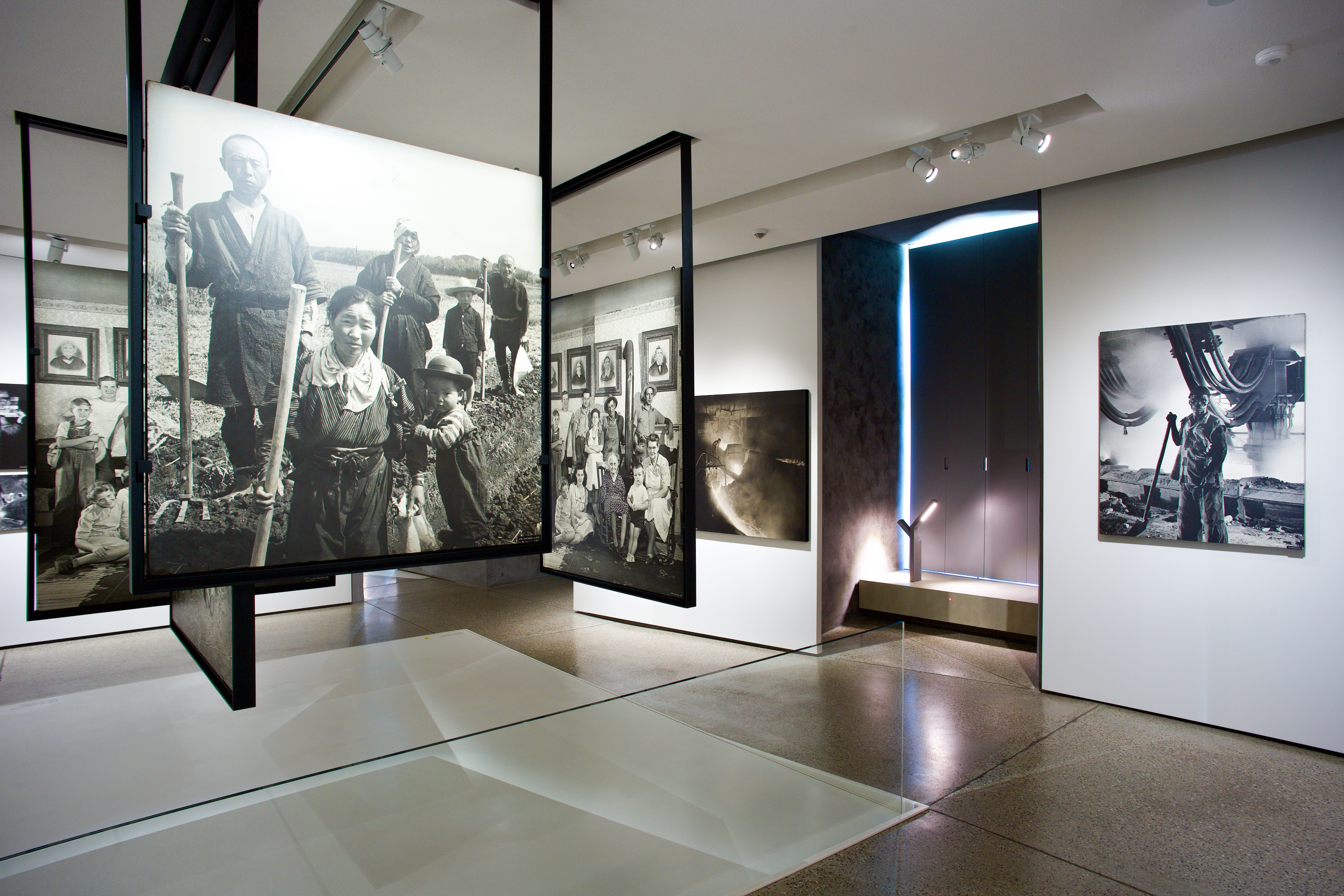
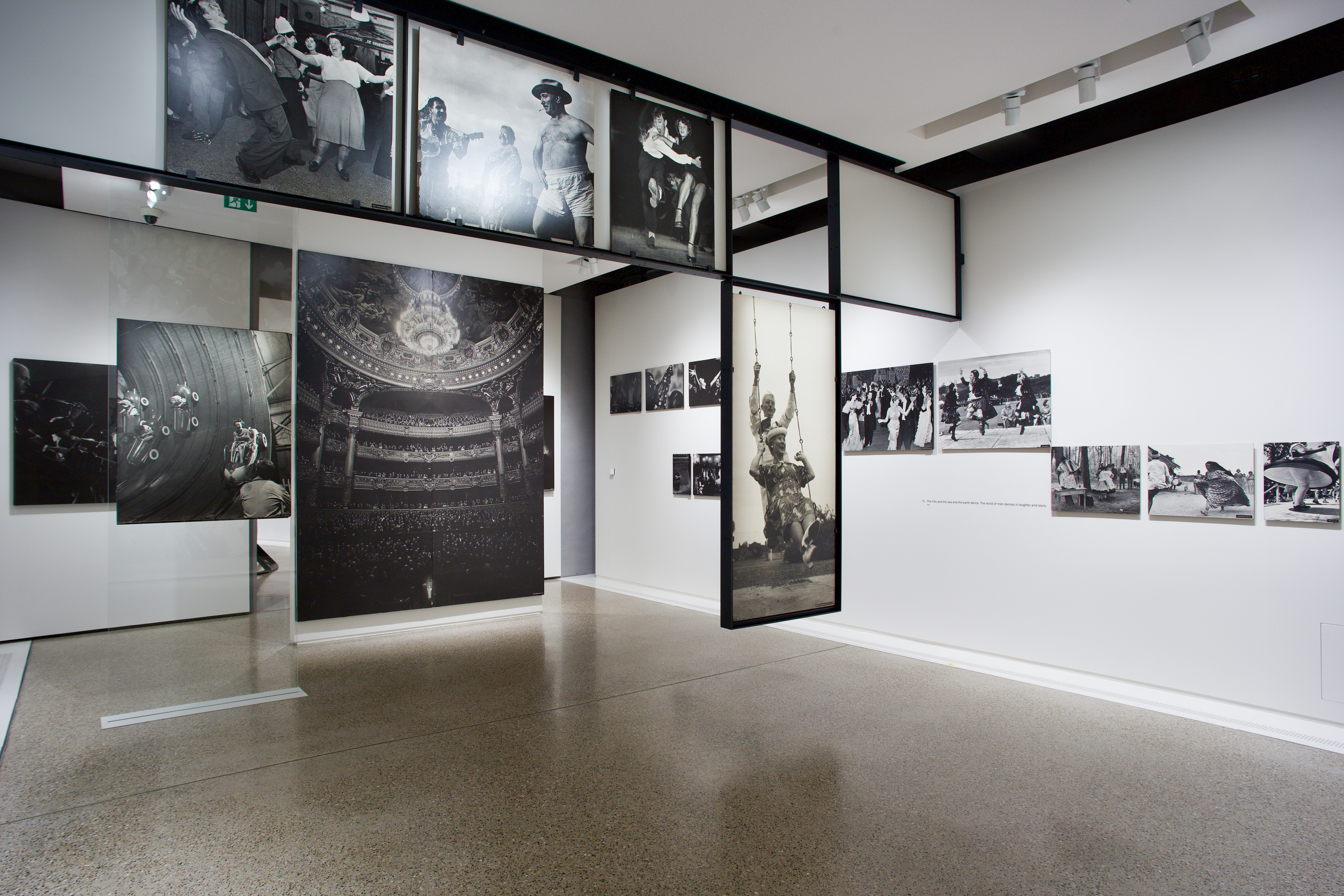

== Cultural references to The Family of Man ==
- Karl Dallas' song, "The Family of Man", also recorded by the English band The Spinners and others, was written in 1955, after Dallas saw the exhibition.
- In 1962, Instytut Mikołowski published Komentarze do fotografii. The Family of Man by Polish poet Witold Wirpsza (1918–1985), a commentary on individual photographs and selected displays from the exhibition.
