= Nat Farbman =

LIFE magazine photographer

- Born: 1907; Poland
- Died: 1988 (aged 80–81); United States
- Education: University of Santa Clara
- Occupation: LIFE magazine photographer
- Years active: 1946–1961
- Spouse: Patsy (Pat) English (m. 1938)

Notes
- emigrated from Poland to USA in 1911

Nat Farbman (1907 in Poland – 1988 in USA) immigrated to United States 1911, was a photographer for LIFE magazine from 1946 to 1961.

At the University of Santa Clara Farbman enrolled in electrical engineering. He became a photojournalist, commercial and fashion photographer

He married Patsy (Pat) English, a model who became a photographer, in 1938. She had learned photography from Ansel Adams whom she met in 1936, modelling for him on commercial jobs.

== LIFE magazine ==
His first overseas assignment for LIFE was to cover the Greek elections for the April 22, 1946 edition. He and Pat travelled then to Italy, Austria, and South Africa, where they photographed Boer farmers for the December 18, 1946 edition. They produced a series of photographs of the Bechuanaland (now Botswana) bushmen tribes in 1947, six of which were used in The Family of Man, most famous being ‘Kung San storyteller’. The couple then travelled in the UK, France and Poland to photograph postwar recovery in Europe.

His 1965 coverage of the California floods in colour was amongst his last LIFE assignments, but he continued to practice into the 1970s.

== Publications ==
Articles in LIFE magazine illustrated by Nat Farbman:

- LIFE - 26 Mar 1945 - Page 23
- LIFE - 20 Mar 1950 - Page 20
- LIFE Vol. 28, No. 12
- LIFE - 22 Apr 1946 - Page 24
- LIFE - 18 Jan 1954 - Page 12
- LIFE Vol. 36, No. 3
- LIFE - 8 Jan 1965 - Page 9
- LIFE - 16 Dec 1946 - Page 25
- LIFE - 20 Aug 1956 - Page 2
- LIFE Vol. 41, No. 8
