= Bob Jakobsen =

American Los Angeles Times press photographer

Bob Kjer Jakobsen (March 8, 1918 in Portland, Oregon – May 27, 2002) was a Los Angeles Times press photographer who was active from the 1930s to the 1960s.

== Significance ==
Jakobsen's most famous photograph won the 1942 Associated Press annual photo contest for California and Nevada, and fourth place in the national Associated Press contest in 1943. It was selected by Edward Steichen for the 1955 Museum of Modern Art world touring exhibition The Family of Man, which was seen by 9 million visitors. When in 1940, the United States expanded its military, units were deployed to expanded Pacific bases, including the 251st Coast Artillery (1,200 National Guardsmen), ordered into service on Sept. 16, 1940, which was transferred to Hawaii. The anti-aircraft unit later was responsible for downing at least two attacking Japanese planes at Pearl Harbor on Dec. 7, 1941.

Five photos of the men boarding the luxury liner Washington by Los Angeles Times staff photographer Jakobsen appeared in the Nov. 17, 1940, Los Angeles Times Sunday rotogravure section, the lead being his tightly cropped picture of Pvt. John Winbury farewelling his tearful little boy.

Jakobsen's was 'Picture of the Week' in the Nov. 25, 1940, issue of Life magazine, captioned;

"The dock in Los Angeles harbor was crowded with 743 other men, all dressed like Robert's father, who were saying goodbye to other boys and girls like Robert and other women like Robert's mother. Robert's father called him "Butch" and told him to chin up, but Robert was not to be consoled."

During World War II Jakobsen produced publicity material for the Navy, in particular for the United States Maritime Service Training Station at Avalon.

Another of his Los Angeles Times photographs, from June 22, 1947, showed the tanker S. S. Markay on fire after it exploded in Los Angeles Harbor.

== Personal life ==
Jakobsen met his future wife Lucia Hammer (1917–2007) at a photography club in Portland. They were married for eighteen years.

== Included in collections ==
- The Family of Man Museum, Clervaux Castle, Luxembourg
- Los Angeles Times Photographic Archives, UCLA, Library Special Collections, Charles E. Young Research Library
- Los Angeles Public Library Photo Collection, Los Angeles Public Library
- Claremont Colleges Photo Archive, Claremont Colleges Library

== Photographs published in ==
- Montoya, Carina Monica (2018), Pacific Coast Highway in California, Arcadia Publishing, ISBN 978-1-4671-2751-6
