= Henri Leighton =

American photographer, technical writer on photography, and craft jeweller (1917-2004)

Henri Leighton (born Levi; June 30, 1917 – May 21, 2004) was an American photographer and technical writer on photography, noted for his mid-century pictures of African-American children playing in city streets. In his fifties he abandoned photography for a later career, teaching himself jewellery, which he sold commercially.

== Early life and education ==
Henri Leighton was born in 1917 in Memphis, son of Theo Levi, a merchant and son of German immigrants; and Janet Shuster Levi. He received a bachelor’s degree in English literature from the University of Mississippi in 1938. He served as a cryptographer in the Army Air Force during World War II.

== Photographer and writer ==
Leighton's photographs show a consistent interest in childhood and closeness, and in the street photography genre in which he practiced he also shot night scenes and radically motion-blurred images of the hectic Times Square precinct. He used an early example of single-lens reflex camera, the 35 mm format Exakta, and the Contax 35mm rangefinder.

Leighton wrote for a number of publications on technical aspects of photography

== Recognition ==
The now best-known of Leighton's street photographs was selected by Edward Steichen for The Museum of Modern Art 1955 world-touring exhibition The Family of Man seen by 9 million visitors. The picture was made in the year leading up to the Supreme Court (May 17, 1954) decision in Brown vs. Board of Education that abolished racial segregation in American schools. It shows two boys, one who is black with his arm over the shoulders of his companion who is white, walking in step past run-down shops. The taller boy delicately clasps a baseball card in his left hand, as if having just shown it to his friend. They are observed by an old white man sitting idly on a shop step clasping his walking-stick while another has his back turned to look at a cafe menu.

The image is among a number of non-stereotypical images of black Americans at work and play in The Family of Man which curator Steichen chose to challenge and subvert racial stereotypes and demystify mainstream discourses on social and ethnic relations. The image has been used in several texts as a teaching resource, and in psychology publications Leighton's photographs also illustrated Frederick E. Robin & Selma G. Hirsh's The Pursuit of Equality: A Half Century with the American Jewish Committee (Crown Publishers, New York, 1957)

Several such Leighton photographs of black Americans were represented in a Middlebury College Museum of Art exhibition Many Thousand Gone: Portraits of the African-American Experience May 22–August 9, 2015, co-curated by Middlebury Associate Professor of History William Hart and the students in his Spring 2015 African-American History course.

== Craftsman ==
A self-taught craftsman, from the late 1960s, Leighton, and his wife Paula Gollhardt-Leighton, made and marketed their jewellery, and her fashion designs, from a shop in New York City, before owning and operating the “Beautiful Things Factory” shop in Scotch Plains, N.J. from 1973 They exhibited together at the Vitti Artisans Gallery, and in major galleries including the Museum of Contemporary Craft, the Fairtree Gallery, St. Paul Art Center, the Corcoran Gallery, the Morris Museum, Hunterdon Art Centre, Montclair Art Museum, Newark Museum, and Boston City Hall. Leighton sold the store 'Beautiful Things' upon Paula's death in 1992, and it was operated by Nell and Austin Goodwin until 2006.

== Personal life ==
Leighton was resident of Vicksburg, New York City, and Summit, N.J. He moved to Plainfield in 1984, where he died at 86 years old on Friday, May 21, 2004, at his home, and was buried as Henri Levi. He was survived by a brother, Ted Levi.

== Collections ==
- Henri Leighton's works in the collection of the Nelson-Atkins Museum of Art
- Henri Leighton on the MoMA website
- Henri Leighton photographs at Middlebury College Museum of Art

== Awards ==
- 1985: Fellowship from the New Jersey State Council on the Arts.
