= Jacob Lofman =

Photojournalist

Jacob Lofman (August 31, 1911, Poland–February 8, 2002, New York) was a Polish-born American photojournalist.

== Career ==
Born in Poland, after emigrating to the United States Jacob Lofman became a professional photographer. He was a member of Roy Stryker's team of photographers for the Farm Security Administration during the Depression. His work was widely distributed through the agency PIX, Inc. and appeared in mass-market and specialist magazines including Popular Photography, The Saturday Evening Post, The Farm Quarterly, Ebony, Finance, Minicam Photography, Collier’s, Saturday Review, U.S. Camera, Art Direction, New Politics, Review of international affairs, The American Magazine, Business Week, The Rocket, The Nation's Business, Fortune, Time, Life, Broadcasting, Look, House and Garden, Harper's Bazaar, The creative writer, Coronet, The New York Times Book Review.

Among the many celebrities he photographed were columnist Dorothy Parker, poet Robert Frost and boxer Sugar Ray Robinson, and one of his photographs included in the world-touring 1955 Museum of Modern Art exhibition The Family of Man, is a backlit long-shot of American poet Robert Frost with his children & grandchildren gathered on logs in a sunny clearing in front of a backdrop of the Green Mountains listening to folk singer Danny Gragon, who plays fiddle.

== Politics ==
Lofman joined the Socialist Zionist organization, Hashomer Hatzair at an early age and maintained his interest in Jewish history and culture. Involved with organisations devoted to Socialist Zionism and various forms of socialism (including, for some years, Trotskyism), he remained a member the group in the U.S., read widely in Jewish culture and socialist politics, in several languages, and wrote for the New York-based publication of Hashomer Hatzair. Having followed Max Shachtman in the late 1930s he became a member of Shachtman's Workers Party in the 40s, but resigned in about 1948 following a dispute with Shachtman. Involved with the Socialist Party in the 1950s and with Michael Harrington's Democratic Socialists of America in the 1960s and 70s, and eventually with Social Democrats, USA, he was a speaker on leftist and Jewish themes, and wrote for a number of newspapers, journals and newsletters.

== Personal life ==
Lofman and his wife, Rivke, had no children.

== Collections ==
- The Roy Stryker Study Collection, Henry Holmes Smith Archive
- Tamiment Library and Robert F. Wagner Labor Archive, Guide to the Jacob Lofman Papers TAM 285, Elmer Holmes Bobst Library
