= Vito Fiorenza =

American photographer

Vito Fiorenza (1927 – March 23, 2015) was a photographer born in New York.

== Career ==
Fiorenza first visited Sicily in the late 1940s, then in the mid-1950s, Fiorenza and his wife traveled back to Italy; some of these photographs were reproduced in his self-published volume Sicilian Town.

In 1954 he won a Village Camera Club prize and in 1955 three of his Sicilian scenes were included in Edward Steichen’s blockbuster The Family of Man exhibition, one of them, a group portrait of a Sicilian family, was grouped with others in the central display, at the Museum of Modern Art (MoMA) which subsequently toured the world.

His Sicilian photographs were shown again in 1967 at the Lincoln Center as part of the Virtuosi di Roma-Vivaldi Festival.

Fiorenza died after a short illness on March 23, 2015.
