= John Bertolino =

American photojournalist

John Bertolino (February 16, 1914 – April 22, 2003) was an American photojournalist who photographed in Italy and the United States and was active in the 1950s and 1960s.

== Biography ==
John P. Bertolino was born on February 16, 1914, in Pence, Wisconsin.

After serving as a tail gunner in the United States Army Air Forces during World War II, he traveled throughout Europe and the United States.

From 1948 Bertolino studied at the first fine-art photography department in the United States created in 1946 at the California School of Fine Arts (now known as the San Francisco Art Institute), founded by Ansel Adams, directed by Minor White, and staffed by such leading practitioners as Imogen Cunningham, Dorothea Lange, Lisette Model, and Edward Weston. Its modern photography curriculum advanced the academic standing of the medium and spawned a unique group of photographers who went on to become important contributors to visual culture.

The exhibition Perceptions at the San Francisco Museum of Art on August 10, 1954, showcased a decade of photography in San Francisco and the Bay Area by forty-six photographers exhibited in Perceptions, among them were “Distinguished students” including John Bertolino with Zoe [Lowenthal] Brown, Benjamen Chinn, Bob Hollingsworth, Gene Petersen, Nata Piaskowski, F. W. Quandt, Jr. Donald Ross, Charles Wong, and Harold Zegart.

In 1950 he returned to Italy with his Leica camera to make documentary photography of contemporary Italian life. This work was exhibited at the M.H. de Young Museum in 1952.

== Recognition ==
Photography from Bertolino's School of Fine Arts years featured in the exhibition and publicationThe golden decade: photography at the California School of Fine Arts, 1945–55

His ‘The Mandolin Player’, of this period, taken in Italy in 1950, featured in his first solo show Photographs of Italy by John Bertolino at the de Young museum in San Francisco, California, described by critic Alfred Frankenstein as “proletarian realism... all very true to life because it is also very true to the art of photography. Everything is beautifully placed and the resonances of tone are beautifully handled.”.

The same image was selected in 1955 by curator Edward Steichen for The Family of Man, a world-touring Museum of Modern Art exhibition seen by 9 million visitors. The picture later appeared on the cover of Peter Poulsen’s & Astrid Ellehammer Kristensen’s Allegro ma non troppo.

== Personal life ==
With his wife Marjorie, Bertolino lived in Mill Valley, California US, and died on April 22, 2003, at age 89.

== Exhibitions ==
=== Solo exhibitions ===
- 1952 (September) Italy: Photographs by John Bertolino, M.H. de Young Museum, San Francisco, California
- 1957 (June) St. Mary’s Mission, San Francisco, California

=== Group ===
- 1954 (August–September) Perceptions, San Francisco Museum of Art, San Francisco, California
- 1955 (January–May) The Family of Man, Museum of Modern Art, New York City, New York
- 2010 (September–October) "The Golden Decade: Photography at the California School of Fine Arts", San Francisco Art Institute, San Francisco, California

== Collections ==
- Minneapolis Institute of Art, Minneapolis, Minnesota
- The Museum of Fine Arts, Houston, Texas
- Clervaux Castle, Luxembourg, Germany
- Paul M. Hertzmann, Inc., San Francisco, California

== Publication features ==
- 1950 Andy Geçan, “Profile of an Artist,” Viewpoint, 3:9, pp. 10–11.
- 1952 Arthur Bloomfield, “Italian Camera Studies On Display at de Young Museum,” San Francisco Call-Bulletin, p. 3
- 1952 Alfred Frankenstein, “A Collection of Feathers Takes On a Serious, Majestic Tone,” San Francisco Chronicle, (This World), p. 30.
- 1954 Dody Warren, “Perceptions,” Aperture 2:4, p. 17.
- 1954 Edward Steichen, The Family of Man, p. 102.
- 1955 Alfred Frankenstein, “The Lively Arts: ‘Family of Man’—N.Y. Museum Shows Photos,” San Francisco Chronicle, p. 15.
- 1957 San Francisco Chronicle, (This World) p. 14.
