= Hugh Bell (photographer) =

American photographer (1927–2012)

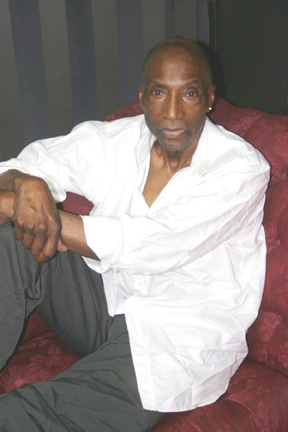
Bell in 2006

Hugh Cecil Lancelot Bell (born June 22, 1927 – October 31, 2012) was an American photographer. He was best known for his jazz photographs from the 1950s and 1960s. He also photographed fashion and still life images for Esquire, Ebony, Essence, American Visions, and others, as well as taking part in Edward Steichen's "The Family of Man" project. Bell was a member of the American Society of Media Photographers.

== Biography ==
Bell was born in New York in 1927 to parents who emigrated from the Caribbean island of St. Lucia. Bell attended George Washington High School in Manhattan, where he was one of their long distance track stars, and graduated in 1945. He spent a lot of time doing the thing he liked best, photographing jazz musicians. One of Bell's iconic jazz photos is a sad portrait of Charlie Parker at the Open Door club on Manhattan's Lower East Side. After graduating from New York University in 1952 with a bachelor's degree in Journalism and Cinematic Art, Bell was invited by Edward Steichen to participate in the Museum of Modern Art's landmark exhibition, The Family of Man. Over a period of three years, Steichen edited two million candidate photographs to arrive at 503 final images representing 293 photographers from 68 nations. After opening in New York on January 26, 1955, the exhibition continued to 69 venues in 37 foreign countries, making it one of the most successful photographic exhibitions of all time. Its purpose, in Steichen's words, was to seek "photographs covering the gamut of human relations, particularly the hard-to-find photographs of the everydayness in the relationships of man to himself, to his family, to the community, and to the world we live in."

Bell's studio was at 873 Broadway, New York City, on the corner of East 18th Street. Following kidney failure in 2004 (which left him on dialysis), a stroke, and leukemia, Bell died on October 31, 2012.
