= Peter Moeschlin =

Peter Moeschlin (10 May 1924 – 2003) was a Swiss photographer known for reportage, press and publicity photography, for fine art imagery and as a motion picture director.

== Life and professional work ==
Peter Moeschlin was born and was active in Basel, where he was apprenticed to Carl Hoffmann (1883–1969) and then took various employment as a photographer, including (from 1943 to 1947) in Studio Eidenbenz, founded in 1933 by the brothers Hermann, Reinhold and Willi Eidenbenz, who also employed Robert Frank.

Moeschlin spent eight months in England in 1947 as freelance reportage photographer and the following year spent several months in French North Africa. He was a reporter for Die Woche in the early 1950s, leaving to take up freelance professional work.

In 1951, in partnership with Christian Baur, he opened the Atelier Moeschlin + Baur in Basel, producing architectural, industrial, advertising and art photography, and publishing a picture book on Pablo Casals 1956.

He made a 20 minute documentary film Gefahr Nordwest. Seenoteinsatz in der Nordsee ('Danger North-West: sea rescues in the North Sea') during 1956-8, and in 1959/60 he was an assistant director and manager of film productions.

After 1967 he returned to working from his own photographic studio.

== Fine art photography ==
In his personal work he was a disciple of Otto Steinert’s ‘Fotoform’, of which Moeschlin's slow-shutter, semi-abstract Seagull in Flight was identified as an example by historian of photography Helmut Gernsheim and featured in LIFE magazine.

== Recognition ==
Awarded the Eidgenössisches Stipendium (Federal Art Scholarship) in 1950, in 1955 Moeschlin was recognised with acceptance into the Kollegium Schweizer Photographen and in the same year his low-angle picture of two elderly women in animated conversation in the street was selected for MoMA’s world-touring The Family of Man exhibition curated by Edward Steichen.

== Publications ==
- Gewerbemuseum Basel (Hg.): Photographie in der Schweiz - Heute (cat.), Basel, Gewerbemuseum 1949.
- Collet, Maurice (Hg.): Photo 49. Photographie en Suisse. Photographie in der Schweiz. Swiss photography, Reihe: Publicité et arts graphiques, Spezialnummer 1949.
- Organisationskomitee der 150-Jahrfeier des Kantons Aargau (Hg.): Jubilierender Aargau. Erinnerungsschrift zur 150-Jahrfeier 1953, Aarau, Buchdruckerei Neue Aargauer Zeitung 1953.
- Seiler, Alexander J.P.; Moeschlin, Peter: Casals, Olten, Otto Walter 1956.
- Roedelberger, Franz Adam: Das Sonnenbuch vom Bündnerland, vom Wallis und Tessin, Bern, Verbandsdruckerei 1957.
- Moeschlin, Peter: Gefahr Nordwest. Seenoteinsatz in der Nordsee [Film], 1958.
- Kübler, Arnold: Mitenand, gägenenand, durenand. Ein Bilderbuch vom Umgang mit dem Nächsten in der Schweiz, Zürich, Ex Libris 1959.
- Klaus, Fritz; Strübin, Theodor; Moeschlin, Peter; Schellenberg, Heinrich; Rausser, Edith: Baselland zwischen Strom und Berg, Genf, Ed. Générales 1959.
- Stoecklin, Hansjörg; Moeschlin, Peter; Pardey, Andreas: Fotografen sehen Jean Tinguely: Hansjörg Stoecklin, Peter Moeschlin, Basel, Museum Jean Tinguely 1999.
- Hiltbrand, Robert; Hort, Hans Peter: Kuttlebutzer Basel 1957-1999, Basel, Kuttlebutzer - Fasnachtsgesellschaft zum Saich 2003.
- Lüem, Barbara: Heimathafen Basel. Die Schweizer Rhein- und Hochseeschifffahrt, Basel 2003.

== Exhibitions ==
- 1949, Basel, Gewerbemuseum, Photographie in der Schweiz - Heute.
- 1952, Luzern, Kunsthaus, Weltausstellung der Photographie.
- 1999, Basel, Museum Tinguely, Sali Sepi - di Jeannot.
- 2004, Basel, Historisches Museum Basel, Blickfänger. Fotografien in Basel aus zwei Jahrhunderten.
