= Husler =

Husler is a surname. Notable people with the surname include:

- Ann Husler (1803–1874), English quarry owner and stone merchant
- Horace Husler (1890−1959), English footballer
- Marc-Andrea Hüsler (born 1996), Swiss tennis player

== See also ==
- Busler
