= Al Chang =

American photographer (1922–2007)

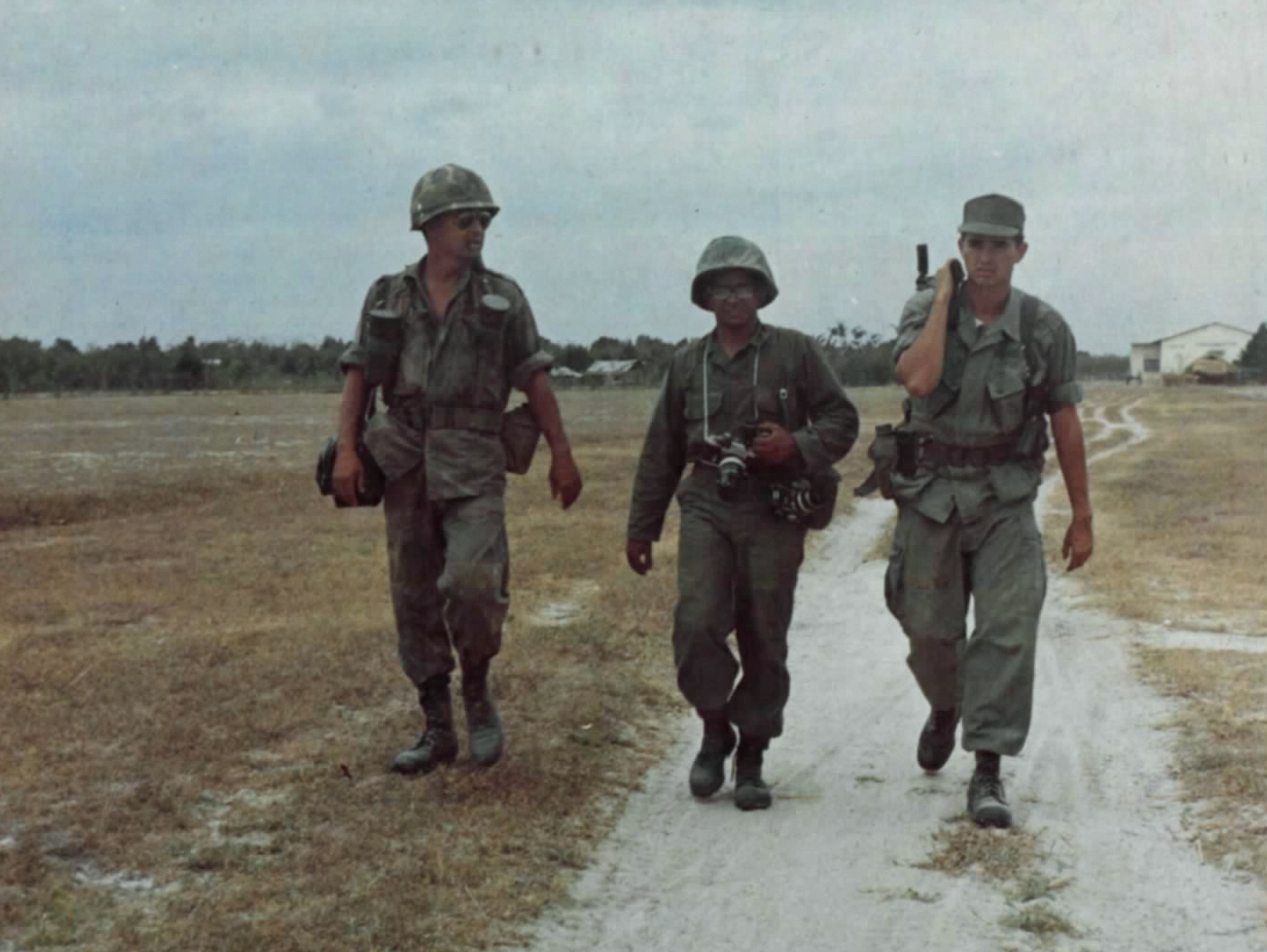
- Chang (left) with Charles Chellapah, freelance (center) and SP4 Kermit H. Yoho DASPO (right)
- Born: July 13, 1922; America
- Died: September 30, 2007 (aged 85)
- Occupation: Military photographer
- Known for: Twice nominated for the Pulitzer Prize

Al Chang (July 13, 1922 – September 30, 2007) was an American military photographer twice nominated for the Pulitzer Prize.

He was a dock worker in 1941 when he witnessed the Japanese attack on Pearl Harbor, and would later work as a military photographer for the United States Army, serving in World War II, and the Korean War and the Vietnam War. He briefly left the armed forces to work for National Geographic and the Associated Press during the Vietnam War, but then returned to work for the Army during the war.

His work includes photographs of the official surrender of Japan aboard the USS Missouri, but his best-known photograph is of an American Korean War infantryman being comforted by a fellow soldier after learning of the death of a friend; it was featured in Edward Steichen's The Family of Man.
