= Hannes Rosenberg =

German photojournalist

Hannes Rosenberg was a German photojournalist, born July 13, 1916 in Switzerland, active from the 1940s.

== Career ==
The couple Hannes and Annelise Rosenberg produced reports for German and international newspapers and illustrated magazines during the post-World War II era, including general news and specialist photography publications, as well as book illustration, and by the 1960s were undertaking general commercial and advertising work and interiors

From the mid-1940s Rosenberg concentrated on imagery of everyday life in Germany, such as theatre and cabaret in the beer hall, and was a photographer for Süddeutsche Zeitung and others before he garnered international commissions, with his ‘Through the Iron Curtain’ being published in The New York Times on July 27, 1952, followed in November 1954 by his illustrations for a story on the distribution of anti-communist propaganda over the West German border by balloon. He provided images for the Life magazine story on American journalist William N. Oatis after his release from jail 1953 for espionage by the Czechoslovak Socialist Republic.

In 1955 curator Edward Steichen selected photographs by both Hannes and Annalise for the world-touring Museum of Modern Art exhibition The Family of Man, seen by 9 million visitors. Hannes Rosenberg's photograph of proud grandparents watching their toddling grandchild is distinctly European in its setting; a broad, cobbled city square. Annelise contributed a picture of girls pinning Christmas decorations on their little sister's smock.

Rosenberg favoured the Leica 35mm camera for his reportage.

== Portraits ==
Among Rosenberg's portrait subjects included German Federal Chancellor Konrad Adenauer; graphic designer and typographer Otl Aicher at the urban planning group at the Ulm Adult Education Centre in about November 1949; and writer Hans Werner Richter, Inge Aicher-Scholl, and architect Max Bill whom he photographed from underneath a glass tabletop at the Ulm School of Design (Hochschule für Gestaltung Ulm, or HfG) in 1949/1950, for the weekend supplement of the Munich newspaper Neue Zeitung. As part of their journalistic work, the two photojournalists also wrote comprehensive reportages about the Ulm Adult Education Center and the Ulm College of Design, and their photographs are held in the archives and are part of the permanent exhibition of the HfG. As Hannes Rosenberg increasingly dealt with advertising, the strikingly modern institution served as a background for his publicity photos for AEG and other companies. Otl Aicher designed the furniture their apartment on Alfonsstraße in Munich, where artists and authors as well as members of Gruppe 47 frequently met, basing his designs for the study on the needs of the spouses by equipping the desk with a light table for viewing slides and a drawer for the Erika typewriter, and a cupboard which stored their photo archive.

== Publications ==
- The Family of Man, The photographic exhibition created by Edward Steichen for the Museum of Modern Art, New York 1955
- Norman Hall / Basil Burton (ed.), International Yearbook of Photography 1956, published by Photography Magazine, London 1955
- Rosen, lke. Crafting with children. Cover and illustrations by Hannes Rosenberg. Antwerp, Standard Publisher, 1972
- Foto-Expo - Documents from twenty years of current events, pictures of an exhibition of reportage photos of the last twenty years, publisher Th. Martens & Co., Munich o.J. (around 1968/69)
- Karin Hartewig, We are in the picture, Leipzig 2010, p. 49
- Halle an der Saale 1945/46: Ein Zeitdokument in Bildern (A contemporary document in pictures). 2001 Halle (Saale, Allemagne: Mitteldt. Verl.-Ges., reprinted from Central German publishing house, 1947

== Work in collections ==
- Museum Folkwang
- Stadtarchiv München
- Archief Spaarnestad
- Report Digital
- Clervaux Castle, Luxembourg

== Photographs in ==
- Hansen, Hans Jürgen; Flemming, Hanns Theodor (1972), Late nineteenth century art : the art, architecture, and applied art of the "pompous age,", McGraw-Hill, ISBN 978-0-07-026053-5
- Hansen, Hans Jürgen (1967), De glorie van het schip. : Kunst en kunstnijverheid van scheepsbouwers en zeelieden, Elsevier
- E. J. Klinsky and Hanns Reich (ed.), Pictures Writing History - Germany 1945 to today, introduction by Theodor Heuss, Hanns Reich Verlag, Munich 1962
- Weymar, Paul (1955), Konrad Adenauer : die autorisierte Biographie, Kindler
- Spitz, René; Hochschule für Gestaltung (Ulm, Germany) (2002), Hfg Ulm : the view behind the foreground : the political history of the Ulm School of Design 1953-1968, Edition Axel Menges, ISBN 978-3-932565-17-5
- Helene Ehman, Die neue Arche With adaptation of words by H. Ch. Andersen, Ausgewählte Märchen, 2 vols., 1947-49 (vol. 1, 5th ed. 1949)
- Rosen, Ike (1972), Modern embroidery, Batsford, ISBN 978-0-7134-2655-7

== Publications about ==
- Morgan, Willard Detering, 1900-1967 (1949). The Encyclopedia of photography : a complete guide to amateur photography. National educational alliance.
- Derenthal, L.; Pohlmann, U.; List, H.; Fotomuseum, München (1995). Herbert List, Memento 1945: Münchner Ruinen; [anlässlich der Ausstellung vom 3. Mai bis zum 26. Juni 1995 im Fotomuseum im Münchner Stadtmuseum]. München: Schirmer/Mosel.
- Stockler, Heinrich; Roscher, W. E (1956), The Leica in professional practice, Fountain Press
