= Carter Jones (photographer) =

American freelance photographer (1913-1968)

Carter Jones (May 6, 1913—Sept 4, 1968) was an American freelance photographer.

== Early life and education ==
Carter Jones was born on May 6, 1913, in Washington, D.C., and attended St. Bernard Prep School in Cullman, Alabama and Mercer University in Macon, Georgia. After studying creative writing at Princeton University he spent eight years in the 1940s as an advertising copywriter for New York City agencies.

== Commercial photographer ==
In 1948, he moved to Paris to study art at the Académie Julian, and a friend gave him a Rolleiflex camera that he continued to use throughout his career. His street photography, a photo essay of a beggar and nuns (shot from the window of his flat) was published in Life and reproduced in the US Camera Annual of 1954. The notoriety gained him freelance work, mainly shooting fashion, for Paris Match, Femina, Le Figaro, Le Jardin des Modes and The Illustrated London News. He met Manine Auroux, an employee of Jacques Fath, whom he married in Paris in 1949 and with whom he returned to the USA, where she was granted permanent residency in 1953. There, he continued in commercial photography, including human interest stories with publication also in photography annuals of the period.

The couple had five children; two girls and three boys, including a boy and girl from Jones' previous marriage, and the children appeared in many of Jones' photographs, including in advertising for Scott Paper Products, Canada Dry, Total Cereal and others, and US Camera 1962, p. 155, features his picture showing brothers playing in the hay, a photo also used in Caroline Kennedy's A Patriot's Handbook.

== Recognition ==
In 1955, Edward Steichen, director of the photography department of the Museum of Modern Art, selected one of Jones’ photographs for the world-touring exhibition The Family of Man that was seen by 9 million visitors. Jones’ photograph shows three of his own children climbing in, and enveloped by, the bright, leafy canopy of a large tree. His work was also exhibited in a reconfiguration of Steichen's show in 1959 as part of the American National Exhibition held in Moscow at Sokolniki Park.

== Death ==
On September 4, 1968, Carter Jones was killed in a plane crash while returning from an assignment in a single-engine Piper Cherokee being piloted through dense fog by aerial photographer Louis Haslbeck, the owner of the Manahawkin Airport where they were trying to land. The aircraft clipped 35-foot cedar trees and plowed into a bog. His wife, waiting for him in her car, heard the impact. He was 57 years old.
