= Bill Rauhauser =

American photographer and educator

- Born: Bill (Warren C.) Rauhauser; August 14, 1918; Detroit
- Died: July 29, 2017 (aged 98); Detroit
- Resting place: Detroit
- Occupations: Photographer, professor of photography
- Years active: 1938–2017
- Spouse: Doris L. Rauhauser
- Children: 2
- Awards: 2014 Kresge Eminent Artist

Bill (Warren C.) Rauhauser (August 14, 1918 – July 29, 2017) was an American photographer and educator who documented the city of Detroit from the 1940s.

== Biography ==
Bill (Warren C.) Rauhauser was born in Detroit in 1918. His father was a technical draftsman descended from Pennsylvania Germans who arrived in the United States in the eighteenth century. He received a bachelor's degree in Architectural Engineering in 1943 from the University of Detroit and spent 25 years in the engineering field, working for Holcroft & Company (1943-1959), ITE Circuit Breaker Company (1964-1968), and Chief Engineer at Keystone Corporation, a division of Avis Corporation.

He bought his first camera, the moulded-bakelite Univex Model A, for 39 cents by mail order in 1933 to use for a hobby, and from 1938 attended the Silhouette Camera Club meetings held above the Detroit camera shop of the same name. He discovered his calling in photography on a business trip to New York in 1947 where he saw an exhibition by French photographer Henri Cartier-Bresson at the Museum of Modern Art in Manhattan and was inspired by the photographer's statement in the accompanying booklet; “Photography isn’t a hobby. The art is in the seeing.”

Rauhauser soon took up 35mm photography, first with an Argus model A (made in Ann Arbor), then with a Leica, and using that faster format, then still considered 'miniature', strove to capture the energy, people and personalities of the Detroit streets as the city rallied to meet pivotal industrial demand during World War II. When it became the centre of automobile manufacture in the United States his street photography incidentally documented the massive urban renewal projects and social changes that were prevalent in Detroit from the 1950s to 1970s, before a late decline in population and the largest municipal bankruptcy in American history led to a catastrophic collapse of its economy.

Among the subjects of Rauhauser's portraits of Detroit personalities are Dr. Ernst Scheyer, art collectors Gertrude Kasle, Kurt Michel and Albert H. Ratcliffe, and bibliophile Charles E. Feinberg.

== Recognition ==
In 1951 Edward Steichen came to Detroit to speak at the Detroit Institute of Arts (DIA) on the Photo-Secession and to promote his upcoming Museum of Modern Art exhibit The Family of Man. He invited local photographers to submit work and chose one of Rauhauser's photos, his amusing Three on a Bench, Detroit River (c.1952) depicting a serviceman accompanied by two women, photographed from behind, for the traveling exhibition that was seen by 9 million visitors and perpetuated in a catalogue that has ever been out of print. The recognition prompted Rauhauser to devote himself full-time to the profession of street photographer and educator.

On May 24, 1964, with his associates, Jack Vastbinder, Max Scholz, Russ Pfeiffer and Eizo Nishiura, Rauhauser opened the Group Four Gallery in Detroit dedicated to photography. Exhibitions included work of Robert Boram, an automotive photographer for the Ford Motor Co., Joe Clark, Andee Seeger and Robert Wilson, among others.

From 1968, after the closure of Group Four, Rauhauser worked with Willis F. Woods, then director of the Detroit Institute of Arts, to expand its commitment to photography, helped to curate exhibitions as a volunteer assistant alongside head of the print department Ellen Sharp, and catalogued the museum's collection.

== Teaching ==
Rauhauser was hired as a faculty member at the College for Creative Studies in 1970 by Bob Vigiletti, chair of photography at what was then the Art School for the Detroit Society of Arts and Crafts and for more than 30 years taught historical, theoretical and technical courses, with one year as guest lecturer at the University of Michigan in Ann Arbor, and four years at Wayne State University. Well respected as an educator, he said;

It doesn't mean having the right exposure. Seeing is important. Recognizing significance is what counts. Your involvement in general culture is what matters. If I could start all over again, this is how I would teach — two-thirds of an artist's education should be in history and literature. If you don't have it, you will miss the shot.

His alumni include Michelle Andonian, Gene Meadows, Nancy Barr, and Carlos Diaz.

Aside from street photography, and inspired by his teaching, he branched out into industrial and construction site imagery from the 1960s, and then more conceptual projects; his Pipe series made in the mid 1970s that simply shows cropped, deadpan details of plumbing, the series Object, Cubist Still Life and Temples and Tombs which evolve as high contrast illusionistic abstractions and mechanical or geometric still life objects against a stark black background of the 1980s. The latter have companion pieces that exploit perceptually puzzling geometric details in interiors.

== Legacy ==
In 2014, Rauhauser was selected for a prestigious Kresge Eminent Artist Award and $50,000 prize for his lifelong dedication to photography and on Thursday, April 9, 2015, his award was recognised with a display during Art X Detroit 2015 Opening Night festivities at The Museum of Contemporary Art Detroit (MOCAD).

In retirement Rauhauser was appointed Professor Emeritus by the College for Creative Studies and served as Artist Advisor for the Board of Directors of the Department of Prints, Drawings and Photographs of the Detroit Institute of Arts. He self-published a number of books assisted for some by his close friend Mary Desjarlais, and continued to photograph up to the end of his life, though his output slowed in the 1980s after he became the sole caregiver for his invalid wife.

At 98, he suffered a stroke after doing a photo shoot in Detroit that was filmed for WDIV-TV (Channel 4), and died in a coma the day after, on July 29, 2017. His son Russ, two grandchildren: Amanda and Kevin and daughter Nancy survived him. In a press release, the DIA said it was "grateful for his tremendous contribution to the art of photography.”

Rauhauser is represented by the Hill Gallery in Birmingham.

== Publications ==
- Desjarlais, Mary; Rauhauser, Bill (2010), Bill Rauhauser: 20th Century Photography in Detroit, Cambourne Publishing, ISBN 978-0-9740355-1-2
- Desjarlais, Mary; Rauhauser, Bill (2008), Beauty on the streets of Detroit : a history of the housing market in Detroit, Mary Desjarlais, ISBN 978-0-9817517-0-2
- Rauhauser, Bill; Magid, Martin (2003), Bob-Lo revisited, Press Lorentz, ISBN 978-0-9723926-0-0
- Desjarlais, Mary; Rauhauser, Bill; Thomas, John Baldwin, 1857-1937; Meadows, Gene (2000), Detroit revisited : the twentieth century in photographs by John Baldwin Thomas, Bill Rauhauser and Gene Meadows, Group 3 Pub, ISBN 978-0-9702644-0-4
- Lewis, David Lanier; Rauhauser, Bill; Detroit Institute of Arts (1996), The car and the camera : The Detroit School of Automotive Photography, Detroit Institute of Arts in association with Wayne State University Press, ISBN 978-0-8143-2674-9

== Papers and articles ==
- 'Photography and Reform: A Dissenting View' Michigan Photography Journal Issue 6, 1993
- 'Focus on Photography – Art and Photojournalism, 1839-1989' (Special publication for The Sesquicentennial of Photography) Detroit Free Press, Detroit, Michigan, 1989
- 'Detroit Revisited Group 3' Royal Oak, Michigan, 2000
- 'Bob-Lo Revisited' Press Lorentz Ann Arbor, Michigan, 2003
- 'Group Four, 1964-1968' The Photogram Volume 32, No. 2, September–October, 2004. Michigan Photographic Historical Society, Ferndale, Michigan
- 'On Street Photography' The Photogram Volume 33, No. 5, April–May, 2006. Michigan Photographic Historical Society, Ferndale, Michigan
- Detroit Auto Show Images of the 1970s Cambourne Publishing Ferndale, Michigan, 2007
- 'Photography: Truth and Fact' The Photogram Volume 34, No. 4, February–March, 2007. Michigan Photographic Historical Society, Ferndale, Michigan.

== Collections ==
Detroit Institute of Arts holds a large archive of his work, more than 400 photographs, which in 2008 Rauhauser donated to the museum in the memory of his late wife, Doris Rauhauser, who died in 2007. His work is also included in the Museum of Modern Art, New York.
