= Gottfried Rainer =

Austrian photojournalist

Gottfried "Jeff" Rainer was an Austrian photojournalist active from the 1950s to the 1970s.

== Training under the Marshall Plan ==
Beginning in 1948, the Marshall Plan conducted its activity in Western Europe, including Austria. Until 1954, under Yoichi Okamoto, the Vienna Bureau of the United States Information Service Pictorial Section trained local photographers to produce publicity imagery. Okamoto, a photographer himself and later the first "White House photographer" under President Lyndon B. Johnson, taught a cohort of outstanding young Austrian photo artists, among them Gottfried "Jeff" Rainer, Franz Kraus, Ferdinand Schreiber, Alfred Huttar, Leo Lebduska, Hans Nagl, Wilhlem (Will) Appelt, Heinrich (Heini) Mayr, Fritz Maier, Martin Schindelar, Paul Schütz, Alfred (Fred) Riedmann, Alfred Hohenfels and Johann Krumbach. Some of these photographers, in turn, were influential in the United States, such as Ernst Haas, Heute and Heini Mayr with the Salzburger Nachrichten from 1945 to 1955, later working for Time and Life in New York.

== Recognition ==
In 1955 his photograph of a father practicing his clarinet accompanied by his young son playing a recorder was chosen by Edward Steichen for the world-touring Museum of Modern Art exhibition The Family of Man, seen by 9 million visitors. It was included in the widely distributed catalogue which is still in print.

Rainer, who had joined the American Picture Service at the end of January 1947, after 1955 continued to work as photographer for the American Embassy in Vienna, which continued to operate a photographic department at based at Schmidtgasse 14 in Vienna's 8th district under the name Regional Program Office (R.P.O.). Rainer remained as its head, responsible for the production and distribution of visual propaganda materials in the Eastern Bloc countries. The dissolution of R.P.O. took place in 1991 and unfortunately all materials were destroyed.

== Commercial photographer ==
Rainer remained in Austria and continued to work as an advertising and publicity photographer into at least the 1970s, producing portraits, product shots and pictures for publications including the 250,000-issue brochure "Travel instead of racing" promoting the "autowander route" and the Felbertauern Tunnel.
