= Eiju Otaki =

Eiju Otaki (Japanese: 大滝英二) (born 1932) was a Japanese photographer and photojournalist active in the 1950s.

== Recognition ==
In 1955 Edward Steichen selected Otaki's 1953 photograph of a baby asleep in a sling on mother's back for the world-touring Museum of Modern Art exhibition The Family of Man, seen by 9 million visitors. The photograph had been previously published in Ars Camera (Kamera, カメラ, published by Ars アルス) one of the older and longer running of Japanese camera magazines, and was frequently reproduced in publications on child-rearing.
