= Homer Page =

American documentary photographer

Homer Page (1918–1985) was an American documentary photographer whose most famous photographs were taken in New York City in 1949–1950, after he received a grant from the Guggenheim Foundation.

Page was born in Oakland, California, and studied art and social psychology at the University of California, graduating in 1940. He worked in the shipyards in the Oakland-San Francisco Bay Area during World War II. His neighbor and later his mentor, photographer Dorothea Lange, encouraged him to take up photography in 1944. By 1947, he was featured in a major show at the Museum of Modern Art in New York.

Page received a Guggenheim Fellowship in 1949 and spent a year documenting modern urban culture, primarily by photographing people on the streets of New York City. Most of his subjects appear unaware of his presence.

Some of Page's photographs were included in Edward Steichen's landmark Family of Man exhibition at the Museum of Modern Art in 1955. His photographs appeared in publications including Harper's Magazine, and books such as The Little World of Laos. In 1966, he published a collection of his photographs, titled Puerto Rico: The Quiet Revolution.

Page produced several photo stories for the World Health Organization from 1957 to 1960. Most of his photographs focused on health in the United States, but he also traveled to Latin America, Asia and Africa to photograph topics including rural health, yaws and trachoma.

The bulk of Page's career was spent as a magazine photographer, and, as a result, few of his photographs were in private hands and his work was largely forgotten by the time of his death in 1985, at the age of 67.

Keith F. Davis, Curator of Photography at the Nelson-Atkins Museum of Art, while researching and writing the first edition of An American Century of Photography, published in 1995, became aware of Page's non-magazine work. Davis searched for Page's photographs, leading to the discovery of a "lost" photographic treasure. After negotiations with the Page estate, Nelson-Atkins purchased about 100 prints for the museum's Hallmark Photographic Collection, including many that were one of a kind.
