= Eugene Vernon Harris =

American photographer

Eugene Harris
- Born: Eugene Vernon Harris; February 8, 1913; Kenmare, North Dakota
- Died: May 15, 1978 (aged 65); Chicago
- Known for: Photography
- Spouse: Mary Elizabeth Dávalos Scott

Eugene Vernon Harris (February 8, 1913 – May 15, 1978) was an American photographer. His award-winning 1954 photo Flute Player was prominently featured in Edward Steichen's The Family of Man exhibition.

== Early life ==
Eugene Vernon Harris was born in Kenmare, North Dakota on February 8, 1913. He grew up in Minnesota and attended the State Teacher's College in Moorhead, Minnesota, graduating with a bachelor's degree in education in 1937. After pursuing graduate study in geography at The Ohio State University, he left his Masters thesis unfinished to accept a position as clerk for the American Embassy in Santiago, Chile (where he had been conducting research for his Masters thesis), replacing workers who had gone to war, and beginning his first career in Foreign Service. His second Foreign Service post was in Buenos Aires, Argentina, where he met and married Mary Elizabeth Davalos. They were sent to India, where Harris became Vice Consul, and the family welcomed a daughter, Elizabeth. A second daughter, Jeannette, was born during Harris's service in Greece in 1953.

== Career ==
1953 proved a substantial turning point in Harris's professional life; he left the service (was considered a pinko) and began pursuing professional opportunities in photography, having been an avid amateur photographer during his college years and early career. He spent ten years working for geographer Clarence W. Sorensen, traveling the world and taking pictures as Chief Geography Photographer for the Silver Burdett Publishing Company. Between 1964 and 1975, Harris continued working in geography, producing photos and filmstrips for Encyclopædia Britannica Educational Corporation. His professional training in geography and experience in Foreign Service informed Harris's artistic career and influenced what his eye preserved on film. He was reputedly humble and had little interest in self-promotion.

Throughout his twenty-four year career, traveling the world on photo assignments, Harris documented cultures, qualities, and narratives of particular time and place that were distinct, and yet common in fundamental human experience, reflective of exhibition concepts. Harris never became a central part of photographic collectives or schools significant at the time (Magnum, Time Life, for example); however, Harris was in contact with and respected, at least to some degree, by major figures in the field (MoMA curator Edward Steichen and Magnum Photos figurehead Werner Bischof, among them).

== Flute Player and The Family of Man ==
Harris's early photography career capitalized on success of his 1954 award-winning Flute Player photo (also titled The Piper and Peruvian Boy With Flute in various places). This image was taken during professional travel to areas surrounding Pisac, Peru and Machu Picchu. He won a cash prize for the Flute Player through the International Picture Contest, awarded by Popular Photography magazine in 1954. The most significant commendation for the photo, however, was its use in Edward Steichen's 1955 exhibition The Family of Man at the Museum of Modern Art in New York City. Harris's Flute Player image had a participatory role in the exhibition as it was the sole recurring image. Appearing five times, the photo functioned as a leitmotif or capstone image, helping to create a cyclical statement. Steichen had originally conceived the exhibition to be presented with music and it was wired for sound; upon seeing Harris's Flute Player photo, Steichen and exhibition assistant Wayne F. Miller decided to use the Flute Player image in place of sound.

The Family of Man is a substantial and prominent exhibition in photographic history; it reached an estimated nine million viewers in its New York showing and subsequent world tour. Now permanently housed in the Château de Clervaux in Luxembourg, country of Steichen's birth, the Family of Man exhibition was added to the Register of the Memory of the World by the UNESCO in 2003. It also exists in popular book form.

== Death and legacy ==
Harris intended to return to his ranch in Salta, Argentina upon retirement; however, he died of a heart attack in Chicago on May 15, 1978.

Harris's collection of 130,000+ images along with substantial video footage now resides at the American Geographical Society Library (AGSL) at the University of Wisconsin-Milwaukee.
