= Carmel Vitullo =

American photographer (born 1925)

Carmel Vitullo (born July 16, 1925) is an American street photographer whose imagery of Rhode Island have been acquired for a number of collections.

== Biography ==
Carmel Vitullo was born in Providence, Rhode Island, on July 16, 1925, into the small Italian community of Federal Hill. After high school Vitullo enrolled in a major in painting at the Rhode Island School of Design (RISD), but abandoned it for the medium of photography about which she was more passionate. In further study at the New York Institute of Photography she discovered the work of Henri Cartier Bresson and she continued to be an exponent and practitioner of street photography. A majority of her photographs depict the neighbourhood of Rhode Island in the 1950s and the first Newport Jazz Festival. She ran a studio in a South Water Street warehouse in the 1960s. Her commercial practice was in portrait and industrial photography and in her sixties after her retirement, and while living in North Providence, she was working as a producer in cable television.

== Recognition ==
In the 1950s, Vitullo approached Edward Steichen with her portfolio. He selected her photograph of displaced refugees at Grand Central Terminal en route to a relocation centre, for the Museum of Modern Art world-touring exhibition The Family of Man, which was seen by 9 million visitors. Her print was exhibited in the section 'Rebels' at the end of a row of six, hard against the adjoining wall, in sympathy with the entrapment of the subjects who are seated, frieze-like, along a bench parallel to the picture plane. Stacked on a cart in front of them are their suitcases labeled with stickers of the NCWC (National Catholic Welfare Conference), the social Catholic organization helping immigrants relocate to the United States and confirming their identity as immigrants. Disquieting, confusing spots of light from the skylight fall across the scene and add to the pervasive anxiety evident in the expressions of the men, women, and children. The inclusion in The Family of Man and its accompanying catalogue (which has never been out of print) came as a breakthrough for Vitullo. Since then, she has exhibited alongside Harry Callahan, O. Winston Link and others and her work has been collected by major institutions.

== Exhibitions ==
- 1955: The Family of Man, world-touring group exhibition, Museum of Modern Art.
- 1958, 26 November–18 January: Photographs from the Museum Collection, Museum of Modern Art.
- 1959, Jun 1-Jul 31: Photographs by Winfield Parks and Carmel Vitullo Rhode Island Museum of Art
- 2006, 1–31 March: Carmel Vitullo: Italian Sojourn 1966, Bert Gallery, Rhode Island
- 2006, 1 December–25 February: Urban America, 1930–1970, RISD Museum of Art
- 2009, June–August: Block Island Historical Society
- 2009, 14 July–28 August: Documenting a Moment, a Place, an Era - Photographs by O. Winston Link (Louisiana 1937-1941) and Carmel Vitullo (Rhode Island 1950 - 1960), Bert Gallery, 540 South Water St., Providence
- 2011, 28 September – 12 November: The Artist's Venice, paintings by Americans Mabel Woodward, Henry Kenyon, Gordon Peers and others, with street photographs by Carmel Vitullo, Bert Gallery, Rhode Island
- 2017, to 27 March: Carmel Vitullo: Italo-American, Bert Gallery, Rhode Island
- 2017, 24 May - 30 June: Oakland Beach in the 1960′s: Art, Society, and Nature, Warwick Center for the Arts, 3259 Post Rd., Warwick
- 2019, 4 May–18 July: The Providence Album, Vol 1, Carmel Vitullo and Harry Callahan, Carriage House Gallery, John Nicholas Brown Center for Public Humanities and Cultural Heritage, 357 Benefit Street, Providence

== Collections ==
- Museum of Modern Art
- Rhode Island School of Design Museum,
- Bert Gallery,
- Newport Art Museum
- Block Island Historical Society
- Château de Clervaux
