= Étienne Sved =

Étienne Sved (1914–1996) was a Hungarian-born French-naturalised photographer and poster artist.

== Early life ==
Étienne Sved was born Süsz István in Székesfehérvar, Hungary, in 1914, changing his name on 9 June 1947.

Rejected by the art schools of Budapest because he was Jewish, in 1930 Sved studied drawing at Atelier Budapest, a school of graphic arts founded in Budapest by Bauhaus teachers fleeing Nazi Germany.

== Exile and work in Egypt during WWII ==
In face of the rising threat of Nazism, Sved fled to Egypt in 1938, traveling the country on a donkey, touring ancient funerary sites on the banks of the Nile, and eventually befriending Abbot Drioton, director of the Cairo Museum. Sved remained in the country until 1946 and through his friendship with the writer and intellectual Georges Henein, founder of the surrealist Jama’at al-Fann Wa al-Hurriyyah (Art and Liberty Group) active 1939 - 1945, Sved worked as a photographer at the French paper Le Progrés Egyptien. In 1945, when Sved executed a series of posters for a local brand of cigarettes called Setos, Henein was the director of the company in Gianaclis that owned it.

Sved published many satirical drawings before discovering photography, and while in Cairo, he created a series of anti-Nazi caricatures that were republished many years later in a bound volume titled Adolf ou à quand le crèpuscule des odieux? His photographic work illustrated Jean Cocteau's Maalesh, a journal inspired by Cocteau's 1949 stay in Egypt.

Sved’s eagerness to document the local Arab and Bedouin populations, rather than the French colonialists, led him to create an impressive collection of images of artefacts and street photographs of great historical value, which appear notably in a work published in 1954, Egypt face to face, with a text by Tristan Tzara for whom it became his most popular book during his lifetime, selling over 20,000 copies.

== In France ==
Étienne Sved departed Egypt for France in 1946, and the following year married. He became a naturalised French citizen in 1949. He continued his photographic career while successfully pursuing a career as a graphic designer in advertising.

In 1952, he travelled to Algiers to produce, over a six-week stay, 600 illustrations for the album Algiers, 1951, a country in waiting with texts by Benjamin Stora, and two Algerian writers, Malek Alloula and Maïssa Bey.

In 1955 a photograph of an Egyptian woman bearing a water jar was selected for the world-touring exhibition The Family of Man by Edward Steichen, curator of photography at MoMA.

In 1962, he set up a publishing house and moved to Haute Provence producing Provence des campaniles (1972), which won the Nadar prize in 1990. He continued his work as a publisher and photographer until his death in 1996.

== Legacy ==
In 2003, the Nicéphore-Niépce museum acquired the Middle Eastern photographic collection of Étienne Sved, comprising more than 3,000 negatives and vintage prints, and mounted a major retrospective in the same year in Manosque. The following year, Denon museum in Chalon-sur-Saône showed Moolesh, seventy-five photographs taken during his early years in Egypt along with memorabilia including a self-portrait of Sved from around 1940; his 1944 press card for Le Progrés Egyplien; and the Hungarian civil status certificate recording his name change from Istvan Süsz on 9 June 1947.

== Publications ==
- Art égyptien (1950) Text by Étienne Drioton (1889-1961), photographs by Étienne Sved.
- Étienne Sved: East meets West (1943) Cairo: R. Schnindler.
- Étienne Sved, Tristan Tzara (1896-1963c) L'Égypte face à face (Egypt face to face), 2nd ed. Pierrevert : Sved 1988
- Nice in full light (1976) editions: Saint Michel-l'Observatoire / Paris: Sved, 1972
- Étienne Sved, Malek Alloula (1937-2015), Maïssa Bey, Benjamin Stora Alger 1951: un pays dans l'attente (Alger 1951: a country in waiting) Algiers: Barzakh, Barbentane : Équinoxe, 1996.
- Étienne Sved, Jean Cocteau (1889-1963) Maalesh. Manosque: Bec up ed.; [Chalon-sur-Saône]: Nicephore Niepce Museum, 2003
- Pièges et contradictions du présent / [by] Jean Maillé; [and] Étienne Sved / [Paris] : Éditions Sved, [1972]

== Publications about Étienne Sved ==
- Mars, Christiane; Pavia, Fabienne; Sved, Yvett (2003) Étienne Sved Photographiste 1914 - 1996. MUS Publishing, Hilton, New York

== Exhibitions ==
- Maalesh: un asile photographique au Moyen-Orient 1938-1946, Étienne Sved Retrospective at Musée Nicéphore Niépce, 28 quai des Messageries 71100 Chalon-sur-Saone Manosque 19 Jun – 19 Sep 2004.
- 2017-2018 Art et liberté : rupture, war and Surrealism in Egypt (1938-1948) included examples of Sved's photographs and toured the following venues;
  - Tate Liverpool, Liverpool, 10 Nov 2017-Mar 11 2018;
  - Centre National d'Art et de Culture Georges Pompidou, Paris, 19 October 2016 – 9 January 2017;
  - Museo Nacional Centro de Arte Reina Sofia, Madrid, 14 February 2017 – 28 May 2017;
  - Kunstsammlung Nordrhein-Westfalen, Düsseldorf, K21 Ständehaus, 15 August 2017 – 15 October 2017.

== Website ==
http://www.sved.free.fr was created in May 2002 by the association "The Friends of Étienne Sved" for the conservation, the promotion and the diffusion of the artist’s work.
