= Ted Castle (photographer) =

American photojournalist

Ted Castle (1918–2000) was an American photojournalist and member of Magnum agency.

== Early career ==
Ted Castle was born in 1918 in Los Angeles. He wanted to be an artist as a child and was given a Kodak camera at age 12. He graduated from Los Angeles High School (1936) then studied engineering at the University of California, Berkeley (1936–39) and worked for Douglas Aircraft in Santa Monica. During World War II, he served in the Army Tank Corps (1943–44) and the Air Corps (1945) in the Philippines. On return, he was employed as an engineer with Bethlehem Steel but was frustrated by the lack of human interaction, so he quit and signed up for a photography course in Santa Barbara at Brooks institute 1946–1948. There he learned photographic processes and aesthetics, and after a year developed the ambition to become a photographer for Life magazine, with the chance to meet people and learn languages.

Castle took his first job related to photography with News Enterprise Associates (NEA) on the teletype desk, midnight to 8 am, choosing stories for which he commissioned photographs for their illustration. NEA ran Acme Newspictures. He left after encountering the racial prejudice of the organization in censoring his image of a blind black university student at her graduation.

== Photojournalism ==
In 1948 Castle, having saved $1000, hitchhiked to New York, took a small apartment, and became a member of New York's Photo League. He sought an interview with the director of photography at the Museum of Modern Art, Edward Steichen who, on viewing his portfolio told him to go back to engineering. Castle recalled;

I walked out of there and said to myself, 'I'm not ever going to give up until I get some of my pictures into the Museum of Modern Art.'

Castle joined Magnum Photos (1950–51). Steichen remained a mentor and assisted him in obtaining work for the American Friends Service Committee in the 1950s in Austria, Germany, in Ortona, Italy with the Save the Children Fund, and also in Spain. There, he assisted W. Eugene Smith who had preceded him across the Atlantic by plane while Castle went by ship and arrived in early January 1950 at Southampton. In the village of Deleitosa in Extremadura, they worked on Smith's classic Life essay ‘Spanish Village’ over May 5–7 July 1950.

Before Castle's departure for Europe Steichen had advised, 'Now don't forget, you get close in on your subject and don't do any cropping when you get back to develop them.' In 1952/3 working out of Paris, he saw Detective Story about officer working with underprivileged and wondered should he go into social service, but decided his photography could serve a humanitarian purpose. Later, his conviction was borne out when he followed Steichen's advice; two of his images from the European work were shown in Steichen's world-touring The Family of Man that was seen by 9 million visitors. Both are tightly cropped; a contentedly smiling Austrian mother and daughter embracing, and a pair of gap-toothed German peasant women laughing. In a 1994 interview, he remarked that;

Photojournalism is an art of being able to ‘feel’ an image and then to snap the picture.

Other subjects include the NBC Orchestra at Carnegie Hall in an appearance without their retired conductor Arturo Toscanini, the Grand Canyon's Havasupai Indians, African drummer and dancers in the Belgian Congo, and for TWA and Pepsi he photographed black goldminers in Johannesberg, emphasising their dignity and strength of personality.

== Technique ==
Though he first used a Rolleiflex, Castle preferred 35mm for speed of use and a more direct vision, and for the camera's size, which enabled him to conceal it when necessary.

== Stills photographer ==
Castle was stills photographer on Hollywood productions Man on a Tightrope (dir. Elia Kazan, 1953) filmed in Bavaria, and Oklahoma! (1955).

== Magazine work ==
Castle's first magazine job was for Fortune, photographing the shipping industry and he freelanced for many, including for Life and Business Week. His portraits include some celebrity subjects including Eleanore Roosevelt at the United Nations in Long Island, Seretse Khama, violinist Yehudi Menuhin, and editor Geoffrey H. White.

== Later career ==
Moving to Sausalito in later years, he turned to commercial photography, making a picture of the first microchip using an ant to show scale, worked for television in Los Angeles, and photographed accident victims for their lawyers.

== Exhibitions ==
=== Solo ===
- Ted Castle – Nomadic Eye, California Museum of Art, Santa Rosa, 1997

=== Group ===
- The Family of Man, Museum of Modern Art, New York 1955
- Serious Play: Design In Mid-century America, May 5, 2019 – August 25, 2019, Denver Art Museum
