= Rudolf Busler =

German photographer and cinematographer

Rudolf Busler was a German news photographer and cinematographer active from the 1950s to the 1970s.

== Photographer ==
In 1955 Busler's exuberant photograph of German boogie-woogie dancers in full swing, shot with flash and blur from nearly floor-level, was included by Edward Steichen, with the work of ten other German photographers, for the Museum of Modern Art’s world-touring exhibition The Family of Man, seen by 9 million visitors. There is evidence that Steichen found Busler’s image at the Institut fur Bildjournalismus, a German photojournalism institute in Munich.

== Cinematographer ==
Busler went on to become cinematographer on documentaries and short features for screen and television. In 1967 he was behind the camera in Rome and Lazio in Italy filming the 45 minute black-and-white Film in Rom ('Cinema in Rome') directed by Alois Kolb. It screened in West Germany on 9 April 1967 by Bayerischer Rundfunk (BR) and featured interviews with Italian directors and actors Marco Bellocchio, Marcello Mastroianni, Pier Paolo Pasolini and Romano Scavolini.

Busler was Director of Photography on the 1969 18-minute Freitag Morgen ('Friday morning'), directed by Peter Kölsch who also wrote the screenplay, showing a mother’s (Nora Pap) anxiety about her 12-year-old boy (Andy Pap) riding to school for the first time on his new bicycle, and the triumph of self-confidence that the adventure brings. For Susanne Fuhrmeister’s Der Schwarze ('The Black Man'), a 47 minute German 1974 psychological drama starring Rita Russek, Joost Siedhoff and Henry van Lyck, Busler was once again Director of Photography.
