= Missouri Photo Workshop =

Photojournalism school based at the Missouri School of Journalism

- Motto: Ostende veritatem cum a camera
- Motto in English: Show truth with a camera
- Type: Private
- Established: 1949
- Affiliations: Missouri School of Journalism
- Director: Jim Curley, David Rees
- Academic staff: 12
- Students: 50
- Location: Columbia, Missouri, United States; 38°56′55″N 92°19′45″W
- Campus: Rural
- Colours: Red and Black
- Website: mophotoworkshop.org

The Missouri Photo Workshop is an annual week-long photojournalism workshop based in different small towns throughout Missouri. Founded in 1949 by the "Father of Photojournalism" Cliff Edom along with American economist, federal government official, and photographer Roy Stryker and photographer Russell Lee, the workshop originally sought to instruct others in photojournalism based on the "gritty, content-rich photographs" produced by the pre-World War II (pre-1939) Farm Security Administration, a United States government effort during the Great Depression to combat American rural poverty. Following Edom's credo - "Show truth with a camera. Ideally truth is a matter of personal integrity. In no circumstances will a posed or faked photograph be tolerated." - each workshop originates in a different small town in Missouri, which is used as a backdrop for attendees from the United States and other countries to work on photograph storytelling methods such as research, observation, and timing. Missouri Photo Workshop faculty members have included the White House's first photo editor and NPPA Picture Editor of the Year Sandra Eisert and other prominent photojournalists.

== Faculty and students ==
This list of Missouri Photo Workshop faculty includes current, former, and deceased lecturers at the annual Missouri Photo Workshop (MPW), an annual week-long photojournalism school founded in 1949 and based in Lee Hills Hall at the Missouri School of Journalism in Columbia, Missouri, United States.

Name	Last MPW (as of 2012)	Publication represented	MPW workshop numbers	Notes
Cliff Edom	38	Missouri Photo Workshop	MPW 1-38	Co-Director
Jim Curley	64	Missouri Photo Workshop	MPW 53-64	Co-Director
Sam Abell	40	Freelance	MPW 40	
Bill Allard	20	Freelance	MPW 20	
Nancy Andrews	54	Detroit Free Press	MPW 54	
Howard Chapnick	44	Black Star Publishing	MPW 18, 20-22, 24-28, 30, 33-35, 40, 44	
Rich Clarkson	46	National Geographic, Denver Post, Topeka Capital Journal	MPW 14, 22-35, 37-46	
Jodi Cobb	38	National Geographic	MPW 33, 38	
Carolyn Cole	61	Los Angeles Times	MPW 61	
Harold Corsini	1	Freelance	MPW 1	
Bruce Dale	26	National Geographic	MPW 26	
Barbara Davidson	63	Los Angeles Times	MPW 63	
Penny De Los Santos	61	Freelance	MPW 61	
Sandra Eisert	52	San Jose Mercury News, The White House, Associated Press, The Washington Post, Minneapolis Star Tribune	MPW 27-33, 35-37, 41-46, 51, 52	
J. Eyerman	14	Life Magazine	MPW 14	
Robert E. Gilka	46	National Geographic, Milwaukee Journal	MPW 7-9, 11, 14, 16, 17, 20, 22, 24-32, 34-36, 40, 42, 46	
MaryAnne Golon	62	TIME Magazine, AARP	MPW 51, 52, 54-60, 62	
Larry Harper	26	Missouri Ruralist	MPW 26	
Abigail Heyman	39	International Center of Photography	MPW 39	
John Isaac	61	Freelance	MPW 61	
Lynn Johnson	51	Freelance	MPW 51	
Tom Keane	22	Wilmington News Journal	MPW 22	
Kim Komenich	64	San Jose State University	MPW 46-56, 58, 60-64	
Brian Lanker	30	Topeka Capital Journal, The Register Guard	MPW 23-26, 30	
Russell Lee	29	Freelance	MPW 2-8, 10, 11, 13-16, 28, 29	
Bob Lynn	39	Virginia Pilot & Ledger Star	MPW 39	
Robert Madden	29	National Geographic	MPW 24, 29	
Ron Mann	38	Orange County Register	MPW 38	
Michele McDonald	51	Freelance	MPW 46, 48-51	
Wayne Miller	27	Magnum Photos	MPW 27	
Margaret O'Connor	55	New York Times	MPW 55	
Yoichi R. Okamoto	13	U.S. Press Service, United States Information Agency	MPW 9-13	
Randy Olson	64	National Geographic	MPW 42, 48-50, 53-57, 59, 60-64	
Eli Reed	43	Magnum Photos	MPW 42, 43	
Rita Reed	60	University of Missouri, Minneapolis Star Tribune	MPW 44-49, 53, 60	
Arthur Rothstein	8	Look Magazine	MPW 6-8	
Kurt Szafranski	3	Black Star Publishing	MPW 3	
Rick Shaw	64	Pictures of the Year International	MPW 61, 64	
Arthur Siegel	4	Chicago Institute of Design	MPW 3, 4	
Henry Smith	4	Indiana University	MPW 4	
Zoe Smith	43	University of Missouri	MPW 43	
Maggie Steber	61	Freelance	MPW 43, 47, 56, 58, 61	
William H. Strode, III	35	Louisville Courier-Journal	MPW 19-21, 23-32, 35	
Roy E. Stryker	9	Standard Oil Company of New Jersey	MPW 1, 9	
Arthur Witman	19	St. Louis Post-Dispatch	MPW 17-19	
George Yates	2	Des Moines Register	MPW 2	

== Selected publication ==
- Cliff Edom (1993), Small town America: the Missouri photo workshops, 1949-1991, Fulcrum Publishing, p. 236, OCLC 231997773

== See also ==
- Maine Media Workshops, non-profit educational organization
- Pictures of the Year International, photojournalism program affiliated with the Missouri Photo Workshop
