= Richard Shaw =

Richard Shaw may refer to:

== Art and architecture ==
- Richard Norman Shaw (1831–1912), British architect
- Richard Hussey Shaw (1832–1895), South Australian painter
- Richard J. Shaw (died 1958), American architect
- Richard Shaw (artist) (born 1941), American ceramics artist

== Entertainment ==
- Richard Shaw (actor) (1920–2010), British actor
- Bushwick Bill (Richard Stephen Shaw, 1966–2019), American rapper and member of Houston rap group Geto Boys
- Richard Shaw, British guitarist with Cradle of Filth

== Politics ==
- Richard Shaw (Dorset MP) (fl. 1533–1563), MP for Poole, Melcombe Regis and Wareham
- Richard Shaw (Liberal politician) (1825–1876), British Member of Parliament for Burnley, 1868–1876
- Richard G. Shaw (born 1943), West Virginia insurance commissioner

== Sports ==
- Ricky Shaw (born 1965), American football player
- Richard Shaw (footballer) (born 1968), English footballer and assistant manager at Coventry City

== Others ==
- Richard Shawe (fl. 1361–1403), Canon of Windsor
- Rick Shaw (journalist) (born 1956), American journalist and educator

== See also ==
- Rick Shaw (disambiguation)
