= Paul Berg (photographer) =

American photojournalist and commentator on photojournalism

Paul Berg (1913-1984) was an American photojournalist for the St. Louis, Missouri Post-Dispatch, and also wrote about the practice of photojournalism.

== Early career ==
At the University of Chicago, Paul Berg in partnership with John G. Morris issued a student newspaper Pulse in September, 1937 which they published until March, 1941, when America became involved in WW2. Berg served in the Signal Corps at the Battle of the Bulge. Pulse was a bold attempt to launch the colleagues' careers in journalism, described by Morris as; "a radically different college publication, its news section modelled on Time, a monthly survey in the manner of Fortune, and photographs of the candid-camera type, like those in Life” They and their colleagues went into professional careers: Paul Berg became a staff photographer for the St. Louis Post-Dispatch, John Corcoran for Science Illustrated, Myron Davis for Life, and David Eisendrath for the Chicago Times and New York's PM. During this time Berg married Beatrice ('Bea') Bunes Berg a freelancer who from the 1960s contributed arts criticism published in the St Louis Post-Dispatch, The Washington Post. and The New York Times

== Post-Dispatch photographer ==
After the War, Berg worked for the St. Louis Post-Dispatch New York bureau from 1952-1972, when the newspaper closed the office and recalled him to St. Louis. Commentary on his newspaper work appeared frequently in Popular Photography magazine, used as an example of a creative approach to reportage and documentary work. One writer, in discussing his picture 'School's Out’, notes that Berg was “well-known for his photographic studies on sociological questions and problems, which frequently appear in the Sunday picture section of his paper.”

The Dispatch Sunday supplement, known at different times over its nearly six decade run as PICTURES, Sunday PICTURES, Post-Dispatch Magazine, PD Magazine, and St. Louis Post-Dispatch Magazine changed from a full-size broadsheet to a tabloid format in November 1959. Julius H. Klyman, editor of the Sunday supplement used Berg's photography, as well as that of co-staffers Arthur Witman, Jack Gould, Sam Caldwell and David Gulick, to raise the profile of the magazine.

Berg retired from the Dispatch in 1978, and the couple retired to Manhattan before, around 1980, he began suffering frail health.

== Technique ==
Berg, like most news photographers of the 1940s, used a cumbersome large-format press camera even for subjects like the theatre, an example being ‘Between the Acts’, showing a wardrobe mistress adjusting a dancer's costume during final dress rehearsal of the St. Louis Municipal Opera, before the gala opening of a new season. Berg used a 4x5 Speed Graphic and Ansco Superpan Press film, hanging one flashbulb from the ceiling, and fired one on camera diffused with a handkerchief over the reflector for an exposure of 1/50 sec. a f/32. However, other shots during the same session were made on a medium-format Rolleiflex without flash.

In the 1950s Berg became an advocate for the 35mm format which was still then regarded by American picture editors as ‘miniature’, and not worthy, or capable, of quality reproduction, unlike their counterparts in Europe who had accepted the legitimacy of the smaller format before the war. Berg wrote about the value of 35mm in the thirteenth edition of the Leica Manual And Data Book in 1956. In reviewing the newly released manual, Popular Photography wrote:

In a chapter titled 'The Craft of the Photojournalist', Paul Berg…has concocted one of the finest blends of inspiration and execution that we've seen between hard covers in a very long time. Staffman Berg makes it plain that he's a 35-mm man because his Leicas let him do the job he's set out to do better and more easily than other types of available equipment. His well-defined concepts about pictures, photojournalism, and the picture story, his analysis of his own approaches to technical problems and equipment, and his auto-descriptions of a working pressman's problems and methods on assignments… are summed up in this simple statement of purpose: "Because his goal is to catch life as it is, the photojournalist interferes as little as possible with what is in front of his camera."

Nevertheless, Berg still used large format for high-definition colour photography of performances; a 1957 issue of Popular Photography devoted to the theme ‘Action’, uses Berg's example of a colour shot of flamenco dancers in full flight, for which he returns to the 4”x 5” camera (a 1940s 'Meridian') using 4 G-E #22 flash bulbs and Ektachrome Type B 200 ASA.

== Recognition ==
Berg maintained his interest in action, often tackling animal subjects from dachshunds to elephants, and performance; he was one of several photographers whose images of children dancing Ring-a-Roses were assembled in an installation in the round by curator Edward Steichen for the world-touring The Family of Man exhibition that was seen by 9 million visitors. Berg's version, shot from a high, distant vantage point overlooking a thronging city street, shows children joining hands and dancing amidst cars and parked trucks. His colleague on the Dispatch, Arthur Witman, also had a work selected for the touring exhibition.

In April 1963, he documented artist Allan Kaprow’s ‘Push and Pull: A Furniture Comedy for Hans Hofmann'. Other artist portraits he made include Roy Lichtenstein and Leo Castelli at the Leo Castelli Gallery in New York.

== Later life ==
While living in retirement in Manhattan, Berg suffered a series of small strokes during 1981/2 and a major one in late 1982, then was diagnosed with oral cancer. He died in 1984. He and Bea, who died 2 February 1990, had no children but were cared for in later life by their nephew and two nieces to whom they were close. Bea donated much of Berg's photographic archive in 1987 to the Library of Congress.

== Exhibitions ==
- Photographs from the Museum Collection, November 26, 1958 – January 18, 1959, The Museum of Modern Art, New York
- 70 Photographers Look at New York, November 27, 1957 – April 15, 1958 (picture of Lever House), The Museum of Modern Art, New York
- The Family of Man, January 24 – May 8, 1955, The Museum of Modern Art, New York
