= Bryce Watanasoponwong =

Thai-Australian photographer and gallerist

- วงกต วัฒนโสภณวงศ์
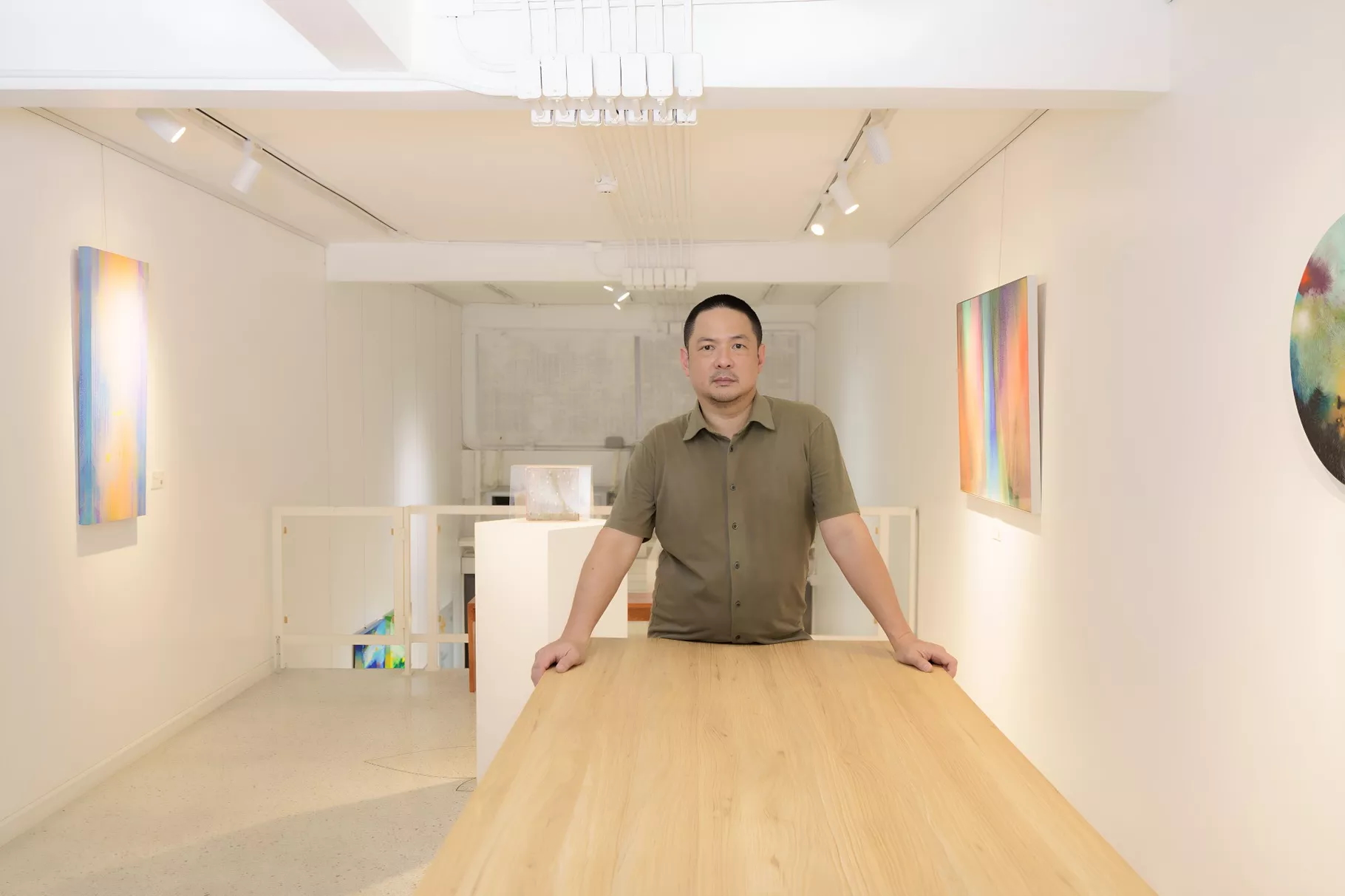
- Bryce Watanasoponwong at The Charoen AArt, Bangkok, 2025
- Born: Wongkot Watanasoponwong; Thailand
- Other names: ไบรซ์ (Bryce), กก (Gòk)
- Occupations: Photographer, gallerist
- Years active: 2019–present
- Known for: Abstract photography
- Website: www.bryce-art.com

Bryce Watanasoponwong (Thai: ไบรซ์ วัฒนโสภณวงศ์; born Wongkot Watanasoponwong, Thai: วงกต วัฒนโสภณวงศ์) is a Thai–Australian photographer and gallerist based in Bangkok. He works with abstract and experimental photography using analogue and digital methods. His name has appeared in publications including National Geographic, Creative Boom, Life Framer, L’Œil de la Photographie, Time Out Bangkok and the Bangkok Post. He has held solo exhibitions in Bangkok and has taken part in photography events such as the Missouri Photo Workshop and the Experimental Photo Festival. In 2024 he founded The Charoen AArt, a gallery in Bangkok that hosts contemporary art exhibitions.

== Early life and education ==
Watanasoponwong was born in Thailand and later lived in Australia. He is commonly known as Bryce and is also referred to by the Thai nickname Gòk (กก). Before working full-time as an artist, he held executive positions in Thailand’s real estate and hospitality sectors.

== Career ==
Watanasoponwong participated in the Missouri Photo Workshop in 2013, where he documented daily life in Trenton, Missouri.

In 2021 he was mentioned in a National Geographic article about Bangkok's developing creative community. Later that year he held the solo exhibition Saving Face at River City Bangkok, which the Bangkok Post discussed in articles on contemporary photography in Thailand.

In March 2024 he founded The Charoen AArt, a gallery in Bangkok located in a building formerly used by his family. Its early exhibitions included Dawn of Prosperity: Cultural Renaissance, reported by the Bangkok Post; a 2024 feature exhibition exploring themes of identity and contemporary culture; and Illya Skubak’s STRATUM (2025), involving engraved basalt and installation works.

In October 2025, Watanasoponwong presented the exhibition IMPERMANENCE at The Charoen AArt. Coverage by Time Out Bangkok and The Thaiger described the exhibition’s use of light, slide film and kaleidoscopic lenses.

Further analysis of the exhibition appeared in the Bangkok Post, which described IMPERMANENCE as a reflection on fragility, memory and the value of the present moment.

In July 2025 he served as a guest curator for the Experimental Photo Festival in Barcelona. His gallery practice was also discussed in an interview with Artsy earlier that year.

== Artistic practice ==
Watanasoponwong works with analogue and digital photography, often combining street photography, multiple exposures, re-photographed prints, film-soup processes and cross-processed slide film. He also uses kaleidoscope lenses and controlled lighting to create abstraction. His work has been profiled by publications such as Creative Boom, Life Framer, and L’Œil de la Photographie. He has also produced exhibition catalogues and installation-based works.
