= Andrew McCormick =

Andrew McCormick may refer to:

- Andrew McCormick (rugby union), New Zealand born Japanese rugby union player
- Andrew Phelps McCormick (1832–1916), United States federal judge
- A. T. McCormick (1761–1841), Episcopal clergyman and Chaplain of the United States Senate

== See also ==
- Andrew McCormack (born 1978), New York-based British jazz pianist
- Andrew MacCormac (1826–1918), portrait painter in South Australia
