= Jodi Cobb =

American photographer

Jodi Cobb is an American photographer, living in Washington, D.C. She was named White House Photographer of the Year in 1985, and has received awards from Pictures of the Year International, World Press Photo and the National Press Photographers Association.

== Education ==
Cobb received a Master of Arts and Bachelor of Journalism degrees from the University of Missouri, and an honorary Doctor of Fine Arts from the Corcoran College of Art and Design.

== Life and work ==
She was the only woman on staff photographer in National Geographic history and has been featured in over 30 National Geographic stories. Her work has brought her to over 60 countries, including China, where she was one of the first photographers to travel across the country.

== Publications ==
=== Books of work by Cobb ===
- Geisha: the Life, the Voices, the Art. New York: Knopf, 1995. ISBN 9780375701801. With an introduction by Ian Buruma.
  - Revised edition, 1998

=== Books with contributions by Cobb ===
- The Wall: Images and Offerings from the Vietnam Veterans Memorial. San Francisco: Collins Pub, 1987. ISBN 978-0002179744.
- The Way Home: Ending Homelessness in America. By Nan Roman. New York: Harry N. Abrams, 1999. ISBN 978-0810945531.
- 20th Century Photographers: Interviews on the Craft, Purpose, and the Passion of Photography. Abingdon-on-Thames, UK: Routledge, 2014. By Grace Schaub. ISBN 9781138840959.

== Awards ==
- 1985: White House Photographer of the Year
- 1986: 3rd prize, Daily Life, Stories category, World Press Photo, Amsterdam
- 2004: First Place, Magazine Division / General News Reporting, Pictures of the Year International
- 2012: Missouri Honor Medal for Distinguished Service in Journalism, Missouri School of Journalism, University of Missouri, Columbia, MO

Geisha: the Life, the Voices, the Art was nominated for the Pulitzer Prize and was a winner of the Outstanding Achievement Award from the American Society of Media Photographers.
