= Peter Turnley =

American and French photographer (born 1955)

Peter N. Turnley
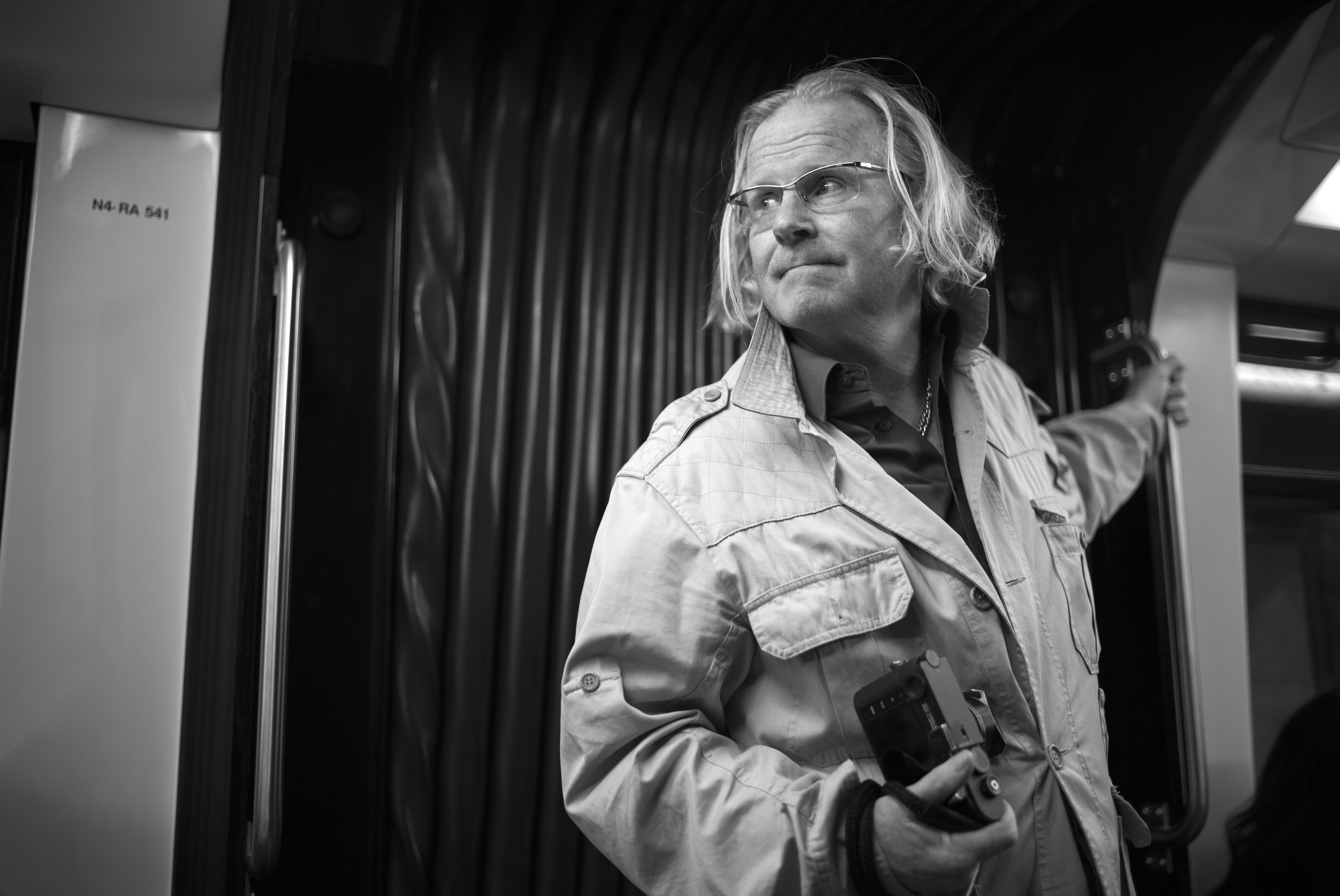
- Peter Turnley, Paris, 2019.
- Born: June 22, 1955
- Education: University of Michigan
- Occupation: Photographer

Peter N. Turnley (born June 22, 1955) is an American and French photographer known for documenting the human condition and current events. He is also a street photographer who has lived in and photographed Paris since 1978.

Turnley's photographs have been used on the cover of Newsweek more than forty times. He and his twin brother, the photographer David C. Turnley, were the subjects of a biographical 60 Minutes piece Double Exposure, which aired during their exhibition, In Times of War and Peace at New York's International Center of Photography in 1996.

== Education ==
Turnley is a graduate of the University of Michigan, the Sorbonne of Paris, and the Institut d'études politiques of Paris, one of the few American students ever to do so. He has received honorary doctorates from the New School of Social Research in New York and University of St Francis (Indiana) and Ohio Wesleyan University. Harvard University awarded him a Nieman Fellowship for 2000–2001.

== Photography ==
Turnley first began photographing in 1972 in his hometown of Fort Wayne, Indiana. With his twin brother David, he spent a year photographing the life of the inner-city, working-class McClellan Street. This work was published in 2008 by Indiana University Press. In 1975, the Office of Economic Opportunity of the State of California hired Turnley to produce a photographic documentary on poverty in California.

After an initial sojourn of eight months in Paris in 1975 to 1976, Turnley moved there in 1978. He began working as a printer at the photography lab, Picto. At the same time, he began photographing street scenes in Paris, which resulted in the book Parisians (2001). He began working as the assistant to the photographer Robert Doisneau in 1981 and with Doisneau's introduction to Raymond Grosset, the director of the Rapho photo agency, Turnley became a member of Rapho, working alongside many of the photographers of the French school of humanist photography. He became associated with the Black Star photo agency and was mentored by its director Howard Chapnick. As Paris-based contract photographer for Newsweek from 1984 to 2001, Turnley's photographs appeared on its cover 43 times. In 2003, he began producing eight-page quarterly photo-essays for Harper's Magazine.

Turnley has photographed world conflicts including the Gulf War, Bosnian War, Somali Civil War, Rwandan genocide, South Africa under apartheid, First Chechen War, Operation Uphold Democracy in Haiti, Tiananmen Square protests of 1989, the Israeli–Palestinian conflict, Afghanistan, Kosovo War, and Iraq (2003). During the end of the Cold War (1985–1991) Turnley photographed Soviet leader Mikhail Gorbachev more than any other Western journalist. He witnessed the fall of the Berlin Wall and the revolutions in Eastern Europe in 1989, Nelson Mandela's walk out of prison after 27 years incarceration, and the ensuing end of apartheid in South Africa. Turnley was also present in New York City at "Ground Zero" on September 11, 2001, and in New Orleans during the aftermath of Hurricane Katrina. He photographed the election and inauguration of President Barack Obama and produced a multimedia piece on this occasion for CNN.

In 2015, Turnley was the first American artist since the Cuban revolution to be given a major exposition at the Museo de Bellas Artes in Havana.

In 2020, Turnley created a visual diary in New York City and Paris, France, which resulted in a book "A New York-Paris Visual Diary: The Human Face of Covid-19. A selection of this work was a headline exhibition at the International Photojournalism Festival Visa Pour L'Image in Perpignan, France in 2020.

== Teaching and workshops ==
During the fall of 2001 Turnley was a Teaching Fellow for Professor Robert Coles for his class "The Literature of Social Reflection" at Harvard, and he is a frequent lecturer and teacher at universities and on panels worldwide, including the Danish National School of Journalism, Parsons School of Design, Paris, the University of Hanover, Germany, The University of Michigan, The University of Iowa, and Indiana University. He was an artist-in-residence at the Residential College of the University of Michigan during the spring semester of 2008.

He teaches workshops on street photography and the photo-essay in Paris, New York City, and Venice.

== Publications ==
- 1989: Beijing Spring. Stuart, Tabori & Chang, New York.
- 1990: Moments of Revolution. Stuart, Tabori & Chang, New York.
- 1996: In Times of War and Peace. Abbeville Press, New York.
- 2000: Parisians. Abbeville Press, New York.
- 2007: McClellan Street. Indiana University Press, Bloomington.
- 2013: French Kiss - A Love Letter to Paris
- 2015: Cuba – A Grace of Spirit.
- 2020: A New York-Paris Visual Diary: The Human Face of Covid-19

== Exhibitions ==
- The Content of Our Character, Weatherhead Gallery, University of St Francis, Fort Wayne, Indiana, 2009
- Momentos de la Condición Humana, Museo Nacional de Bellas Artes de La Habana, La Habana, Cuba, 2015

== Awards ==
- Overseas Press Club Award for Best Photographic Reporting from Abroad
- Prix Visa d'Or News Nominated - Visa pour l'Image Festival 2020, Perpignan, France
