= MaryAnne Golon =

American journalist

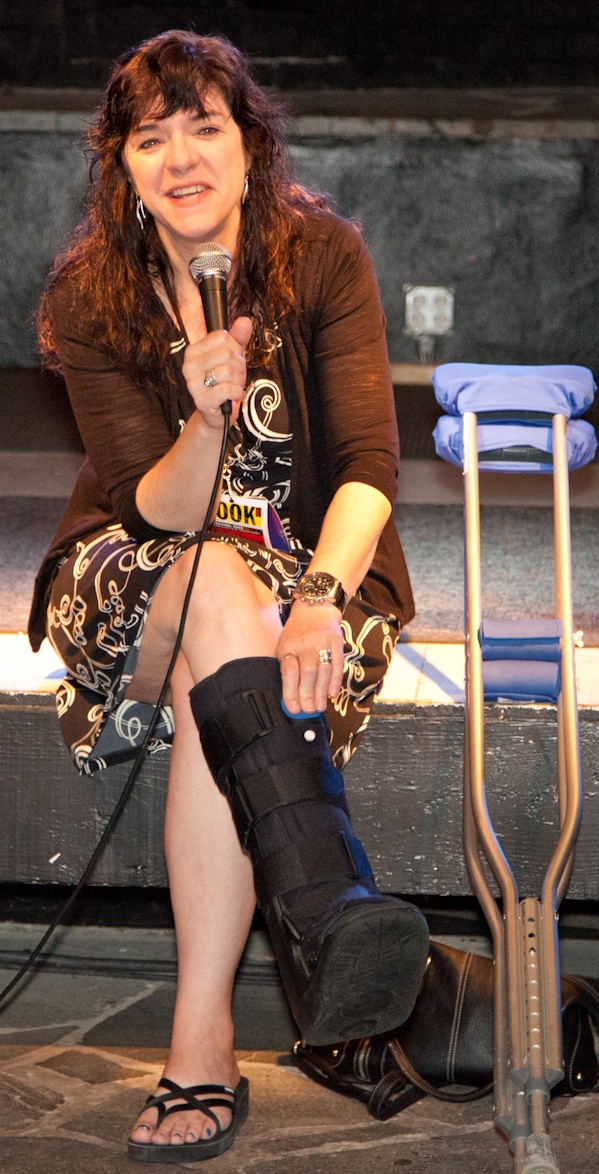
MaryAnne Golon at the 2011 Look 3 photography conference

MaryAnne Golon (born December 2, 1960) is Assistant Managing Editor and Director of Photography at The Washington Post.

== Biography ==
She received a Bachelor of Science degree in journalism from the University of Florida and is a distinguished alumnus. She completed a fellowship in Public Policy Studies at Duke University in 1991.

Golon was Time Magazine's director of photography until June 30, 2008. She managed the photography department of the newsweekly along with Michele Stephenson for over twenty years. Among her professional contributions to Time, Golon led the photography team that produced the Hurricane Katrina special edition and the September 11, 2001 special black-bordered edition, each winning National Magazine Awards for single issue topics. Golon has received numerous individual picture-editing awards from Pictures of the Year International and the National Press Photographers Association Best of Photography competitions.

Golon was the on-site photography editor in Dhahran for Time magazine during the Gulf War. She was directly involved in the production of scores of award-winning Time covers and special editions. She coordinated Time's photographic coverage of the Olympic Games for sixteen years.

== Projects and honors ==
- Chair of Professional Advisory Board, NOOR photo agency, Amsterdam, the Netherlands 2009-2011
- Guest Director, LOOK 3, Festival of the Photograph, Charlottesville, Virginia, June 10–13, 2009
- Jury Chair, World Press Photo foundation, Amsterdam, the Netherlands, 2009
- Jury, World Press Photo foundation, Amsterdam, the Netherlands, 2008
- Jury, CHIPP, premier edition of China International Press Photo Contest, Shenzhen, China 2005, 2012
- Faculty, Joop Swart Masterclass, World Press Photo foundation, The Netherlands 2002-2005
- Jury, Visa Pour L'Image, Perpignan, France 1996–1999, 2004, 2006, 2008–2009, 2012
- Faculty, Missouri Photo Workshop, 1999–2000, 2002–2008, 2012, 2014-18
- Faculty and member of Board of Directors, Eddie Adams Workshop, 1997–2000, 2008–2017
- Faculty, Summit Photographic Workshop, 1998, 2000, 2002, 2006–2009, 2012, 2015, 2018
- Jury, Pictures of the Year International competition, 1997, 1998, 2001
