= Rick Shaw =

Rick Shaw may refer to:

- Rick Shaw (journalist) (born 1956), American journalism academic and journalist
- Rick Shaw (radio) (1938–2017), American disc jockey, radio and television personality
- Rick Shaw (Canadian football) (1946–2025), American football player in Canada

== See also ==
- Rickshaw, a pedestrian-powered vehicle for carrying one or two passengers
- Ricky Shaw (born 1965), American football player
- Richard Shaw (disambiguation)
