= Lewis Shaw Coleman House =

Historic house in Missouri, United States

- U.S. National Register of Historic Places
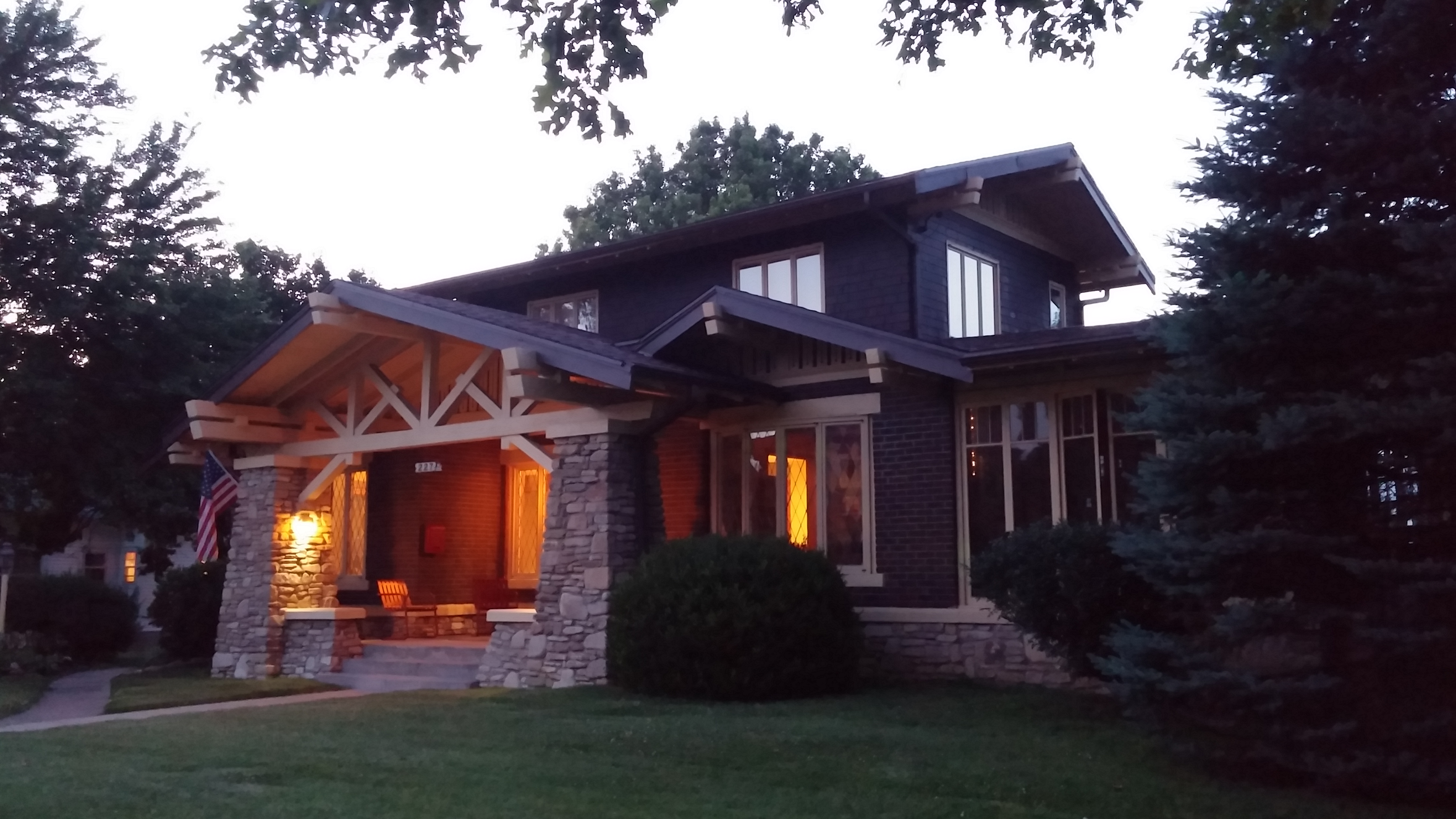

- Location within Missouri Location within the United States
- Location: 227 E. College Street, Aurora, Missouri
- Coordinates: 36°58′18″N 93°43′02″W
- Area: less than one acre
- Built: 1914, c. 1927, c. 1955
- Architectural style: Bungalow/Craftsman
- NRHP reference No.: 16000727
- Added to NRHP: October 17, 2016

The Lewis Shaw Coleman House is a historic house located at 227 East College Street in Aurora, Lawrence County, Missouri.

== Description ==
The Lewis Shaw Coleman House, built in 1914, is the first private residence in Lawrence County to be placed on the National Register of Historic Places. It was added to the register in 2016 for its architectural significance.

The two-story, U-shaped American Craftsman style "airplane" bungalow sits on a limestone rubble foundation and the first floor walls are brick. It features exposed rafters in open eaves, low-pitched gable roofs with wide overhangs, decorative gable beams, and a prominent front porch with tapered stone columns. Also on the property are the contributing carriage house (c. 1927) and garage (c. 1955).

== Owners ==
Lewis Shaw Coleman and his wife Mary Kate Miller Coleman, children of two prominent Lawrence County families, built the Coleman House in 1914 on a corner lot overlooking Oak Park in Aurora.

Established in 1870, Aurora saw sudden population growth due in large part to a mining boom in 1885 which spiked the population over 3,400 by 1890. Aurora's population peaked in 1900 at 6,191 a gain of more than 77%. As the mining industry faded by 1910, the population had fallen 33% to 4,148. However Aurora's business infrastructure remained strong with three banks, three flour mills, a shoe factory, a daily and weekly newspaper, and three lumber yards including the M.L. Coleman Lumber Company and the T.A. Miller Lumber Company.

McCord Lafayette (M.L.) Coleman, born 1859, was one of the business giants of Aurora operating six lumber yards in the region as well as a hardware and implement business. He founded the largest milling company in the county and served as president of a local bank. He was successful in mining, owned a 120-acre apple orchard, and a large herd of Jersey milk cows. Lewis Shaw Coleman was his only son.

Thomas Alexander (T.A.) Miller, born 1858, was another Aurora business giant. "In 1897, Mr. Miller returned to the lumber business in Aurora, to which he had moved in 1892. He expanded until he owned ten yards and several sawmills in Arkansas. He built a brick block in Greenfield while a resident there, the first brick building in Miller, a town which bears his name, the courthouse at Mount Vernon and the Franklin school here." In 1915, Mr. Miller would be elected mayor of Aurora. Mary Kate Miller was his eldest daughter.

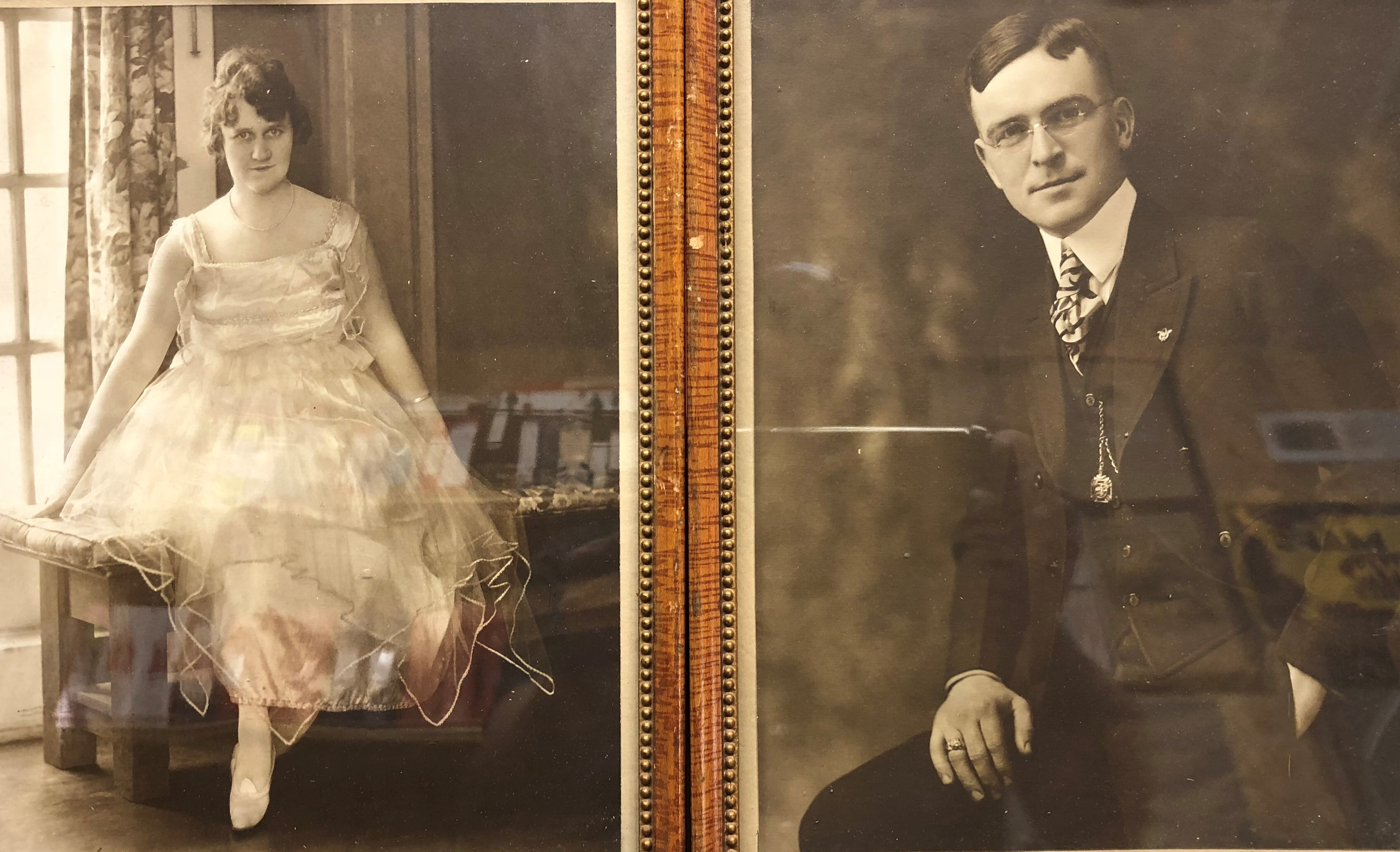
Mary Kate Miller Coleman, Lewis Shaw Coleman

In 1914, Lewis Shaw Coleman and Mary Kate Miller, a high-profile couple in the community, were married with two young sons. They were well positioned to build a remarkable home when a prime building lot unexpectedly became available within three blocks of the center of Aurora. A grand Victorian home built in 1906 by Mrs. Jeanette Seburn on a prominent lot at the northwest corner of Park and College Streets had burned to the ground. Lewis Shaw Coleman purchased the newly vacant building site in 1913 planning "to have a fine residence erected."

As construction neared completion in 1914, The Aurora Advertiser pronounced the significance of the Coleman bungalow writing "Louis (sic) Coleman is completing a beautiful bungalow on East College", adding that such homes "...show the progressive spirit of the city. Builders here see the beautiful possibilities in these creations in the architectural lines." Contemporary accounts of the construction did not note the architect of the Coleman House and the architect currently remains unknown.

Fortune did not smile on the young Coleman family and in 1916, their youngest son Lewis Shaw Coleman Jr died at the age of five and in 1918, Mary Kate died at the age of 32, just six days after Lewis registered for the World War I draft. In February 1929, Lewis and his second wife Irene Madry Coleman signed a Promissory Note to the Bank of Aurora with their home as collateral. Following the stock market crash in October 1929, O.E. and Linda Moore purchased the Coleman House at a sheriff's auction on the Lawrence County courthouse steps for $2,500 in October 1930.

The grandson of Ossye Coleman, the sister of Lewis Shaw Coleman, is Don S. Davis, an actor born and raised in Aurora, MO best known for his role in the television series Stargate SG-1.

The Moore family, the second owners of the Coleman House, went on to be the longest inhabitants - raising their family and living at the same address for more than 50 years. "O.E. Moore came to Aurora in 1926 and purchased the Summit City Creamery located in a small building in the west part of the present plant. It grew into a large butter plant, later shifting to the manufacture of cheese, with trucks fanning out for miles picking up milk at the farms. Mr. Moore was for many years president of the Aurora board of education."

Following the Colemans and the Moores, three other families have owned the home: Bill and Terry Duncan, Wayne and Mary Lou Holmes, Kelly and Mary Jo Johnston. All of these families cared for the architectural treasure envisioned by Lewis and Mary Kate.

== Architecture ==
In contrast to the Victorian homes occupying the 200 block of East College Street, the young Colemans, still in their 20s, opted for the American Craftsman style incorporating originality, a visible sturdy structure of clean lines, prominence of handicraft, and local natural materials.

The Coleman house is built with definitive Craftsman features including exposed rafters in open eaves, low-pitched gable roofs with wide overhangs, decorative gable beams, large windows to connect the house with nature, and a prominent front porch with tapered stone columns matching the battered stone foundation. Matching stonework is found both in the tapered limestone piers supporting the oversized open-timbered end-gabled front porch and in two full-height limestone chimney stacks at the rear of the home. The second floor ‘airplane’ level covers a smaller footprint than the main level below and is clad in wood shake shingles. It is a significant example of Craftsman Airplane Bungalow architecture in the Southwest Missouri Ozarks.

== National Register of Historic Places ==
The Coleman House joins four NRHP listings in Lawrence County: the Lawrence County Courthouse (Missouri) in Mount Vernon, the Pierce City Fire Station, Courthouse and Jail, the Lawrence County Bank Building in Pierce City, Missouri and the Old Spanish Fort Archeological Site near Mount Vernon. The Coleman House is the only residential property listed in the county. And it is interesting to note that the T.A. Miller family was responsible for two of the four county buildings: T.A. Miller was awarded the construction contract for the Lawrence County Courthouse in 1900; and his daughter Mary Kate Miller, along with her husband Lewis, built the Coleman House fourteen years later.

Inclusion on the NRHP, the official list of historic places worthy of preservation in the United States, recognizes the architectural significance of the Coleman House and helps to raise awareness of the importance of historic preservation in Southwest Missouri. It does not place restrictions or limitations on the use, transfer, or maintenance of the property.
