= David C. Turnley =

American photographer (born 1955)

David Carl Turnley
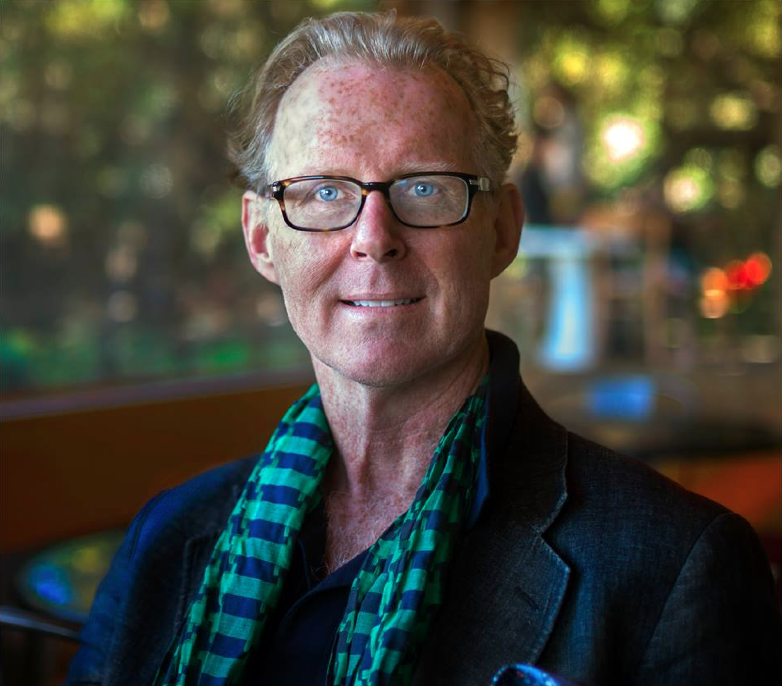
- Born: June 22, 1955 (age 71); Fort Wayne, Indiana, United States
- Education: University of Michigan; Sorbonne; Harvard University
- Occupation: Photographer
- Spouse: Rachel Turnley
- Children: 2
- Parents: William Loyd Turnley (father); Elizabeth Ann Protsman (mother)
- Relatives: Peter Turnley (twin brother)

David Carl Turnley (born June 22, 1955) is an American and French photographer, winner of the Pulitzer Prize, two World Press Photos of the Year, and the Robert Capa Award for Courage.

His twin brother Peter Turnley is also a photographer.

== Life and career ==
David and Peter Turnley were born June 22, 1955, born to William Loyd Turnley and Elizabeth Ann Turnley (née Protsman) in Fort Wayne, Indiana. David Turnley studied French literature at the University of Michigan, where he earned a B.A. in 1977. A fluent speaker of French and Spanish, he also has studied at the Sorbonne and Harvard University.

Turnley won the 1990 Pulitzer Prize for photography for images of the political uprisings in China and Eastern Europe, the World Press Photo Picture of the Year in 1988 for a photo taken in Leninakan after the devastating Spitak earthquake and again in 1991 for a picture of a U.S. Sergeant mourning the death of a fellow soldier during the Gulf War, as well as the Overseas Press Club Robert Capa Gold Medal. He has been a runner-up for the Pulitzer Prize in photography four times.

From 1985 to 1997, Turnley covered the struggle to end Apartheid, revolutions in Eastern Europe, the student uprising in China, the Bosnian War and the Gulf War, and the fall of the Soviet Union. In addition to publishing numerous books, he has directed an Emmy-nominated documentary for CNN on the Dalai Lama, and a feature-length documentary set in Cuban dance hall, La Tropical. He directed the documentary Shenandoah, released in 2012, about the 2008 murder and attempted cover up of an immigrant from Mexico by a group of local high school football stars from Shenandoah, Pennsylvania.

Turnley was one of the few photographers who were at the World Trade Center in New York City on September 11, 2001, and who went into the rubble with the very first firemen.

Turnley is father of two children and lives with his wife Rachel in Paris, France.

== Books ==
- David Turnley: « Paris Amour. » Self-Published: David Turnley Photography, LLC, 2025. ISBN 979-8-218-66329-2.
- Jim Harbaugh, David Turnley: "Rise Again." Self-Published: Enthusiasm Productions LLC, 2017.
- Jim Harbaugh, David Turnley: "Enthusiasm Unknown to Mankind." Foster Park Publishing, 2016.
- David C. Turnley: Why Are They Weeping: South Africans Under Apartheid. Stewart, Tabori & Chang Inc, 1988, ISBN 978-1556700446
- David Turnley, Peter Turnley, Melinda Liu: Beijing Spring. Stewart, Tabori & Chang Inc, 1989, ISBN 978-1556701306
- David Turnley, Peter Turnley: Moments of Revolution: Eastern Europe. Stewart, Tabori & Chang Inc, 1990, ISBN 978-1556701689
- David C. Turnley, William Keller: The Russian Heart: Days of Crisis and Hope. Phaidon Press Ltd, 1992, ISBN 978-0714828411
- Howard Chapnick, David C. Turnley, Peter Turnley: In Times of War and Peace. Abbeville Press, 1997, ISBN 978-0789202994
- David Turnley: Baghdad Blues: A War Diary. Vendome Press, 2003, ISBN 978-0865652354
- John G. Morris, David Turnley, Peter Turnley: McClellan Street. Indiana Univ Press, 2007, ISBN 978-0253349675
- David Turnley: Mandela!: Struggle & Triumph. Harry N. Abrams, 2008, ISBN 978-0810970922
