= Clifton C. Edom =

Cliff Edom
- Born: Clifton Cedric Edom; February 12, 1907; Baylis, Illinois, U.S.
- Died: January 30, 1991 (aged 83); Branson, Missouri, U.S.
- Education: University of Missouri (1946)
- Known for: "Father of Photojournalism"
- Awards: NPPA's Joseph A. Sprague Award, 1955
- Scientific career
- Fields: Photojournalism
- Workplaces: University of Missouri, 1943-1972

Clifton Cedric Edom (February 12, 1907 – January 30, 1991), often credited with the title "Father of Photojournalism", was prolific in the development of photojournalism education.

== Biography ==
Edom was born in Baylis, Illinois. After receiving a teaching certificate from the Western Illinois State Teachers College, now Western Illinois University, in 1925, he attended a Linotype school and worked for several newspapers. He married Vilia Clarissa "Vi" Patefield (1908–2004) on June 30, 1928, and the couple bought the weekly Edgar News in Edgar, Wisconsin, working with it until 1930 when Edom began work with the Wausau Record-Herald in Wausau, Wisconsin.

Five years later, the Edoms with their daughter Verna Mae "Vme", moved to Aurora, Missouri, for Cliff to study under renowned photographer Charles S. Martz at Tasopé and he went on to serve as educational director of TASOPE, the Aurora School of Photo-Engraving, as well as editor of its magazine The Tasope News, later PIX.

In 1943, Frank Luther Mott, dean of the School of Journalism at the University of Missouri at Columbia, recruited Edom to head the new photojournalism sequence. He also enrolled as an undergraduate; teaching classes he wasn't able to take until his junior year, and finally completed his Bachelor of Journalism in 1946.

Edom was prolific in his advancement of photojournalism as a recognized field, including the founding of Kappa Alpha Mu, the National Photojournalism Honors Society on April 20, 1945, and editing with Vi Edom the society's official publication, The National Photojournalist. He also established the News Pictures of the Year Competition and Exhibition, now Pictures of the Year International (POYi), in 1944, incorporating the College Photographer of the Year competition the next year.

In 1949, the Edoms founded the first Missouri Photo Workshop to teach methods of research, observation, and timing in developing photostories of rural Missouri towns. Roy Stryker, Russell Lee, Angus McDougall, among many other of America's leading newspaper and magazine photographers and editors, have served as faculty at the workshop. According to the Missouri Photo Workshop, Edom's credo was to "Show truth with a camera. Ideally truth is a matter of personal integrity. In no circumstances will a posed or fake photograph be tolerated."

In 1955, Edom received the Joseph A. Sprague Memorial Award from the National Press Photographers Association, which is "the highest honor in the field of photojournalism."

Although he continued his involvement with the school, Edom retired from the University of Missouri in 1972. He and Vi established The Little Gallery in Forsyth, Missouri, and Edom continued teaching at Crowder College in Neosho, Missouri. He died in Branson, Missouri.

== Legacy ==
In 1991, the National Press Photographers Association established the Clifton C. Edom Award, which "recognizes an individual in the tradition of Cliff Edom to inspire and motivate members of the photojournalism community to reach new heights."

Vme Edom Smith founded the Cliff and Vi Edom Truth with a Camera Workshop, which is sponsored in part by the Clifton C. and Vilia C. Edom Foundation for Photojournalism Education.

== Bibliography ==
- Halftone and Line Negatives with Your Photo-Enlarger: A Manual. Columbia, MO: Columbia Printing Co., 1951.
- With Stanley Kalish. Picture Editing. New York: Rhinehart & Co., 1951.
- Missouri Sketch Book: a Collection of Words and Pictures of the Civil War. Columbia, MO: Lucas Bros., 1963.
- Photojournalism: Principles and Practices. Dubuque, Iowa: W. C. Brown Co., 1976. ISBN 0-697-04303-7
- With Vi Edom. Twice Told Tales and an Ozark Photo Album, with Emphasis on Taney County, Missouri. Republic, MO.: Western Printing Co., 1983.
- With Vi Edom and Verna Mae Edom Smith. Small Town America: the Missouri Photo Workshops, 1949-1991. Golden, CO: Fulcrum Pub., 1993. ISBN 1-55591-167-6
