= Lisa Larsen =

German-American photojournalist (1922–1959)

Lisa Larsen (1922–1959) was a pioneering American woman photojournalist.

== Biography ==
Born in Pforzheim in Germany, Lisa Rothschild sailed on 28th October 1939 on board the S.S. Veendam from Antwerp to the United States as a teenager where she graduated early from college at just 17.

== Early career ==
Employed at the photography agency Black Star, as an office worker, she was apprenticed by Vogue, then freelanced for several years through Graphics House agency. Her assignments came from the New York Times Magazine, Parade, Glamour, Vogue, Charm and Holiday.

== Life magazine ==
After 1948, the bulk of Larsen’s photojournalism was contract work for LIFE on which she served on staff from 1949 to 1959. Initially she was assigned mainly entertainment, celebrity and fashion stories, including the Vanderbilts, Kennedys, Bing Crosby, and the Duke of Windsor. However she picked up political stories; a Brooklyn police inquiry, the official post-election portrait of First Lady Bess Truman and her daughter Margaret; the Dwight D. Eisenhower presidential campaign in 1950; the John F. Kennedy-Jacqueline Bouvier wedding in 1953; campaigning by Vice President Alben Barkley (who referred to Larsen as “Mona Lisa,”); and the McCarthy rally of November 29, 1954, in Madison Square Garden, at which the crowd booed at the mention of The New York Times, and when Larsen entered, who was by then well-known, a near-riot erupted and while police escorted her from the hall, a voice shouted 'Hang the Communist bitch!'

== International correspondent ==
Fluent in French, English, German and speaking some Danish and Russian, Larsen was assigned international stories from the early 1950s; Iran’s Premier Mohammed Mossadegh from his New York hospital bed, where she photographed him during the 1951 Iranian oil dispute with Great Britain, invited her to visit Iran for a two weeks in 1952 to photograph in Isfahan, Qom, Persepolis, and Shiraz; photographing Vijaya Lakshmi Pandit, the first female president of the United Nations General Assembly (1953); Queen Elizabeth II’s first royal tour; and the Institute of Nutrition of Central America and Panama in 1954, where she talked to doctors, inspected labs, and went into the field to cover the assignment. A photograph from the latter assignment was selected by Edward Steichen for the 1955 world-touring Museum of Modern Art exhibition The Family of Man that was seen by 9 million visitors. It shows a broadly smiling young Guatemalan mother with a baby on her back in a sling, into which two little girls peer with evident delight. The tropical setting is apparent from the palm fronds in the background and the image is full of human warmth.

At the 1955 Bandung Conference promoting ties between Africa and Asia in Indonesia which Larson covered with Howard Sochurek, she used a small portable tape recorder and two Leica cameras, and was often mentioned in the local press as an object of popular admiration. She then traveled through Hong Kong, Japan, Vietnam, Cambodia, Laos, and China, spending four months in Moscow in 1956, where she attracted the admiration of Nikita Khrushchev.

== Portraits ==
Larsen was noted by Life magazine editors for her capacity to gain the trust of portrait subjects. The first nationally-distributed photograph of Truman Capote was published in LIFE Visits Yaddo, a photo-essay by Larsen in the July 15, 1946 issue which includes a double portrait of Capote sitting at the feet of Marguerite Young. Larson was the only photographic correspondent permitted to photograph Yugoslavian leader Marshall Josip Tito at the Black Sea resort of Sochi, Russia during his visit to the Soviet Union, and the first American photographer permitted to visit Outer Mongolia in over ten years in the summer of 1956, through invitation of the Mongolian ambassador whom she met in Moscow. LIFE, July 22, 1957, 56–65, published many of her photographs taken in Mongolia by Lisa Larsen, who accompanied The New York Times' Jack Raymond. In 1957 she reported on the social aftermath of the Polish Revolution and its effects on politics, industry, culture, and religion, and on displaced Hungarian refugees at camps in Yugoslavia, Germany, Switzerland, and Austria. Photo-editor-in-chief, Władysław Sławny of the Polish illustrated weekly newspaper Świat ('The World', 1951–1969), determined to keep pace with Western counterparts Life, Paris Match and Picture Post during the Cold War so published pictures by Larsen, Magnum photographers and her other Western colleagues. After covering Khrushchev again in 1958, on the anniversary of the 1945 “Liberation by the Red Army”, the American National Press Photographers Association awarded her 'Magazine Photographer of the Year' in 1958, the first female photographer to receive it, and the last for another forty years. Her works from Poland and Mongolia were presented that year in a solo exhibition at the Overseas Press Club in New York.

She said;

I feel it is very important to know your subjects as individuals. Ideally this takes time–and often you don’t have time. You work under pressure. . . . I dislike superficial and I especially dislike superficial relationships.”

== Tributes ==
Larsen was treated for breast cancer in 1957, was well enough to accept her Overseas Press Club Award the following year, and continued her assignments in Poland, but died in 1959 after developing tumours in her neck. LIFE remembered her in their March 23 editorial;

Lisa Larsen liked people. And because, while being thoroughly professional, she was a very attractive person the people she photographed came to like her too.... In Russia in 1956, Khrushchev developed such admiration for her and her indefatigable work habits that he gave her a bouquet of peonies. Later she inspired an aside from Khrushchev during one of his cocky anti-Western speeches. "Don't misunderstand me, " he said, eyeing her in the audience. "There is an American girl standing in front of me. Americans are good people.” Last week Lisa Larsen died. In 10 years with LIFE she had made a brilliant name for herself and won a shelf full of photographic awards…Her colleagues on LIFE — photographers, reporters, writers, editors — share the never-flagging interest she had in people. They will try to fill the gap, but they will sadly miss her vivacity and warmth.

== Exhibitions ==
- 1950 Color Photography, May 9 – July 4, 1950, The Museum of Modern Art
- 1950 Photographs by 51 Photographers, August 1 – September 17, 1950 The Museum of Modern Art
- 1951 Memorable Life Photographs, November 20 – December 12, 1951 The Museum of Modern Art
- 1955 The Family of Man January 24 – May 8, 1955 The Museum of Modern Art
- 1957 Photographs by Lisa Larsen, Jan 15 – Mar 30, 1957, Art Institute of Chicago
- 1958 Photographs by Larsen from Poland and Mongolia, Overseas Press Club, New York.
- 1958 70 Photographers Look at New York November 27, 1957 – April 15, 1958 The Museum of Modern Art
- 1964 Art in a Changing World: 1884–1964: Edward Steichen Photography Center May 27, 1964 The Museum of Modern Art
- 2017 UNGARN 56: Bilder einer Revolution, 20 Oct 2016 – 29 Jan 2017 Westlicht, Austria
- 2011 American way of LIFE, 2 Nov – 24 Dec 2011, Galerie Stephen Hoffman, Germany
- 2005 Woman of LIFE, 7 Jul – 12 Aug 2005, Alan Klotz Gallery, USA
- 2018 University of Michigan Museum of Art: LIFE Magazine 1947 Homecoming Photographs, August 25 – November 18, 2018

== Awards ==
- 1953 Magazine Photographer of the Year
- 1958 Overseas Press Club award
