= Aurora, Missouri =

- City
- Location of Aurora, Missouri
- Coordinates: 36°58′12″N 93°43′14″W
- Country: United States
- State: Missouri
- County: Lawrence
- Founded: 1870
- Incorporated: 1885

Government
  - Type: Council - Manager

Area
  - Total: 6.33 sq mi (16.39 km^{2})
  - Land: 6.30 sq mi (16.31 km^{2})
  - Water: 0.031 sq mi (0.08 km^{2})
- Elevation: 1,401 ft (427 m)

Population (2020)
  - Total: 7,219
  - Estimate (2024): 7,573
  - Density: 1,146.4/sq mi (442.64/km^{2})
- Time zone: UTC-6 (Central (CST))
  - Summer (DST): UTC-5 (CDT)
- ZIP code: 65605
- Area code: 417
- FIPS code: 29-02548
- GNIS feature ID: 0713486
- Website: aurora-cityhall.org

Aurora is a city in Lawrence County, Missouri, United States. As of the 2020 census, the population of the city was 7,217.

== History ==
The Honey Creek area, near Aurora, was originally settled by pioneers from Tennessee, including James D. Hillhouse, E. B. Hillhouse, Reverend A. A. Young, James Barrow and James Gibson. They were later instrumental in founding Aurora. Their descendants include actor Brad Pitt and novelist and national security analyst Raelynn Hillhouse.

Aurora was platted in 1870 by Stephen G. Elliott. It was reportedly named after Aurora, the Roman goddess of dawn.

Galena ore was discovered in 1885 while digging a well on the farm of Thomas D. Liles in November, marking the beginning of Aurora as a mining town. Mining of surface outcrops began in 1886. Large scale commercial mining began shortly afterwards as the mines grew deeper and zinc and galena were discovered. The zinc from the Aurora mines was of exceptional purity and high grade. By 1893, 12,651 tons of zinc ore were mined and shipped from Aurora. The mines attracted prospectors and miners. Aurora's population peaked at 10,000 circa 1900.

The Frisco Railroad (now Burlington Northern-Santa Fe) and the Missouri Pacific (now Missouri and Northern Arkansas Railroad) previously had depots in Aurora. The train master for the Missouri Pacific Railroad's White River division was headquartered in Aurora until the mid-1950s.

From 1911 to 1920, the virulently anti-Catholic newspaper The Menace was published in Aurora by W. F. Phelps and Earl McClure. In 1914, it achieved a national circulation of over one million, according to the March 1932 issue of American Mercury.

== Geography ==
Aurora is located at 36°58′12″N 93°43′14″W (36.969956, -93.720574). According to the United States Census Bureau, the city has a total area of 5.98 square miles (15.49 km^{2}), of which 5.95 square miles (15.41 km^{2}) is land and 0.03 square miles (0.08 km^{2}) is water.

== Demographics ==
Historical population
Census	Pop.	Note	%±
1890	3,482		—
1900	6,191		77.8%
1910	4,148		−33.0%
1920	3,575		−13.8%
1930	3,875		8.4%
1940	4,056		4.7%
1950	4,153		2.4%
1960	4,683		12.8%
1970	5,359		14.4%
1980	6,437		20.1%
1990	6,459		0.3%
2000	7,014		8.6%
2010	7,508		7.0%
2020	7,219		−3.8%
U.S. Decennial Census; 2013 Estimate

=== 2020 census ===
As of the 2020 census, Aurora had a population of 7,219. The median age was 39.2 years. 24.8% of residents were under the age of 18 and 18.4% of residents were 65 years of age or older. For every 100 females there were 95.4 males, and for every 100 females age 18 and over there were 90.7 males age 18 and over.

98.2% of residents lived in urban areas, while 1.8% lived in rural areas.

There were 2,914 households in Aurora, of which 30.0% had children under the age of 18 living in them. Of all households, 42.5% were married-couple households, 18.6% were households with a male householder and no spouse or partner present, and 30.2% were households with a female householder and no spouse or partner present. About 32.4% of all households were made up of individuals and 15.8% had someone living alone who was 65 years of age or older.

There were 3,349 housing units, of which 13.0% were vacant. The homeowner vacancy rate was 3.9% and the rental vacancy rate was 9.0%.

Racial composition as of the 2020 census
Race	Number	Percent
White	6,135	85.0%
Black or African American	35	0.5%
American Indian and Alaska Native	81	1.1%
Asian	13	0.2%
Native Hawaiian and Other Pacific Islander	3	0.0%
Some other race	383	5.3%
Two or more races	569	7.9%
Hispanic or Latino (of any race)	738	10.2%

=== 2010 census ===
As of the census of 2010, there were 7,508 people, 2,948 households, and 1,943 families living in the city. The population density was 1,261.8 inhabitants per square mile (487.2/km^{2}). There were 3,396 housing units at an average density of 570.8 units per square mile (220.4 units/km^{2}). The racial makeup of the city was 92.3% White, 0.3% African American, 0.9% Native American, 0.2% Asian, 0.1% Pacific Islander, 4.4% from other races, and 1.8% from two or more races. Hispanic or Latino of any race were 7.5% of the population.

There were 2,948 households, of which 36.1% had children under the age of 18 living with them, 46.8% were married couples living together, 14.0% had a female householder with no husband present, 5.1% had a male householder with no wife present, and 34.1% were non-families. 28.8% of all households were made up of individuals, and 13.2% had someone living alone who was 65 years of age or older. The average household size was 2.52 and the average family size was 3.09.

The median age in the city was 35.8 years. 27.6% of residents were under the age of 18; 8.2% were between the ages of 18 and 24; 25% were from 25 to 44; 23.4% were from 45 to 64; and 15.8% were 65 years of age or older. The gender makeup of the city was 47.2% male and 52.8% female.

=== 2000 census ===
As of the census of 2000, there were 7,014 people, 2,818 households, and 1,865 families living in the city. The population density was 1,278.7 inhabitants per square mile (493.7/km^{2}). There were 3,093 housing units at an average density of 563.9 units per square mile (217.7 units/km^{2}). The racial makeup of the city was 95.68% White, 0.26% African American, 0.83% Native American, 0.26% Asian, 1.34% from other races, and 1.64% from two or more races. Hispanic or Latino of any race were 2.71% of the population.

There were 2,818 households, out of which 33.2% had children under the age of 18 living with them, 50.9% were married couples living together, 11.2% had a female householder with no husband present, and 33.8% were non-families. 29.8% of all households were made up of individuals, and 16.0% had someone living alone who was 65 years of age or older. The average household size was 2.44 and the average family size was 3.02.

In the city the population was spread out, with 27.7% under the age of 18, 8.2% from 18 to 24, 26.4% from 25 to 44, 19.6% from 45 to 64, and 18.1% who were 65 years of age or older. The median age was 36 years. For every 100 females, there were 88.1 males. For every 100 females age 18 and over, there were 82.7 males.

The median income for a household in the city was $25,118, and the median income for a family was $33,029. Males had a median income of $27,591 versus $17,603 for females. The per capita income for the city was $13,410. About 14.4% of families and 18.2% of the population were below the poverty line, including 21.0% of those under age 18 and 15.6% of those age 65 or over.

== Transportation ==
The Jerry Sumners Sr. Aurora Municipal Airport is located two nautical miles (2.3 mi; 3.7 km) southeast of Aurora's central business district. US 60 passes about 2 miles (3.2 km) to the south and east of Aurora's business district, connecting the city with Springfield 30 miles (48 km) to the northeast, and Neosho 40 miles (64 km) to the southwest

== Education ==
Aurora R-VIII School District operates one early childhood school, one middle school, one Jr high school, and Aurora High School.

Aurora has a public library, a branch of the Barry-Lawrence Regional Library.

== Architecture ==
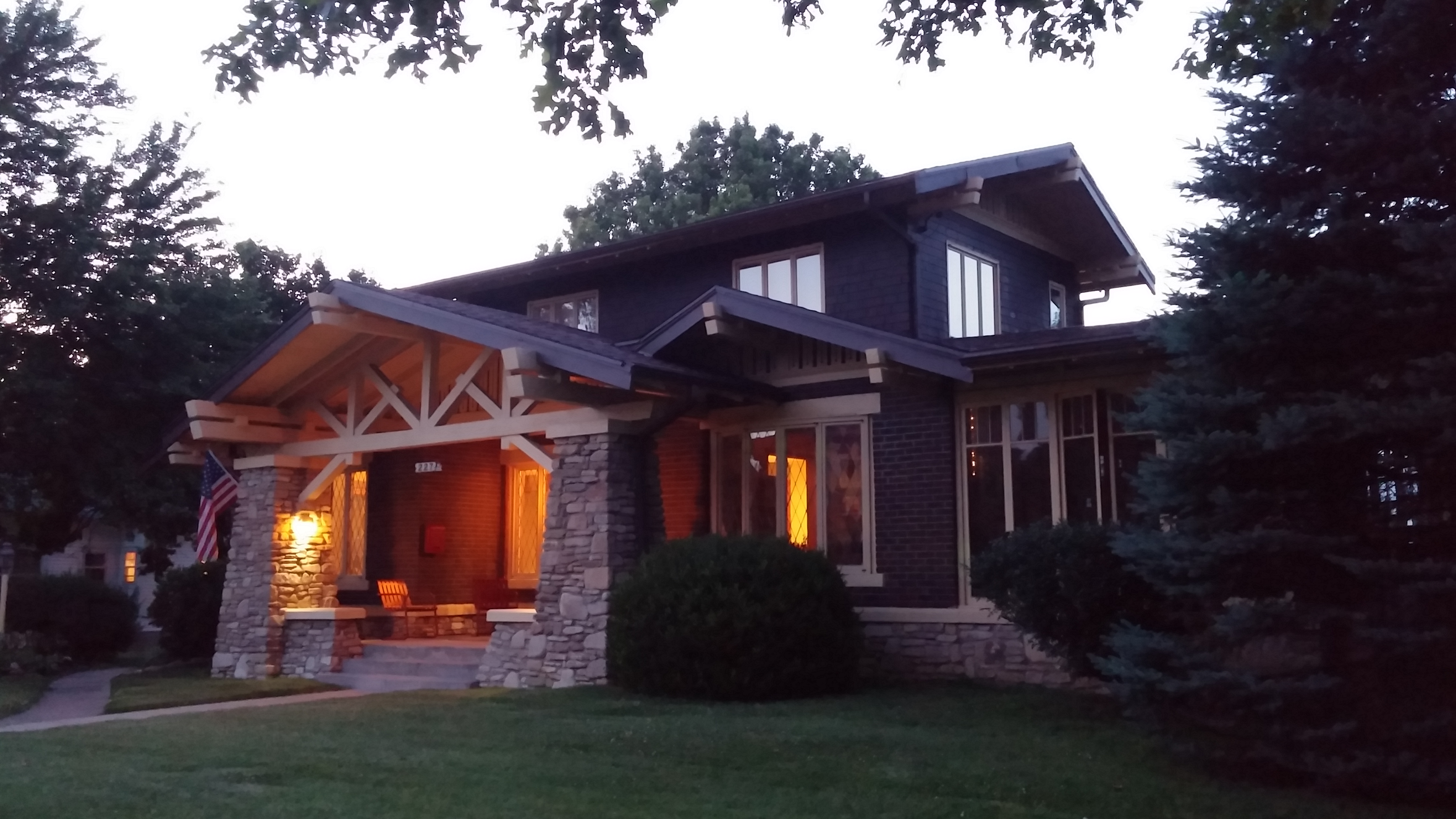
Lewis Shaw Coleman House, Aurora, Missouri, 2017

The Lewis Shaw Coleman House, an American Craftsman "airplane" bungalow built in 1914, was the first private residence in Lawrence County, Missouri, to be listed on the National Register of Historic Places.

== Media ==
The local newspaper is The Aurora Advertiser.

== Notable people ==
- Arthur "Doc" Barker, part of the Barker-Karpis gang; born in Aurora and died trying to escape from Alcatraz
- Fred Barker, founding member of the Barker-Karpis gang; born in Aurora and died in a gun fight with the FBI
- Don S. Davis, actor, best known for playing Major Garland Briggs on Twin Peaks and General George S. Hammond on Stargate SG-1
- Clifton C. Edom, Photojournalist, Professor, credited with the title "Father of Photojournalism"
- Raelynn Hillhouse, national security and intelligence community analyst, former smuggler during the Cold War, and a spy novelist
- Hal Hilpirt, NFL player
- Charles S. Martz, American photographer, painter, inventor and entrepreneur
- Isaac V. McPherson, (March 8, 1868 – October 31, 1931), congressman from Missouri
- Frazier Glenn Miller, Jr., a white supremacist transplant from North Carolina known for his involvement with a Ku Klux Klan group and alleged perpetration of the Overland Park Jewish Community Center shooting in 2014
- Harvey Phillips, American tuba player and Distinguished Professor in the Jacobs School of Music at Indiana University Bloomington popularly known as Mr. Tuba
- James E. Ruffin, WWI First lieutenant, U.S. House Representative during the 73rd Congress
- Harold L. Turner, U.S. Army Sergeant, WWI Medal of Honor Recipient
- Lefty Williams, pitcher for 1917 World Series champion Chicago White Sox, banned after Black Sox Scandal
- Johnny Lee Wilson, exonerated prisoner wrongly convicted of the 1986 murder of Pauline Mart
