= Charles S. Martz =

American photographer, painter, inventor and entrepreneur

- Born: November 21, 1903
- Died: April 5, 1966 (aged 62)
- Occupations: Photographer; painter; inventor
- Title: Fellow of the Royal Photographic Society

Charles S. Martz (November 21, 1903 – April 5, 1966) was an American photographer, painter, inventor and entrepreneur.

Martz founded Tasopé Company in Aurora, Missouri in 1931. He created small photoengraving machines that could be used by small town newspapers to print photographs and patented several of these photo engraving machines. Martz quickly realized to sell his machines to newspapers, he would need trained photographers to help create the demand.

Martz trained photographers at Tasopé for the new field of "camera reporting." His students included Clifton C. Edom who has been called the "Father of Photo Journalism." Martz also designed and built Tasopé cameras.

Martz's work has been published in major photography journals of the period and his photographs and paintings were exhibited in New York City, Washington, DC, Chicago and St. Louis. He also judged photographic salons. In November 1944 the Smithsonian Institution Department of Engineering and Industries curated a special exhibit of 50 of Martz's "pictorial photographs."

Martz was a Fellow of the Royal Photographic Society, the Society's highest level of distinction. He was also an Associate of the Photographic Society of America. In 1941, the Society of Ozark Photographers recognized Martz' contributions to the field of photography.
