= Johnny Lee Wilson case =

1986 murder resulting in wrongful imprisonment

The Johnny Lee Wilson case refers to the murder of 79-year-old Pauline Martz of Aurora, Missouri in 1986 that resulted in the wrongful imprisonment of a 20-year-old man named Johnny Lee Wilson. He had confessed to the murder days after it occurred. As a result of a guilty plea, Wilson did not receive a trial by a jury, and was sentenced to life imprisonment without the possibility of parole in 1987. He was incarcerated from 1986 to 1995.

In September 1995, Wilson was pardoned by the governor of Missouri, Mel Carnahan, citing that Wilson's confession was coerced, and that there was no evidence tying him to the crime.

== Events ==
On April 13, 1986, 79-year-old Pauline Martz was found dead in her home in Aurora, Missouri. She was beaten, bound and gagged, and left for dead in her house, which had been set ablaze. The authorities also believed that she had been sexually assaulted. An autopsy would reveal that Martz died of carbon monoxide poisoning as a result of the fire. Several days later, the police brought in Johnny Lee Wilson, a mentally challenged twenty-year-old, for interrogation. He was interrogated for over four hours, before confessing to the murder.

Wilson was initially connected to the case through an eyewitness, who told police that Wilson revealed implicating information to him at the scene during the fire, though he would later recant his statements. Among the evidence against Wilson was women's underwear and jewelry that was found at his residence, which the authorities theorized was taken by him after the murder. However, the items were never confirmed as coming from the Martz home. Wilson was charged with first-degree murder and, in order to avoid the death penalty, pleaded guilty. He received a life sentence without parole.

In 1988, a man serving time for murder in Kansas, Chris Brownfield, confessed to the murder of Martz with an accomplice who was not Wilson. He told the authorities that they robbed Martz, and decided to burn the house down after losing a stun gun that had their fingerprints. However, his confession was deemed unreliable by officials.

== Appeals and exoneration ==
With the confession from Brownfield, Wilson filed a motion to receive a trial by a jury in June 1989. The judge, David Darnold, denied his motion, citing that Brownfield's confession was not credible. In addition, he also ruled that Wilson was capable of comprehending the charges against him despite his mental condition. In July 1991, the Supreme Court of Missouri denied Wilson's request for a trial by jury, concluding that he understood the guilty plea.

In 1993, Wilson requested a pardon from then governor of Missouri Mel Carnahan, which was granted in September 1995 after a year-long investigation of the case. It concluded that there was no physical evidence tying Wilson to the crime, and that the authorities took advantage of Wilson's mental defect to coerce a confession. However, Brownfield has not been prosecuted for the crime, nor anyone else, and the murder of Martz remains unsolved.

Wilson settled with Lawrence County for $615,000 in 2003, after filing a federal lawsuit.

== In the media ==
Wilson's case was featured on the television programs Unsolved Mysteries, The Reporters, and Inside Edition.

== See also ==
- Crime in Missouri
- List of unsolved murders (1980–1999)
- List of wrongful convictions in the United States
