= Jerry Sumners Sr. Aurora Municipal Airport =

- IATA: none; ICAO: none; FAA LID: 2H2

Summary
- Airport type: Public
- Owner: City of Aurora
- Serves: Aurora, Missouri
- Elevation AMSL: 1,434 ft (437 m)
- Coordinates: 36°57′44″N 093°41′43″W
- Interactive map of Jerry Sumners Sr. Aurora Municipal Airport

Runways
Direction	Length		Surface
Direction	ft	m	Surface
18/36	3,002	915	Asphalt

Statistics (2008)
- Aircraft operations: 8,900
- Based aircraft: 31
- Source: Federal Aviation Administration

Jerry Sumners Sr. Aurora Municipal Airport (FAA LID: 2H2) is a city-owned public-use airport located two nautical miles (2.3 mi; 3.7 km) southeast of the central business district of Aurora, a city in Lawrence County, Missouri, United States. It is included in the FAA's National Plan of Integrated Airport Systems for 2011–2015, which categorized it as a general aviation facility.

== Facilities and aircraft ==
The airport covers an area of 75 acres (30 ha) at an elevation of 1,434 feet (437 m) above mean sea level. It has one runway designated 18/36 with an asphalt surface measuring 3,002 by 60 feet (915 by 18 m).

For the 12-month period ending May 31, 2008, the airport had 8,900 aircraft operations, an average of 24 per day: 98% general aviation, 1% air taxi, and 1% military. At that time there were 31 aircraft based at this airport: 93.5% single-engine and 6.5% multi-engine.

== See also ==
- List of airports in Missouri
