= John G. Morris =

American journalist

- Born: December 7, 1916; Maple Shade, New Jersey, U.S.
- Died: July 28, 2017 (aged 100); Paris, France
- Education: University of Chicago (LAB, 1933 and AB, 1937)
- Occupations: Journalist, photoeditor, author
- Awards: Joseph A. Sprague Memorial Award National Press Photographers Association (1971); International Center of Photography (ICP) Writing Award for Get The Picture (1999); Professional Achievement Citation University of Chicago (2002); Dr. Erich Salomon Prize (2003); Prix Bayeux-Calvados des Correspondants de Guerre (2004); Chevalier of the Legion of Honour (2009); International Center of Photography (ICP) Lifetime Achievement Award (2010)

John Godfrey Morris (December 7, 1916 – July 28, 2017) was an American picture editor, author and journalist, and an important figure in the history of photojournalism.

== Early life and family background ==
Morris was born on December 7, 1916, in Maple Shade, New Jersey, and grew up in Chicago.

His father, John Dale Morris, born in 1869 on a Missouri farm, was a salesman who started out selling dictionaries, then encyclopedias. He founded a book publishing company named John D. Morris & Company of Philadelphia but went broke during the Panic of 1907. His father later worked for Chicago-based La Salle Extension University that provided extension courses.

His mother, Ina Arabella Godfrey, was the daughter of a doctor in Colon, Michigan. She studied Greek and Latin classics and joined the Grand Tour of Europe before working for John D. Morris & Company. She met John Dale Morris and they married in 1908, giving birth to their first child, a girl, in 1909.

== Career ==
At the University of Chicago, John G. Morris and friends issued a student newspaper Pulse in September 1937 which they published until March 1941, when America became involved in WW2. It was a bold attempt to launch their careers in journalism, described by Morris as; "a radically different college publication, its news section modelled on Time, a monthly survey in the manner of Fortune, and photographs of the candid-camera type, like those in Life" The colleagues went into professional careers: Paul Berg became a staff photographer for the St. Louis Post-Dispatch, John Corcoran for Science Illustrated, Myron Davis for Life, and David Eisendrath for the Chicago Times and New York's PM.

Morris graduated in 1938, then obtained a job in the mailroom of Time-Life publications before moving up to a role as Life's Hollywood correspondent, working for the weekly picture magazine throughout World War II and becoming Life's London picture editor. There, he was responsible for the coverage of the invasion of France on June 6, 1944 – D-Day, and edited the historic photographs of Robert Capa.

After the war he became successively the picture editor of the U.S. monthly Ladies' Home Journal, executive editor of Magnum Photos, assistant managing editor for graphics of The Washington Post in the 1960s and picture editor of The New York Times from 1967 to 1973.

He continued his career during the Vietnam War. In 1968 he insisted that a photo by Eddie Adams of the Associated Press (AP), showing a South Vietnamese police official in the act of executing a Viet Cong prisoner with a shot to the head, be run on the front page of the New York Times. Four years later, he selected another photo by Nick Ut, showing a naked and screaming Vietnamese girl fleeing a napalm attack.

In 1983, Morris moved to Paris, as the European correspondent of National Geographic. As a freelance writer and editor, his primary concern was working for peace. He turned 100 in December 2016.

== Personal life ==
Morris was married three times, first to Mary Adele Crosby who died in 1964 in childbirth along with the baby. His second wife, Marjorie Smith, died in 1981. His third wife, photographer Tana Hoban, died in 2006. He was survived by his partner, Patricia Trocme from Paris, along with four children (two children from his first marriage and another two from his second marriage) and four grandchildren. He died on July 28, 2017, at a hospital in Paris, aged 100.

== Awards ==
- 1971: Joseph A. Sprague Memorial Award, National Press Photographers Association (NPPA)
- 1999: International Center of Photography (ICP) Writing Award for Get The Picture: A Personal History of Photojournalism
- 2002: Professional Achievement Citation University of Chicago
- 2003: Dr. Erich Salomon Prize Lifetime Achievement Award for photojournalists by the German Society of Photography
- 2004: Bayeux-Calvados Awards for war correspondents
- 2009: Chevalier of the Legion of Honour
- 2010: International Center of Photography (ICP) Lifetime Achievement Award

== Publications ==
External videos
- Booknotes interview with Morris on Get the Picture, January 11, 1999, C-SPAN

His autobiography, Get the Picture: a Personal History of Photojournalism, was published in 1998. He was co-author of Robert Capa: D-Day, in French and English (Point de Vues, 2004).

In 2014, his book, Quelque Part en France - L'Été 1944 de John G. Morris (Somewhere in France - The Summer 1944 of John G. Morris), was published. The book was conceived by Robert Pledge of Contact Press Images. It contains the photographs Morris took during his Summer 1944 trip to Normandy, shortly after the D-Day landing on June 6, 1944, and the letters to his wife written "somewhere in France."

=== Publications edited by Morris ===
- Daily Maroon (The Chicago Maroon), University of Chicago student newspaper, 1933–37
- Pulse, University of Chicago student magazine, Editor, 1937–38
- Life, editorial staff, 1939-46 : New York, Los Angeles, Washington, London, Chicago, Paris
- Ladies' Home Journal, associate editor (pictures), 1946–52
- Magnum News Service, editor, 1961–63
- IPS Contact Sheet (Independent Picture Service), 1973–74
- The Washington Post, assistant managing editor (graphics), 1964–65
- Time Life Books, editor, 1966–67
- The New York Times, picture editor, 1967–74; editor, NYT Pictures, 1975–76
- Quest/77-79, contributing editor, 1977–79
- National Geographic, European correspondent, 1983–89

=== Publications by Morris or with contributions by him ===
- 1957: Tribute. ASMP Picture Annual. Ridge Press, New York.
- 1966: Great Combat Photos. Text by John G. Morris. Dateline, Overseas Press Club, New York.
- 1967: And/Or. Preface by John G. Morris. Harper & Row, New York.
- 1970: An Editor Speaks Out - From the Other Side of the Desk. Text by John G. Morris. NPPA.
- 1976: World Press Photo 1976. Foreword for annual publication by John G. Morris. World Press Photo, Teleboek bv., Amsterdam
- 1978: A Gentle Vision: Photographs by André Kertész. Text by John G. Morris. The Sunday Times, October 29.
- 1985: W. Eugene Smith: Let Truth Be the Prejudice. Illustrated biography by Ben Maddow, afterword by John G. Morris. Aperture.
- 1986: FD Paris 1986. Introductory chapter of Fodor's 1986 Travel Guide to Paris by John G Morris. Fodor's.
- 1998: Get the Picture: A Personal History of Photojournalism. Autobiographical book by John G.Morris. Random House, ISBN 0-226-53914-8. Second edition, University of Chicago Press, 2002. Foreword by William H. McNeill, afterword by John G Morris. ISBN 978-0-226-53914-0. Translated into French (Éditions de La Martinière, 1999), Japanese, Polish (Wydanie pierwsze, 2007), Italian (Contrasto Due, 2011), and Spanish (La Fabrica, 2013).
- 2004: Robert Capa: D-Day. Texts by Robert Capa and John G. Morris. Point de Vues, ISBN 978-2-9516020-7-6
- 2011: Robert Capa - Traces d'une Légende. Monograph by Bernard Lebrun and Michel Lefèbvre, preface by John G. Morris. Éditions de la Martinière, Paris
- 2014: Quelque Part en France - L'Été 1944 de John G. Morris ("Somewhere in France - The Summer 1944 of John G. Morris"). Book by John G. Morris, conceived by Robert Pledge. Marabout.

== TV and films about Morris ==
- 1987: Unterwegs. Werner Bischof - Photograph 51/52. Film by René Baumann and Marco Bischof. b/w, 50min (Switzerland)
- 1989: W. Eugene Smith - Photography Made Difficult. Film by Kirk Morris, 89 min (Phaidon, US)
- 1997: Decisive Moments - The Photographs That Made History. Documentary series by Tim Kirkby and Deboarh Lee for the BBC
- 2000: Chosen People. Documentary about the 12 People Are People the World Over families. Directed by Seona Robertson (Caledonia, Sterne and Wyld for the BBC)
- 2002: Guerre sans images - Algérie. Documentary by Mohammed Soudani (Amka Films)
- 2004: Horst Faas, Heroes Never Die (Los héroes nunca mueren). Documentary by Jan Arnold (Marea Films, Spain)
- 2004: Taking the Beach. Documentary by John Giannini for ABC News Nightline
- 2005: Looking for an Icon. Documentary by Hans Pool and Maaik Krijgsman (Nl)
- 2010: John G. Morris - Eleven Frames. Documentary by Douglas Sloan
- 2012: Get the Picture. Biographical documentary on Morris told by himself by Cathy Pearson (Ferndale Films, IE)
