= The Menace (newspaper) =

Anti-Catholic newspaper published in Aurora, Missouri

The Menace was a weekly newspaper published in Aurora, Missouri, that developed a circulation of 1.5 million nationwide with a virulently anti-Catholic editorial stance. It promoted itself as "The World's Headquarters for Anti-Papal Literature."

== History ==
The Menace was founded in 1911 by Wilbur Franklin Phelps within the first three years there were a million subscribers. It was an anti-Catholic publication. Along with the paper, the company also published anti-Catholic books and arranged engagements for anti-Catholic speakers.

The Menace was published in Aurora from 1911 to 1920. In December 1919, the publishing plant burned down, arson was suspected. Publishing was moved to Branson, Missouri, and the newspaper's name was changed to The New Menace. It was published there from 1920 to 1922. It then moved back to Aurora from 1922 to 1931. It was succeeded by The Monitor which was published in Aurora from 1931 to 1942. It ceased publication in December 1942.

Roman Catholic leaders took notice and clipped articles from the paper that alleged lewd behavior by priests, leading to federal prosecutors indicting the editors on suspicion of mailing obscene materials. The Menace won the obscenity trial held in Joplin, Missouri, in 1916.
