= Barbara Davidson =

Canadian photojournalist

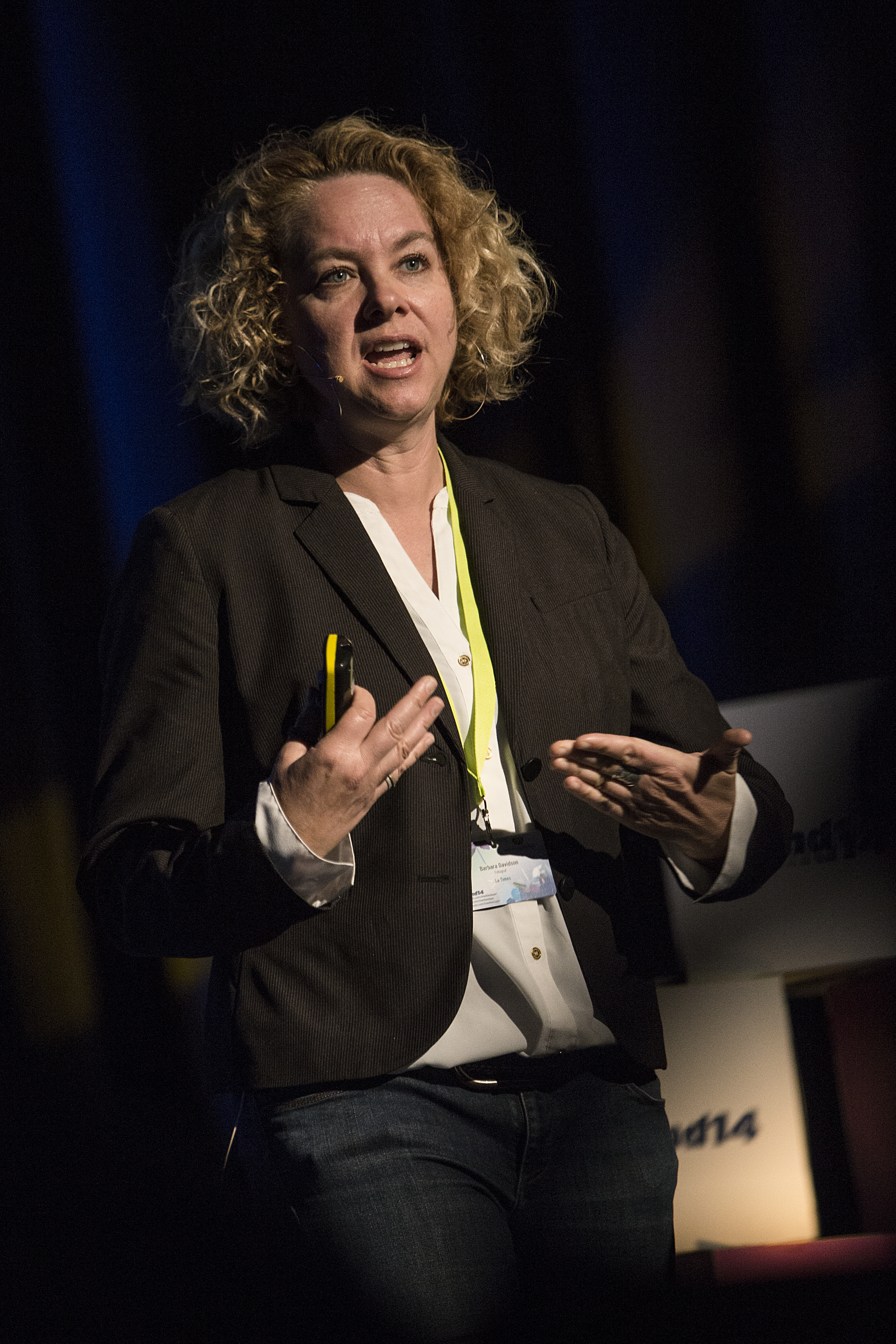
- Born: Montreal, Quebec, Canada
- Education: Concordia University
- Occupation: Photographer

Barbara Davidson is a Pulitzer Prize and Emmy award-winning photojournalist. She is currently a Guggenheim Fellow, 2019–2020, and is travelling the country in her car, with her two dogs, making 8x10 portraits of gun-shot survivors using an 8x10 film camera.

A former photographer at the Los Angeles Times until 2017, Barbara photographed women and children trapped in a culture of poverty and violence. After a long career as a staff photographer at the Washington Times, the Dallas Morning News, and the L.A. Times, Davidson left the Times to serve as lead creative and director of Volvo's SC60 Moments, an innovative campaign which used the car's safety camera system to create a photo exhibition. Photographs from the shoot were curated in an exhibition which premiered in London. The accompanying “making of” film has attracted more than 1.5 million views. She was also the lead photographer, and curator, for the Global partnership to “End Violence Against Children” where she documented the plight of children across 3 continents.

Davidson won the 2011 Pulitzer Prize for feature photography, and a National Emmy, for her work on innocent victims trapped in the crossfire of deadly gang violence in Los Angeles. Her photographs were also part of a staff entry that won the Los Angeles Times the 2016 Spot News Pulitzer for coverage of the San Bernardino mass shooting. While at the Dallas Morning News, her photographs were part of a team that won the 2006 Pulitzer Prize for breaking-news photography, for their coverage of Hurricane Katrina. She was twice named Newspaper Photographer of the Year by the Pictures of the Year International competition, first in 2006 and later in 2014.

In Iraq, Afghanistan, the Democratic Republic of Congo, Israel, Gaza, Kenya and Somalia her images capture the essence of humanitarian crisis in the wake of war, while her photographs from the 2004 Indian Ocean Tsunami, Hurricane Katrina and the Sichuan earthquake in China reveal the horrific aftermath of natural disasters. Beyond war and natural disasters, she has traveled widely for news assignments in Yemen, Nigeria, Rwanda, Nepal and throughout the United States and Canada.

In addition to her photographic work, Davidson curated a photography column ‘reFramed’ for the Los Angeles Times. She also mentors emerging photographers around the world. She was born to Irish immigrants in Montreal, Canada, and graduated from Concordia University with a Bachelor of Fine Arts degree in photography and film studies. In 2019, Davidson was awarded an honorary Doctorate of Laws from Concordia University. She is a dual citizen of Ireland and Canada.

== Biography and career ==
Davidson, born and raised in Montreal, Quebec, Canada and holds both Irish and Canadian citizenship. She graduated from Concordia University with a Bachelor of Fine Arts degree in Photography and Film Studies.

Davidson has worked for multiple news organizations including The Dallas Morning News, The Washington Times and The Record in Ontario, Canada and the Los Angeles Times as a staff photographer. Davidson has covered crisis in Iraq, Afghanistan, The Democratic Republic of Congo, Israel, and Gaza.

She was recently a special invitee at the 6th Biennial of Fine Art and Documentary Photography (now renamed the Barcelona Foto Biennale) at the FotoNostrum Gallery in Barcelona.

== Awards ==
In 2011, Davidson was awarded the Pulitzer Prize for Feature Photography "for her intimate story of innocent victims trapped in the city's crossfire of deadly gang violence." Davidson's work, "Caught in the Crossfire: Victims of Gang Violence" earned her an News & Documentary Emmy Award alongside five colleagues for their work for the Los Angeles Times.

Additionally, in 2011 Davidson was awarded The Community Awareness Award from University of Missouri's Pictures of the Year International for "Stray Bullets," coverage of victims of gang violence in Los Angeles County.

Davidson has twice, in 2006 and 2013, been named Newspaper Photographer of the Year by POYi. In 2006, Davidson, along with seven of her colleagues at The Dallas Morning News, received a staff Pulitzer Prize in Breaking News Photography for "its vivid photographs depicting the chaos and pain after Hurricane Katrina engulfed New Orleans."

In 2010, she won the Cliff Edom New American Award, from the National Press Photographers Association Best of Photojournalism competition for her project documenting the lives of Navajo Indians who live on a 1.6-million-acre (6,500 km^{2}) tract of tribal land in northeastern Arizona.

The Visa d'Or Daily Press award was given to Davidson in 2009 for coverage of the earthquake in China.
