= Władysław Sławny =

Polish photographer

Władysław Sławny (1907–1991) was a Polish photographer.

He grew up in a Jewish family among four other children. At the age of 12, he became interested in photography and constructed his first camera himself. He left school before his high school graduation and went to Paris. There he worked as a press photographer and became associated with the leftist community. His photos were published in "Vu" and "Regards" magazines.
