= Andrew MacCormac =

Irish-born Australian painter (1826–1918)

- Born: 23 December 1826; Banbridge, County Down, Ireland
- Died: 13 August 1918
- Known for: Portrait paintings
- Spouse: Emily Mary Johnson

Andrew MacCormac (23 December 1826 – 13 August 1918), frequently written McCormac was a portrait painter in South Australia.

== History ==
MacCormac was born on 23 December 1826 in Banbridge, County Down, Ireland and studied at Lee's Academy in London. His father John MacCormac was the town clerk of Banbridge County Down, Ireland. Andrew was persuaded to come to Australia by John Charles King, Town clerk of Melbourne, who was in England lobbying to stop the transportation of convicts to Victoria. MacCormac and his wife travelled by steamer Golden Age to Melbourne in 1854. He was ordained a minister of the Presbyterian Church, but at some stage became a Baptist. He moved to South Australia in 1868 and ministered to the Moonta Baptist Church for a year, then moved to North Adelaide where he turned professional portraitist in oils.

He was also a writer and poet of some ability. He published one small volume of verse Via Crucis; or Death and Life dedicated to Lord Hallam Tennyson.

He attempted painting landscapes, but those he exhibited at the Adelaide Easel Club, of which he was a member, were received without enthusiasm.

== Some portraits ==
- Sir Henry Ayers
- Hon. Allan Campbell
- Sir Richard Baker
- Sir John Cox Bray
- John Howard Clark
- Sir Lewis Cohen
- G. W. Cotton
- Daniel Cudmore
- John Darling, Sr.
- Rev. James Jefferis Congregationalist minister
- George S. Kingston
- John McKinlay
- Sir William Milne
- Sir John Morphett
- Hon. A. B. Murray
- Dr George Nott of Gawler
- Admiral W. J. S. Pullen
- Sir Robert Ross
- R. H. Shaw, bush artist not a commissioned painting
- Sir R. R. Torrens
- Rev. James Way Congregationalist minister (drawing)
- John Whinham, founder of North Adelaide Grammar School
- Silas Mead, founding minister of Flinders street Baptist Church, portrait hangs in Mead Hall at Flinders Street Baptist Church.

== Family ==
He married Emily Mary Johnson (21 March 1847 – 3 November 1898). Their children included:

- Alexander Henry MacCormac (11 February 1872 – 7 August 1944) married Esther May Leedham (6 May 1881 – 1 September 1958) on 14 September 1910 at the residence of her parents at Bowden on the Hill, SA
- Nicholas Chevalier MacCormac (17 June 1873 – 25 July 1956) married Margaret Mary Edith Turner (1879 – ) on 12 April 1906 in Goodwood, SA
- David Johnson MacCormac (7 December 1874 – )
- Mitchell Henry MacCormac (21 October 1874 – 29 October 1954) married Mary Louise McGregor (c. 1889 – 5 August 1930) on 14 January 1915 at the Methodist Parsonage South Terrace, Adelaide
- Idelette MacCormac (19 June 1868 – 8 June 1931) Never married
- Muriel MacCormac (12 November 1869 – 6 November 1939) married Harry Thomas Percy Macklin (1855 – 2 August 1902) on 19 August 1899 in Cuthburt Street Prospect, lived at Semaphore
- Emily Mary MacCormac (15 August 1880 – 7 November 1880)
- Irene MacCormac (7 March 1888 – 22 July 1963) married Friedrich Wilhelm Altmann (c. 1885 – 17 July 1954) on 16 October 1915, lived at Wilmington

They lived at Clifton Street, Prospect

== Recognition ==
- He was awarded a gold medal at the International Exhibition in London 1862.
- He was awarded a gold medal at the International Exhibition in London 1873.
- Samples of his work are held by the Art Gallery of South Australia.
- Several of his portraits adorn the chamber walls of the House of Assembly, Adelaide City Council and the Town of Gawler.
