= R. H. Shaw =

Richard Hussey Shaw (c. 1832 – 22 October 1895), dubbed "the Bush Artist", was a South Australian painter, whose early works are valued as records of Australian Aboriginal life in the earliest days of European settlement.

== History ==
Shaw was a son of George Reynolds Shaw of H M. 28th Regiment of Foot, who died in Liverpool in 1889; and grandson of Major H J. Shaw, of the Guards for H.R.H. the Duke of York. He arrived in South Australia some time around 1852.

He lived for some years at Glenelg, and worked as a scene painter, later at Port Lincoln, where he as known as a sailor and fisherman. In later years he lived in the city of Adelaide, at Hurtle Square, where he eked out a living producing Christmas cards and other artistic works in oils and pencil. He was particularly known for paintings of Aboriginal life. The Pictorial Australian of September 1893 carried a supplement of sketches by Shaw. He was a total abstainer and a generous worker for charitable causes.

He was also known as a versifier on topical subjects: The drought in India, The wreck of the Star of Greece, The Fire at Franklin Harbour raising money for the McCarthy family —A farmer who lost his wife and six of their children in a fire of suspicious origin— and Wreck of H.M. Flagship Victoria.

In 1895 he was reported as seriously ill and confined to his house. He had the support of friends and the local newspapers but maintained a precarious living as his infirmity progressed. Friends organised a concert to raise money.

His wife Fanny, often a pet name for "Frances", died in the Adelaide hospital in 1892. Shaw died in the Adelaide Hospital of "general debility" three years later. His two daughters, aged 10 and 19 were left without any means of support.

== Family life ==
His older son Richard Arundel Shaw (born in Burra 1862) was charged with vagrancy in 1874 and sentenced to the Industrial School for two years, Shaw to pay 20s. per month for his upkeep. Their mother, about whom nothing has been found, was admitted to be of unsound mind and living in Wallaroo. Their second son, William James Shaw (born 1868), was also uncontrollable and later in 1874 placed in the Industrial School for six months. Three years later he was convicted of vagrancy.

Shaw married Fanny Woodcock (c. 1847–1892) in 1875. He already had at least the two sons mentioned above, about whom nothing further has been found; their two daughters survived:

- Frances May Shaw (11 April 1876 – 1968) married Charles Bronner (died 26 February 1944) on 24 December 1907, lived at 3 Arundel avenue, Millswood.
- Eleanora Woodcock Shaw (1883 – 1900)

Little has been found about Fanny Shaw. In 1878 she was given a baby to mind by its grandmother, who was presumably anxious to avoid the social stigma of an illegitimate birth in the family. It died a week later from malnutrition.

== Works ==
Shaw was a prolific painter and many of his works are in galleries or collections. Four are mentioned in Design & Art Australia Online:

- Blacks in Full War Dress, undated watercolor held by the Art Gallery of South Australia
- Greenhill Road, Hazlewood Park, undated watercolor held by the Art Gallery of South Australia
- Aborigines in a Landscape, sold in Melbourne in 1974
- Aboriginals on the Murray River (1878), sold in Sydney in 1989

In 1946, Una Gertrude Saunders, of Regent street, Millswood, donated a set of framed paintings and sketches by Shaw to the board of the South Australian Museum.

The Artist at Work

A Native Group

An Encampment

== Recognition ==
The well-known South Australian portrait painter Andrew MacCormac is reported to have faithfully captured Shaw's likeness. Shaw is shown tramping through the bush, suitably attired, with a sketch book under his arm. The painting, titled "Bush Artist", was one of MacCormac's showings at the Adelaide Easel Club's 1893 Autumn Exhibition. The whereabouts of this painting are not known.
