= Lawrence County Bank Building =

- U.S. National Register of Historic Places
- Location within Missouri Location within the United States
- Location: 100 W. Commercial St., Pierce City, Missouri
- Coordinates: 36°56′41″N 94°0′10″W
- Area: less than one acre
- Built: 1892
- Architect: Legg, Jerome B.
- Architectural style: Romanesque Revival
- NRHP reference No.: 05000119
- Added to NRHP: March 10, 2005

The Lawrence County Bank Building is a historic bank building located at 100 West Commercial Street in Pierce City, Lawrence County, Missouri.

== Description and history ==
It was built in 1892, and is a rectangular, two-story, Romanesque Revival style buff brick building. It measures 25 feet by 100 feet. It features pairs of round arched windows and a prominent round arched, rusticated stone corner entrance surround. The building was heavily damaged during a tornado in May 2003.

It was listed on the National Register of Historic Places on March 10, 2005.
