= Howard Chapnick =

American photographer

Howard Chapnick (1922–1996) was an American editor, photo editor and a long-term leader of Black Star photo agency.

== Biography ==
Chapnick was born in 1922 in Manhattan, New York. He graduated from New York University.

In 1940 Chapnick joined a recently founded photo agency, Black Star. During World War II he served in the United States Air Force. In 1946 he returned to Black Star. He formed a new department responsible for photo essays and books. He also worked to make and maintain a network of photographers around the world. In 1964 Chapnick bought out the founders' shares and had been a president of the agency for 25 years.

He taught annual workshops at the University of Missouri School of Journalism. In 1994 he published a book called Truth Needs No Ally: Inside Photojournalism, summarising his many years of experience in the field of dealing with photojournalists.

Chapnick was a principal founder of the W. Eugene Smith competition and Memorial Fund, which awards grants for projects in humanist photography. After his death in 1996, the Fund established in his memory a grant to encourage and support leadership in fields ancillary to photojournalism.

== Bibliography ==
- Chapnick H. (1994). Truth Needs No Ally. Columbia: University of Missouri. p. 384.
