= Richard G. Shaw =

West Virginia insurance commissioner

- Born: July 25, 1943 (age 83); Clemson, South Carolina, United States
- Other name: Rick Shaw
- Education: South Carolina State University
- Occupation: insurance commissioner for the State of West Virginia from
- Years active: 1977–1985
- Spouse: Dr. Patricia Friday Shaw (m. 1966)
- Children: 3
- Parents: Lewis H. Shaw Sr. (father); Grace Williams (mother)

Richard G. Shaw (born July 25, 1943), generally known as Rick Shaw, served as insurance commissioner for the State of West Virginia from 1977 to 1985, under incumbent Governor Jay Rockefeller. Shaw was the first African American to serve as West Virginia insurance commissioner, and one of the first African Americans to head a West Virginia state agency overall. (Dr. Mildred Mitchell-Bateman was likely the first, becoming director of the West Virginia Department of Mental Health in 1962.)

During his tenure as insurance commissioner, Shaw was primarily noted for his ability to speak to the common man, as he enjoyed traveling throughout the state to meet personally with industry workers and hear their concerns. This was especially important during a period in which West Virginia was experiencing one of the worst economic crises in the state’s history.

Born in Clemson, South Carolina, to Lewis H. Shaw Sr., a minister and businessman, and Grace Williams, a homemaker, Richard Shaw graduated from South Carolina State University during the mid-1960s. He had wanted to attend a local primarily white college but was denied admission due to segregation.

After college, Shaw moved to Washington, D.C., where he married Dr. Patricia Friday Shaw in 1966, then a Howard University graduate student. The Shaws later moved to Wheeling, West Virginia, where Richard found work with a prominent insurance corporation until his appointment by Governor Rockefeller in 1977. Shaw then moved to Charleston, West Virginia, the capital.

At the end of Rockefeller’s tenure as governor, Shaw relocated again to Washington, D.C., with his family, at which time he became an ordained minister. (He should not be confused with a different Reverend Richard G. Shaw, who served as pastor of Georgetown Baptist Church from 1983 to 1990.)

Reverend and Dr. Shaw have three children and six grandchildren.
