= Myron Davis =

American photographer

Myron Davis (July 3, 1919 – April 17, 2010) was a staff photographer for LIFE magazine from 1942 to 1946. He photographed the American forces at their Lae landing in New Guinea and on Negros Island in the Philippines.

== Biography ==
Myron Davis was the son of a Kansas school teacher who later became registrar at a high school in Chicago. He took up photography after his mother explained how to process film and prints, constructing his own darkroom.

When at the University of Chicago he photographed for the student magazine, then for the alumni magazine and eventually for the university publicity office. He met Bernie Hoffman a LIFE photographer and, after dropping out of university, eventually was put on staff, their youngest recruit, in 1942, working in the Chicago bureau and then in Washington where he made portraits of President Franklin D. Roosevelt in the White House and of General Dwight D. Eisenhower at the Pentagon. In 1943 Davis became a war correspondent photographer for LIFE in the Southwest Pacific, assigned to General Douglas MacArthur's command, covering five invasions. His photographs featured on nine LIFE covers and his photograph of Deborah Kerr and Burt Lancaster locked in passionate embrace on a Hawaiian beach, taken for the 1953 movie From Here to Eternity, is one of his most frequently reprinted images.

After leaving LIFE for family reasons he directed a film for RKO Pathé in New York on the G.I. Bill college program and freelanced for Ladies Home Journal, Collier's, and the Saturday Evening Post, and worked for the Chicago Sun-Times. He then became managing editor for Advertising Age magazine.

He was injured when a fire broke out in his Hyde Park apartment and died at the University of Chicago Hospital, April 17, 2010, survived by sons Glenn and Keith and his daughter Mary.
