= Arthur Witman =

Arthur Witman (1902–1991) was a news photographer with the St. Louis Post-Dispatch and a distinguished spokesperson for his profession.

== Early career ==
Born in Lebanon, Pennsylvania, Arthur Witman learned photography while serving in the U. S. Army Air Force, 1923–1927. On discharge, he worked five years photographing for Fairchild Aerial surveys in Texas, and teaching in Chanute, Illinois.

== St. Louis Post-Dispatch photographer ==
In October 1932 he joined the St. Louis Post-Dispatch as a photojournalist covering news and as photographer for the society pages for which he covered such events as the Veiled Prophet Ball and the Municipal Opera.

In January 1939 in southern Missouri Witman documented hundreds of sharecroppers and their families who had been evicted from their homes and were camping, with their meagre worldly possessions, in the Missouri Bootheel and along the verges of rural Highway 61 in protest at their desperate plight. Missouri students and activists raised funds to purchase a plot of land near Poplar Bluff, Missouri for a group of the sharecroppers, an area that became known as "Cropperville”. Witman traveled there later in 1939 to document the community building efforts. His photographs bear witness to the living conditions of both African American and white families during the Great Depression.

== Pictures supplement ==
In October 1944, the Post assigned Witman to its Sunday supplement, Pictures magazine, printed in higher quality rotogravure with much in colour. For the supplement Witman produced picture essays to satisfy interest in local affairs. His prolific production spans St. Louis and Missouri history from the Great Depression to construction of the St. Louis Arch, and such historic events as U.S. presidential campaigns of Roosevelt, Truman, Eisenhower and Adlai Stevenson from the 1930s to the 1970s, inaugurations of Missouri governors Lloyd Stark and Phil Donnelly, speeches by Charles Lindbergh, A. Philip Randolph, Carl Sandburg, and Winston Churchill's 1946 "Iron Curtain" speech in Fulton.

He covered cultural occasions including concerts by Igor Stravinsky, Ella Fitzgerald, and Duke Ellington. Such big stories were interspersed with his features on regional events such as local balls, carnivals and parades, county fairs, chowder festivals, national bird and dog field trials and fox hunts, Ku Klux Klan revivals in Georgia, the civil rights movement, a group of religious rattlesnake handlers in Kentucky, and R. Buckminster Fuller's geodesic Climatron at the Missouri Botanical Garden.

His archive, chiefly 67,766 photographic negatives is now housed in the State Historical Society of Missouri and includes his imagery of baseball, boxing, Produce Row, steamboats, early aviation, a Negro baptism, horse racing, the unemployed, the military, war workers, union strikes, the state legislature, the Symphony, schools, scouts, colleges, the Art Museum, musicians, the police court, the public library, the city hospital, the morgue, the Zoo, and the prison.

Art Witman's photograph of an American audience laughing at show was curator Edward Steichen's first selected for the world-touring Museum of Modern Art exhibition The Family of Man that was seen by 9 million visitors.

== St Louis Arch project ==
Most outstanding is his documentation of the construction of the St. Louis Arch for Pictures, which became Art Witman's longest and most noted assignment. He visited the construction site frequently from 1963 to 1967 recording of every stage of progress. With assistant Renyold Ferguson, he crawled along the catwalks with the construction workers up to 190m above the ground. He was the only news photographer on permanent assignment at the construction, with complete access. He primarily worked with slide film, but also used the only Panox camera in St. Louis to create panoramic photographs covering 140 degrees. His head for heights is clear; in an image showing Ferguson lying prone to cautiously photograph from the edge of the apex of the completed arch, Witman is standing on the stainless steel surface to take his photograph of his companion. Equally vertiginous was the photograph the pair made from an eyrie where, perched on a plank at the peak of the nave of St Louis Cathedral, they encompassed a 'God's-eye view' of the whole congregation attending the funeral mass for a local cardinal.

== Contributions to the profession ==
Witman was active and outspoken in his advocacy for improvements in the professional status of photographers. From the mid-1930s he was a very early pioneer of the use of 35mm cameras in news photography for the Post, such as the Leica, developed in Germany in 1925 and used by the trailblazing Berliner Illustrierte Zeitung. He promoted it as smaller, easier to use, and perfectly adequate in resolution for the coarse dot screen used in newspaper reproduction, in an era when press equipment was the slow and cumbersome large format press camera that remained ubiquitous amongst American newspaper photographers into the 1960s. In 1945 Witman organized the St. Louis Press Photographers Association, dedicated to improving the professional status of photographers. The following year he helped found the National Press Photographer's Association on which he served two consecutive terms as president; 1954–1958. He used his position to decry the American Bar Association's prohibition of news photographers in the courtroom, and helped moderate the effects of that ban in several states. He wrote a column for NPPA's publication, The National Press Photographer, from 1954 to 1955 and joined Sigma Delta Chi, the fraternity of journalism professionals, and became a contributor to its journal, The Quill.

== Retirement activity ==
Retired from the Post in 1969, Witman nevertheless remained active, freelancing for Monsanto, the Missouri Botanical Garden and the Saturday Evening Post and teaching a photography class at Southern Illinois University and a workshop for the Winona School of Professional Photography. Though he planned a panoramic book of the St. Louis Arch for Doubleday & Company publishers, he was unable to complete it.

Art Witman died at his home in Richmond Heights on August 13, 1991.

== Honours ==
Witman was a National Geographic Magazine, Co-Director of Black Star Publishing Co., Carthage, and Board Member and member of the University of Missouri Board. He received the Joseph A. Sprague Memorial Award from NPPA in 1952, the UMC School of Journalism distinguished service award in 1964 and became a five-time winner of the annual TWA writing and photography competition. He was one of the first Inductees into the Photojournalism Hall Of Fame on October 24, 2005.
