= Rick Shaw (journalist) =

American journalist

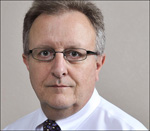
- Director; Pictures of the Year International
- Born: Richard F. Shaw
- Education: Master of Arts in Journalism, specializing in online platforms.
- Occupations: Journalist. educator, and manager University of Missouri; School of Journalism; Donald W. Reynolds Journalism Institute; Columbia, Missouri
- Title: Director of Pictures of the Year International
- Website: Rick Shaw: Journalism, Education, & Management

Richard F. Shaw (born Jan. 16, 1956) is the director of Pictures of the Year International (POYi), a photojournalism program, and an educator in visual journalism at the Missouri School of Journalism. He is a former manager and senior editor at several daily newspapers in the United States.

== Director of Pictures of the Year International ==
Pictures of the Year International's primary mission is to promote the work of photojournalists and foster professional development as a program of the Donald W. Reynolds Journalism Institute at the Missouri School of Journalism.

Shaw oversees the program's 72-year competition, coordinates worldwide exhibitions, cultivates the POYi Archive, and has launched new initiatives such as the POYi Latin America contest. Shaw joined the University of Missouri in 2004 as an assistant professor in the photojournalism sequence, teaching photo editing and management and serving as the director of photography for The Missourian, the student-produced daily city newspaper.

== Early life and education ==
Shaw is a native of Oklahoma City, Oklahoma, where he attended public school within the Putnam City School District and graduated from Putnam City West High School in 1974. His interest in photography began in high school as a photographer on the school's student newspaper, The Towne Cryer, and the yearbook, Patriot Profile. During his senior year, Shaw won first place as the state champion high school photographer in the Oklahoma Interscholastic Press Association annual competition. After graduating high school, he attended Central State University in Edmond, Ok (currently the University of Central Oklahoma), before transferring to the University of Missouri in 1976 to attend the School of Journalism. In 1978, he graduated with a Bachelor of Journalism degree in Photojournalism.

He holds a Master of Arts degree in Journalism, specializing in online journalism. His thesis research examined how Web-based news organizations' visual character, or visual personality, affects audience perceptions of credibility.

== Career ==
Shaw's prior newspaper career spans 27 years in editing and management. He began as a photojournalist and moved into photo editing, working for newspapers such as The Florida Times-Union in Jacksonville and The Sacramento Bee for 12 years. At The Bee, he served in a variety of roles including photo editor, assistant director of photography, and an assistant news editor. He was named director of photography and graphics at The Arizona Republic in Phoenix, and in 2001 joined the Hartford Courant as its director of design and graphics.

He has been recognized with several design and picture editing awards, including “Picture Editor of the Year” in POYi and NPPA competitions. In 1992, Shaw was part of the editing team for The Sacramento Bee that won the Pulitzer Prize for Public Service, responsible for both the photo editing and page design for the series, “The Sierra in Peril.” The Sacramento Bee and Hartford Courant both have won the Angus McDougall Overall Excellence in Editing Award.

As faculty for The Missourian, Shaw directed the student photo editing staff to two consecutive POYi photo editing portfolio awards, competing against professional newspapers nationwide — a Third Place Editing Portfolio during the 64th annual competition in 2007, and an Award of Excellence Editing Portfolio in 2006.

In 2006, the Donald W. Reynolds Journalism Institute named Shaw director of POYi. He continues as an adjunct faculty member in the photojournalism sequence at the Missouri School of Journalism, teaching visual editing for online multimedia.
