= Pictures of the Year International =

International photojournalism program founded in 1944

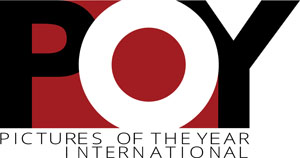
Pictures of the Year International

Pictures of the Year International (POYi) is a professional development program for visual journalists run on a non-profit basis by the Missouri School of Journalism's Donald W. Reynolds Journalism Institute. POYi began as an annual competition for photojournalism in 1944. POYi promotes the work of documentary photographers and magazine, newspaper, and freelance photojournalists.

POYi's projects have included the Pictures of the Year International Competition, an annual contest for documentary photographers and photojournalists; career-development symposiums and visual workshops for professionals and college students; Visions of Excellence, a series of exhibitions of award-winning photography; and the POYi Archive, comprising over 38,000 historic photographs.

== Pictures of the Year International Competition ==
The Pictures of the Year International Competition is for documentary photography, photojournalism, visual editing, and online multimedia. Each year more than 52,000 works are submitted to the contest by photojournalists from 71 nation. During three weeks of judging, a panel of 17 visual journalists selects 240 winners. Category topics include news, sports and portraits. The three-week review is set in a public forum, with live webcasting.

== Education and award programs ==
POYi provides educational and career development symposiums for photojournalists, which include lectures, workshops, one-on-one mentoring and portfolio reviews. POYi has held seminars in cities including Washington, D.C., Los Angeles, New Orleans, Chicago and San Francisco.

== Visions of Excellence ==
POYi develops exhibitions that are displayed in galleries, museums, libraries, and schools, entitled Visions of Excellence. POYi also creates themed exhibitions culled from the POYi Archive on topics such as the presidency of the United States, the Olympic Games, and African-American history. POYi exhibits have been displayed in the Newseum in Washington, D.C., the Annenberg Space for Photography in Los Angeles, the International Photo Festival in Korea, the LOOK3 Charlottesville Festival of the Photograph in Virginia, and the Louisiana State Museum for PhotoNOLA in New Orleans.

== Emerging Vision Incentive ==
POYi at one time conducted an annual Emerging Vision Incentive program that provided $10,000 in funding for aspiring or early-career photojournalists to produce in-depth documentary projects that target a specific social issue.

== POYi Archive ==
In 2008, POYi and the University of Missouri's School of Information Science and Learning Technologies began a collaborative project to create a Web platform to host the digital archive of all the winning photographs in POYi's collection. The Archive was launched in September 2008 and uses the Omeka content management system. The POYi Archive contains more than 40,000 photographs.

== History ==
Pictures of the Year International began as a news photography contest in the spring of 1944 when University of Missouri professor Clifton C. Edom and his wife, Vi, founded the First Annual Fifty-Print Exhibition contest. Its stated purpose was "to pay tribute to those press photographers and newspapers which, despite tremendous war-time difficulties, are doing a splendid job; to provide an opportunity for photographers of the nation to meet in open competition; and to compile and preserve ... a collection of the best in current, home-front press pictures."

During that first year of the contest, 60 photographers entered 223 prints. In 1945 the Edoms also founded the College Photographer of the Year contest, and in 1949 they launched the Missouri Photo Workshop.

In 1948, following a decision to invite magazine photographers to participate, the Fifty-Print Exhibition Contest became the "ews Pictures of the Year Contest. Then, in 1957, the University of Missouri and the National Press Photographers Association (NPPA) merged their respective contests. Through this partnership, Pictures of the Year continued until 2001 when NPPA and Missouri parted ways. POYi is now administered by the Donald W. Reynolds Journalism Institute at the Missouri School of Journalism.

Guided by former directors Angus McDougall, Bill Kuykendall, and David Rees, the scope of Pictures of the Year changed dramatically between the 1970s and 2000. The number of entered images increased to tens of thousands, and in 2001 Pictures of the Year became an international program — Pictures of the Year International.

In 2006, POYi became a program of the Donald W. Reynolds Journalism Institute and named Rick Shaw as its full-time director.
