= Missouri School of Journalism =

American journalism school

- Type: Public
- Established: 1908
- Founder: Walter Williams
- Parent institution: University of Missouri
- Dean: David Kurpius
- Faculty: 80+
- Students: 2,250+
- Undergraduates: 2,000
- Postgraduates: 250
- Location: Columbia, Missouri, U.S. 38°56′53″N 92°19′42″W
- Website: journalism.missouri.edu

The Missouri School of Journalism, housed under the University of Missouri in Columbia, is one of the oldest formal journalism schools in the world. The school provides academic education and practical training in of journalism and strategic communication for undergraduate and graduate students across several media platforms including television and radio broadcasting, newspapers, magazines, photography, and new media. The school also supports an advertising and public relations curriculum.

Founded by Walter Williams in 1908, the school publishes the city's Columbia Missourian newspaper and produces news programming for the market's NBC-TV affiliate and NPR member radio station.

In its "Missouri Method," in addition to classroom study students practice journalism in real-world outlets. The Missouri School of Journalism has been ranked the best Jounalism School in the United States multiple times by the NewsPro–RTDNA survey.

In 1930, the school established its Missouri Honor Medal for Distinguished Service in Journalism. The faculty selects medalists based on lifetime or superior achievement for distinguished service; each year a different aspect of journalism is selected for recognition. In 1960, the school established the Penney-Missouri Awards to recognize women's page journalism "that went beyond traditional content." In 1994, the awards were renamed the Missouri Lifestyle Journalism Awards.

== History ==
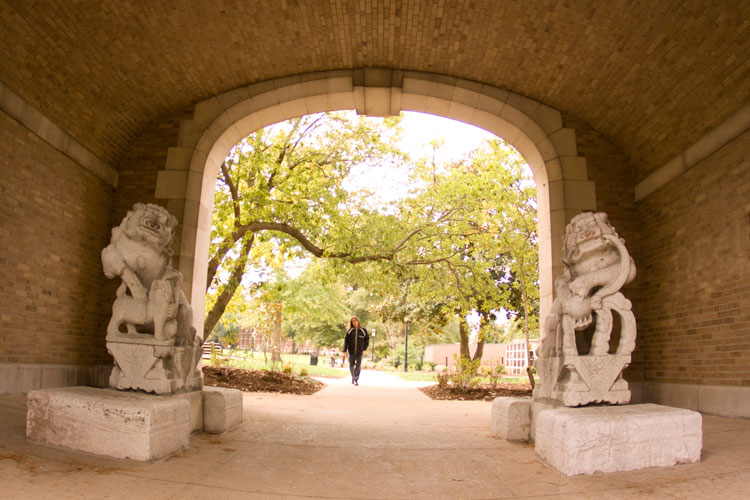
Two stone lions, a gift to the school by the Chinese government in 1931, grace the arch between Neff and Walter Williams Halls.

The school opened on September 14, 1908. Its founding was urged by Joseph Pulitzer, following lobbying by Walter Williams, the editor of the Columbia (Missouri) Herald and a university curator. Williams became the official founder. This came 13 years after the defeat in the Missouri State Senate of a bill to establish a chair of journalism at the University of Missouri. Previously newspapers usually required apprenticeships. The Missouri Press Association began supporting the proposal in 1896.

The first day's class published the first issue of the University Missourian, which was to become the Columbia Missourian. Williams was the first dean. Among the original faculty members was Charles Griffith Ross, who would become press secretary for President Harry S. Truman. It was initially based in Switzler Hall.

In 1910, the school began its Journalism Week celebration. On March 10, Kappa Tau Alpha was founded.

In 1919, Jay Holcomb Neff Hall, the first building formally assigned to the school, was built by a donation from Andrew Neff, a 1913 journalism graduate, in honor of his dead father, a former Kansas City, Missouri mayor and publisher. At the time, it was the largest donation in the university history.

In 1921, the school offered the world's first master's degree in journalism. In 1930, it created the Missouri Honor Medal for Distinguished Service in Journalism. In 1934, it offered the world's first Doctor of Philosophy degree in journalism. In 1936, the school began offering broadcast courses in conjunction with KFRU, the radio station owned by the St. Louis Star-Times.

In 1944, Professor Clifton C. Edom and his wife Vi, in association with the school, developed the "News Pictures of Year Competition and Exhibition," now "Pictures of the Year International". A year later, they started the "College Photograph of the Year" program.

In 1953, the university launched KOMU-TV, the only university-owned full-power commercial television station in the US, used as a training lab for students who provide its news programming. In 1958, the school opened the Freedom of Information Center, the world's first academic center dedicated to the topic. In 1971, the school switched its radio news programming to KBIA, a National Public Radio station.

In 1957, George McElroy, a pioneering black journalist from Texas, became the first African American to receive a master's degree in journalism from the university.

== Professional organizations ==
Affiliated professional organizations and programs include:

- American Society of News Editors;
- Investigative Reporters and Editors and its subsidiary
- National Institute for Computer-Assisted Reporting (NICAR);
- National Freedom of Information Coalition;
- Pictures of the Year International; and
- Religion Newswriters Association.

== Accreditation ==
- Accrediting Council on Education in Journalism and Mass Communications.

== Notable alumni ==
- John Anderson – ESPN Sportscenter anchor
- Meredith Artley – Former editor-in-chief of CNN.com
- Gerald M. Boyd – Former Managing Editor, The New York Times
- Russ Buettner — Pulitzer Prize winning reporter for The New York Times
- Jann Carl – Former correspondent for Entertainment Tonight
- Marcia Chatelain – Pulitzer Prize winning writer and historian
- Sophia Choi – Former CNN host/reporter
- Pat Forde – Former columnist for ESPN, current columnist for Sports Illustrated
- Martin Frost – Former U.S. Representative from Texas's 24th district
- Major Garrett – CBS News Chief White House Correspondent
- Marie Hansen – Life photojournalist
- Adrian Holovaty – Creator of Django, a web framework
- Haynes Johnson – Pulitzer Prize winning reporter
- Phil Keating – Fox News National Correspondent
- Michael Kim – ESPN Sportscenter anchor
- Jim Lehrer – Former Host of PBS NewsHour
- Joe Mahr – Pulitzer Prize winning investigative journalist for the Chicago Tribune
- Richard Matheson – Horror and sci-fi author whose works include I Am Legend and Somewhere in Time
- Mary McNamara – Pulitzer Prize Winning for Criticism 2015
- Russ Mitchell – Former anchor of CBS Evening News and The Early Show; current reporter for WKYC
- Joel Meyers – Voice of the New Orleans Pelicans
- Lisa Myers – Former Investigative reporter with NBC News
- Ken Paulson – Former Editor-In-Chief, USA Today
- Brad Pitt – Actor (attended; did not graduate)
- Chuck Roberts – Former CNN host/reporter
- Mark Russell - Executive Editor, The Commercial Appeal and Former Editor, Orlando Sentinel
- Jackson Scholz - 1920/24/28 Olympic sprinter, prolific author of sports fiction, portrayed in Chariots of Fire (1981)
- George C. Scott - Actor (attended; switched his major to English and drama)
- Jon Scott – Host of Happening Now on the Fox News Channel
- Brad Sham – Voice of the Dallas Cowboys
- Ram Subhag Singh – Indian Politician, first Leader of the Opposition in Lok Sabha
- Bob Sullivan – New York Times Bestseller and founding member of MSNBC
- Wright Thompson – ESPN senior writer
- Brian Timpone – Conservative businessman, former TV reporter (KDLH CBS 3) and media entrepreneur
- Nischelle Turner – Co-host of Entertainment Tonight
- Elizabeth Vargas – Host of ABC News' 20/20, former anchor of World News Tonight
- Matt Winer – Former ESPN Sportscenter anchor, current Turner Sports host
- Nick Young -- Retired anchor of CBS World News Roundup
- Thomas Jefferson Young – Novelist
