= Ed Feingersh =

American photojournalist (1925 - 1961)

- Ed Feingersh photographed by ©Julia Scully in NYC, 1952
- Born: Edwin Feingersh; April 21, 1925; New York City, U.S.
- Died: June 21, 1961 (aged 36); New York City, U.S.
- Other names: Edward, Eddie
- Education: New School of Social Research
- Occupation: Photojournalist
- Agent: PIX Publishing
- Spouse: Miriam Sakol (m. 1957; ann. 1957) (b.1933)

Edwin Feingersh (April 21, 1925 – June 21, 1961) was an American photojournalist and technical writer/reviewer. He studied photography under Alexey Brodovitch at the New School of Social Research. He later worked as a photojournalist for the Pix Publishing agency. His talent for available light photography under seemingly impossible conditions was well recognised. His pictures of Marilyn Monroe are his best known, but he was a prolific photojournalist throughout the 1950s. Two of his moody photographs of jazz performers were selected by Edward Steichen for MoMA's world-touring The Family of Man exhibition.

== Career ==
Ed Feingersh, Combat Photo, Korea, 1953

Edwin (a.k.a. Edward, commonly 'Ed' or 'Eddie') Feingersh was born in Brooklyn on April 21, 1925, the second of three sons of Harry Feingersh, a women's fashion designer and Rae Feingersh (née Press). His Jewish grandfather Abraham, a tailor, migrated to America from Moldavia in 1913 to escape the pogroms. Ed Feingersh majored in art at Manhattan's Haaren High School.

He took up photography while serving in Germany in the Army, where he bought an inexpensive 35-mm camera. After the war, with the assistance of the G.I. Bill, he first attended New York University, where he joined the camera club, and later enrolled in Alexey Brodovitch's photography course at the New School for Social Research. He worked during this period as assistant to Gjon Mili. This experience, and photographs he took for the course secured work as a 22-year-old stringer with Pix Publishing photo agency in 1948.

For PIX he produced stories for major magazines including a day in the life of a woman doctor published in McCall's in 1951; moody and revealing scenes from a Tokyo night club for Argosy men's magazine; a report on German war orphans for Redbook; a study of a disturbed boy's psychological rehabilitation; and the story "The Great Rock 'n' Roll Controversy', both for Look, in addition to making a portrait series of Albert Schweitzer in New York and covering a night fighter squadron's mission over Greenland.

At PIX he worked alongside the agency photographers Alfred Eisenstaedt, George Karger, Jerry Cooke, Eileen Darby (Lester), Robert and Cornell Capa, George Zimbel, Bob Schwalberg, Lawrence Fried, Bob Henriquez, and Garry Winogrand whom Feingersh introduced to the photo agency.

His coverage of the Korean War, particularly the Battle of Pork Chop Hill (1953), involved Feingersh carrying in addition to his cameras, the gun, pack, and other standard G.I. equipment, nevertheless, he produced imagery with his wide-angle lens that conveyed a charged, first-person perspective. The work was published in Pageant and Argosy.

== Method and reception ==
In a 1949 article in Modern Photography Feingersh urged colleagues to 'Break The Rules', while Minicam noted that "Subways are just one of the tough subjects that Ed Feingersh has tackled. His pictures in the snow and rain, in the bad light of street corners at night are all part of his way of seeing with his camera:"

"My approach is emotional rather than intellectual; I want to see something, absorb it and become a part of it, and get a picture of it. I can't stand flash because it destroys the mood and brings in artificial values. When I take pictures on a subway I want the final print to smell like a subway..."

In his devotion to available light photography, Feingersh would shoot with a handheld camera at full aperture and at shutter speeds as low as ½ second, and with film that he would push-develop, adapting his approach to the resultant blur, coarse grain and/or shallow depth of field. Carlton Brown (whose author photo is by Feingersh) in his 1955 book Famous Photographers Tell How, details Feingersh's approach, beside those of Hal Reiff, Ewing Krainin, Jerry Cooke, Homer Page, Irving Haberman, Max Desfor, and Hy Peskin:

In a crowd or at a public event, Feingersh's moderately short stature and his self-effacing manner contribute further to his goal of making himself "the invisible man." He does not, however, practice the aloofness from his subject which some photographers favor. He believes, instead, in establishing close contact with the people he is photographing, in making himself a part of a human situation in order to understand it and record it from within. Intense, quick and warmly responsive in his reactions, he often gets so absorbed in his subject that he loses track of the time and of his comfort, and expends himself far beyond the requirements of his assignment.

Feingersh developed a reputation for putting himself at risk to get the eye-catching shot the magazine editors craved; parachuting with paratroopers, lying right in the path of stunt cars and having himself tied to the periscope to photograph a submarine diving.

=== Marilyn Monroe ===
Ed Feingersh, Self-Portrait with Marilyn Monroe 1955

Ed Feingersh photographed Marilyn Monroe for Redbook magazine in March 1955 for a story which would follow Monroe through her daily routine, the photography to be candid and shot without flash in available light. The actress and her new production-company partner Milton Greene recommended him to the magazine as their choice.

The photographs he made of her during the week March 24–30, 1955 as she prepares for two appearances; opening night of Cat on a Hot Tin Roof at the Morosco Theatre, and being fitted with a burlesque corset for her ride on a pink elephant at a charity event at Madison Square Garden, were the only candid images of the actress made specifically for publication. An example is a wide angle shot of the corseted Monroe, reflected in a mirror, with an out-of-focus self-portrait of the photographer holding a Nikon S2 fitted with 35mm lens, the camera he tested for Popular Photography that year, and the rangefinder camera brand he customarily used, and which was starting then to be adopted by picture magazines in America previously wary of Japanese equipment. Here, as with his Korean War imagery, in stripping away the artificial fourth wall of "objective" distance, Feingersh’s candid, first-person methodology anticipated how New Journalists would later embed themselves into their stories, often to become a protagonist; where traditional journalism focused on the 'marquee' event, Gonzo and New Journalism, famously in Gay Talese's 1966 "Frank Sinatra Has a Cold" (for Esquire), revealed telling details in the apparently mundane, quiet moments between events.

Redbook asked Feingersh to repeat the exercise in 1957, and he accepted their assignment to photograph Audrey Hepburn and Mel Ferrier in Paris, again candidly, capturing their actions in dance rehearsals under difficult low-light conditions requiring shutter speeds of 1/15 sec. and lower.

In 2013 Chanel ran an advertising campaign using a recorded interview with Monroe in which she is asked about her use of Chanel No.5 fragrance. It featured Feingersh's photograph of the actress splashing herself with a bottle of the perfume.

== Late career and legacy ==
Robert Stein, then editor of Redbook magazine and later, president of the American Society of Magazine Editors, was a close friend of the photographer. He reports (in 2005) that Feingersh suffered depression between his bouts of frenetic activity, and in the years immediately after the Monroe shoot, and after a brief, failed marriage (1957) to Miriam (Mimi) Sakol (b.1933), he gave up photography.

Stein subsequently invited him to join him at Redbook as picture editor, but Feingersh soon succumbed to alcoholism, poor mental and physical health, neglected his work and died 'in his sleep' on the morning of June 21, 1961, at the home of friends in Manhattan, New York. He was buried in the family plot at Prospect Park in Brooklyn.

Full of praise for his colleague's photography, Stein says that many want to see 'Eddie's' work in public collections of 'museums to give him the recognition he deserves'. His collection is now in the archives of Life Magazine and Getty Images and in the process of being edited and scanned, many of which can be found on gettyimages.com.

In 1987, 26 years after Ed Feingersh died, photography collector Michael Ochs uncovered a cache of several rolls of negatives and proofs that revealed the unpublished images from the Monroe series. This collection is held by Getty Images and consequently they are the most seen of Feingersh's photojournalistic output, accessed via countless Monroe fansites.

== Books ==
- Feingersh, Ed; LaBrasca, Bob; Michael Ochs Archives (1990), Marilyn : March 1955, Delta, ISBN 978-0-385-30119-0
- Gombeaud, Adrien (2011), Une blonde à Manhattan : Ed Feingersh et Marilyn Monroe, Serpent à plumes; Monaco : Rocher, ISBN 978-2-268-07129-9

== Selected articles illustrated by Ed Feingersh ==
- Argosy's Tips from Photographers, (cl) Argosy Jul 1952
- Argosy's Tips from Photographers: Mistakes That Make Pictures, (cl) Argosy Jul 1953
- Dave Chambers’ $2,000,000 Worth of Horses, (pi) Argosy Mar 1955
- The Hot-Seat Drag, (pi) Argosy Jul 1954
- How Red China Gets Dope to Our GIs, (pi) Argosy Feb 1954
- Irish Horan's Hell Drivers, (pi) Argosy Jun 1953
- The Last Patrol, (pi) Argosy Dec 1953
- Mistakes That Make Pictures, (cl) Argosy Jul 1953
- Nice Work If You Can Get It, (pi) Argosy May 1954
- Pictures Tell the Story: The Hot-Seat Drag, (pi) Argosy Jul 1954
- Pictures Tell the Story: The Last Patrol, (pi) Argosy Dec 1953
- What will happen to this boy?, produced by George B. Leonard, Jr., Look, v. 19, no. 21 (October 18, 1955), p. 137-144. 15 images.
- The Private Takes a Wife, (pi) Redbook Dec 1955
- Vice Squad, (pi) Adventure Dec 1954
- The great rock 'n' roll controversy, Look, v. 20, no. 13 (June 26, 1956), p. 40-41, 42, 45, 47. 12 images
- Mike Wallace, Look, March 21, 1957
- You Can't Miss! (with Robert Bridgeport), (ar) Argosy Mar 1959

== Bibliography ==
- Russel, J. (1989). Marilyn Monroe and the camera. Bulfinch P. Books.
- Greer, H. (2001). Immortalizing the ephemeral. The World & I, 16(6), 84.
- Zoom (NL) 1990, I/1, p. 38-45 (NFM)
- Van Ham Kunstauktionen: Photographie 254. Auktion, 11. Mai 2007 (2007) (NFM)
