= PIX Publishing =

American photography agency 1935–1969

PIX, Inc was an early New York City photo agency which followed European, particularly German, precedents. From 1935 to 1969 it supplied news and feature photos to magazines, especially Life and, later, Sports Illustrated.

== Formation ==
The agency was founded in New York City at 250 Park Avenue in November 1935 by Leon Daniel and Celia Kutschuk. It pre-dates the more famous Magnum (begun in 1947). Born in Ukraine, Kutschuk had studied photojournalism at Rhine University, and both had worked as picture editors at the Associated Press office in Berlin, which was headed by American Louis Lochner from 1928 until 1941, when Germany and the United States declared war and Lochner was held and then deported as an enemy alien. Jewish employees were sacked, and many fled Europe.

== European roots ==
PIX acted as an intermediary between émigré photographers and the American magazine and newspaper market, profiting from the development of photojournalism in the USA in the 1930s onwards. As many of the photographers for PIX were naturalized American citizens, they were not allowed in the war theaters during WWII, so they stayed home and covered the home front, though during the Korean War and Cold War, Ed Feingersh produced striking reportage.

== The photographers ==
The first-signed photographers of the agency were Alfred Eisenstaedt (1898–1995) and Georg Karger (1909–1973). Eisenstaedt was the best-known member of PIX and until the 1950s credited his work to PIX, Inc. He left PIX about 1957 over a royalty disagreement. Robert Capa and Cornell Capa were also briefly associated with PIX (Cornell worked as a printer in the laboratory). Karger, a German, left banking for a career in stage photography.

Jerry Cooke (b. Yuri Kutschuk, 1922–2005) was the nephew of Celia Kutschuk and initially worked in the agency darkroom before becoming a photographer and producing work for Life, Fortune, Collier's, Time, Sports Illustrated and European publications.

Lawrence Fried (1926–1983), a World War II veteran, worked steadily as a photo-journalist for The Saturday Evening Post, The New York Times, Vogue, Collier's, and Parade Magazine with over 70 covers for Newsweek. He was the recipient of the Photographer of the Year award by the Overseas Press Club, the Outstanding Service to ASMP award and the Benjamin Franklin Award.

Eileen Darby (1916–2004) worked in the PIX darkroom from 1937, in the same way as Cornell Capa, but from 1939 started photographing for the agency, which sent her on theatrical assignments, since players and producers were used to female photographers, and she subsequently founded her own agency, Graphic House, in 1941.

Other PIX photographers included Hans Knopf (1907–1967), Ed Feingersh, Bob Schwalberg, Lawrence Fried, Bob Henriques, Garry Winogrand, and George Zimbel.

== Cessation ==
PIX was dissolved in 1969 with the rise of television which displaced the big picture magazines and most of its members moved their business to other picture agencies.

== Legacy ==
An archive of PIX photos was amassed by Emil Klinsky (1899–?). The Spaarnestad collection in the National Archives of The Netherlands in The Hague contains photos distributed by PIX to Dutch publishing companies. The Spaarnestad collection does not contain a separate PIX archive. The photos in these archives coming from publishing companies are filed away according to subject not by the names of the photo bureaus. As far as the information goes of Spaarnestad Photo the copyrights of PIX material remained with the photographers.
