= Richard Snodgrass =

Richard Snodgrass may refer to:

- Richard T. Snodgrass, American computer scientist and writer
- Richard Bruce Snodgrass, American writer and photographer
