= Nancy Floyd =

American photographer

- Born: 1956 (age 69–70); Monticello, Minnesota
- Occupation: Photographer

Nancy Floyd, born in Monticello, Minnesota in 1956, is an American photographer. Her photographic subjects mainly concern women and the female body during youth, pregnancy, and while aging. Her project She's Got a Gun comprises portraits of women and their firearms, which is linked to her Texas childhood. Floyd's work has been shown in 18 solo exhibitions and is held in the collections of the Museum of Contemporary Photography and the High Museum of Art. Floyd is a professor emeritus of photography at the Ernest G. Welch School of Art and Design at Georgia State University.

== Education ==
Floyd received her BFA from the University of Texas at Austin (1982). She then went on to receive her kaster's degree from Columbia College Chicago (1985) and later her Master of Fine Arts, MFA (1987), from the California Institute of the Arts.

== Photography ==
=== Weathering Time ===
Beginning in 1982, Floyd began photographing herself daily, taking more than 2,500 photos of herself. These photographs focus on the female body, the passing of time, and the loss of family members. Cultural and technological changes are also noted through her self-portraits through accompanying fashion and settings. The work is a reflection of Floyd's personal experiences with aging and mortality by documenting herself in her personal environment to record her own transformations over time. Floyd sought not only to document the passing of time but also to produce work that expressed information about her own generational context. This specific series of work was exhibited in many different galleries and Floyd received multiple awards and scholarships for this series including the ICP / GOST First Photo Book Award.

=== She's Got a Gun ===
To better understand her deceased brother and his love for firearms, Floyd purchased her own gun and discovered a love for the sport and the people she met through it. She began cataloging a visual history of women and guns. In 2008, Floyd published her first book titled, She's Got a Gun, which includes 35 images taken by Floyd of women with guns. The book references American gun women, but it is also a memoir of her Texas childhood since she lost her brother to the Vietnam war at a very young age.

=== 10.9 ===
10.9 is another series of photographs that relates closely to Floyd's own love for firearms and the strong women she chooses to photograph. This collection displays images and videos of female competition shooters.

=== The James M. Floyd Memorial ===
This series of works is a collection of photographs devoted to the brother that she lost when she was only twelve years old. These photographs explore Floyd's feelings about what happened to her brother who died while fighting for the army.

=== Walking Through the Desert with My Eyes Closed ===
Walking Through the Desert with My Eyes Closed is a series of videos of Floyd's feet and the ground as she walks through a desert. Some of these videos include music to go along with the work. The work was exhibited in a solo exhibition at Whitespace Gallery, in Atlanta, Georgia in 2021.

== Exhibitions ==
Nancy Floyd has exhibited 18 solo exhibitions and more than 70 group shows. Her exhibitions have been featured in the United States, Japan, and Europe, and include the following galleries:

- "Weathering Time"
  - Blue Sky Gallery, Portland, OR (July 3–28, 2019, solo)
  - CUE Art Foundation, New York, NY (September 7 – October 21, 2017, solo)
  - Whitespace, Atlanta, Georgia (November – December 2, 2017, solo)
  - Flux Projects, Atlanta, Georgia (2011, solo)
- "Everyday Is Ordinary", Blue Star Contemporary Art Museum, San Antonio, TX (June 4 – August 9, 2015)
- "Georgia Artists Selecting Georgia Artists", Museum of Contemporary Art of Georgia, Atlanta, Georgia (June 22 – August 24, 2013, group)
- Thyssen-Bornemisza Museum, Madrid, Spain (March 8 – June 5, 2011, group)
- Atlanta Contemporary Art Center, White Column, New York, NY
- California Museum of Photography, Riverside, CA
- Center for Creative Photography, High Museum of Art and Lightwork

== Selected solo exhibitions ==
- Whitespace, Atlanta, GA. Walking Through the Desert with My Eyes Closed (2021)
- Joshua Tree Art Gallery, Joshua Tree, CA. She's Got a Gun (2018)
- CUE Art Foundation, New York, NY. Weathering Time (2017)
- Whitespace, Atlanta, GA. Weathering Time (2017)
- The Pearl Conard Art Gallery, Ohio State University, Mansfield, OH. Weathering Time (2015)
- Flux, Atlanta, GA. Weathering Time, 1982–2010: Video Projection (2011)
- Quickshot, Atlanta, GA. Organized by Solomon Projects. Olympic Shooters (2011)
- Brenau Gallery, Brenau University, Gainesville, GA. She's Got a Gun (2009)
- Solomon Projects, Atlanta. She's Got a Gun (2008)
- Hallie Ford Museum of Art, Willamette University, Salem, OR. James M. Floyd Memorial (2006)
- Solomon Projects, Atlanta. Weathering Time, video projection (2003)
- Atlanta Contemporary Art Center, Atlanta, GA. Weathering Time (2002)
- Natalie and James Thompson Art Gallery, San Jose State University, San Jose, CA. Stopping Power ( 1998)

== Selected group exhibitions ==
- SHOWING (WORK X FAMILY): (2019) The Art Gallery at the Fulginiti Pavilion, Center for Bioethics and Humanities, University of Colorado, Aurora, CO (2018) University Art Gallery, California State University Stanislaus, Turlock, CA. (2019)
- Space Nau Bostik Ferran Turné 11, Barcelona, Spain. 5th Biennial of Fine Art & Documentary Photography. (2018)
- Site: Brooklyn, Brooklyn, NY. Contemporary Photography 2008–2018. Curated by Kristen Gaylord, Beaumont & Nancy (2018)
- Newhall Curatorial Fellow in the Department of Photography at MoMA. (2018)
- Arena 1 Gallery, Santa Monica, CA. Every (single) Day. (2018)
- Museum of Contemporary Art of Georgia, Atlanta. Fast Forward / Rewind. (2017)
- Marcia Wood Gallery, Atlanta, GA. Unloaded. Curated by Dashboard. (2017)
- Artwork Network Gallery, Denver CO. Critical Mass Top 50 Show: Markers of Time. Curated by David Rosenberg. (2017)
- Work | Release, Norfolk, VA. Under the Gun. Ten photographs. (2016)

== Permanent collections ==
Floyd's work is held in the permanent collections of the following:

- Museum of Contemporary Photography
- High Museum of Art

== Awards and scholarships ==
List of awards and scholarships:

- 2018: Aaron Siskind Foundation Individual Photographer's Fellowship
- 2017: Cue Art Foundation Weathering Time exhibition September 7 – October 21, 2017
- 2017: Finalist, Aperture Portfolio Prize
- 2016: Cue Art Foundation Fellow: Selected for a solo exhibition at the CUE Art Foundation, New York, NY
- 2016: Recipient of the Atlanta Photography Group/ High Museum of Art Purchase Award
- 2015: SPE Future Focus Project Support Grant, Society for Photographic Education in Cleveland, OH.
- 2015: Artist-in-Residence, Jentel Artist Residency Program, Banner, WY
- 2015: Artist-in-Residence, Hambidge Center for Creative Arts and Sciences, Rabun Gap, GA
- 2014: John Gutmann Photography Fellowship Award, San Francisco, CA.
- 2002: Artist Project Grant from the City of Atlanta Bureau of Cultural Affairs
- Artist/writing residency at the Hambidge Center for Creative Arts and Sciences, Rabun Gap, GA; Light Work, Syracuse, NY; and The Joshua Tree Highlands Artist Residency, Joshua Tree, CA.
- ICP / GOST First Photo Book Award

== Book ==
She's Got a Gun, book length manuscript, 140 images, Temple University Press, 2008. The book includes a section on the history of American gun ladies. That is a visual book including 150 historical photographs of women with weapons, 35 of which were captured by Floyd, and a biography of Floyd's Texas background and the loss of her brother.

== Published work ==
- Featured in:
  - Showing: Pregnancy in the Workplace, 2019
  - Contact Sheet Journal
  - Game Face
  - Pregnant Pictures
  - Heart Shots
  - Gun Women
  - Real Knockouts
  - Bombensicher: Atomic Photographers Guild
  - A Different Kind of War: Vietnam in Art

== Interview ==
Lois Reitzes. “City Lights: Nancy Floyd.” WABE Atlanta. 24 November 2017.
