= Jerry Cooke =

Jerry Cooke may refer to:

- Jerry Cooke (mountaineer)
- Jerry Cooke (photographer)
