= Luminous-Lint =

Website on photography

- Website type: Online database on photography
- Available in: (in English)
- Website: www.luminous-lint.com
- Commercial: no
- Launched: December 5th, 2005
- Current status: Active

Luminous-Lint (or Luminous Lint) is a website on photography, run by Alan Griffiths, on vintage and contemporary photography. The site also serves as a collaborative knowledge base on the history of photography and as of 2023 included more than 126,000 photographs and 1,000 histories, biographies of more than 21,000 photographers, and information about techniques, galleries and dealers, photography timelines and other photography-related issues. Robert Hirsch has referred to it as a "top-notch" photographic site.

In 2022, Alasdair Forster described Luminous-Lint as a "dynamically networked, multiply indexed database in the form of a website that classifies photographs as multivalent entities capable of forming many different taxonomic relationships." Forster went on to say, "That more organic, responsive way of considering photographs within the wider history of the medium has proved both useful and effective, establishing this as the go-to site for academics, institutions, collectors, and devotees all over the world."

The site reproduces Photo Synthesis, a series of articles on individual works that Colin Westerbeck first contributed to the Los Angeles Times.
