= Bradley Smith (photographer) =

American magazine photographer, writer and photojournalist

Bradley Smith (June 30, 1910 – August 28, 1997) was an American magazine photographer, writer, photojournalist and a founder of the American Society of Magazine Photographers.

== Biography ==
Smith, born in 1910, in New Orleans, Louisiana, whose father was a railway telegraphist, commenced his working life killing armadillos and selling their hides. He began work as a photographer very early; after his family moved to Karnes City, at age 12, he began making portraits of the ranchers and cowboys who came to town to buy provisions.

Thereafter he was employed variously as a vacuum cleaner salesman, a waiter at the Galvez Hotel in Galveston, Texas, the advertising manager at Godchaux's Department Store in New Orleans, a magazine publisher in Hot Springs, Arkansas, and a soft-shoe dancer and did some farm labor organizing for the Farmer's Union and the Southern Tenant Farmer's Union, while photographing for several Southern newspapers; later he became nationally known for his freelance photographs of sharecroppers used for Roy Stryker's Farm Security Administration project. During the depths of the Depression, he migrated north with his sharecropper pictures and a few New Orleans pictures, and worked for several magazines in New York City, including writing for Women’s Wear Daily and for Men’s Wear; then in the 1940s obtaining writing positions with Look, a monthly column “Teens in the News” for Seventeen magazine and eventually becoming a photographer for Life magazine. Smith was rare in being both a writer and a photographer, and thus was amongst the early true photojournalists.

Smith also worked as a freelance photographer for several other publications, including Time, The Saturday Evening Post, Paris Match, Ladies Home Journal, American Heritage, Pic, Holiday and Vogue. For them he produced portraits and picture stories on Helen Keller, Mahatma Gandhi, Rodgers and Hammerstein, Harry S. Truman and his love of jazz resulted in portraits of Billie Holiday and Louis Armstrong, his best-known.

== Advocacy for the profession ==
As early as 1942 Smith, with fellow Click magazine photographer Ike Vern, as they were lunching with New York Post 'Photography' columnist and critic John Adam Knight (who was also chef 'Pierre de Rohan'), raised the need for magazine photographers to “have some sort of club or something”. Philippe Halsman, Ewing Krainin and Nelson Morris joined with them to complain that they were tired of being "underpaid, ripped off, and ignored" by magazine editors. Together, assisted by Smith's background as a union organiser, they formed the Society of Magazine Photographers to uphold photographers’ rights. The organisation was renamed the American Society of Magazine Photographers in 1946 (now the American Society of Media Photographers).

== Author/illustrator ==
In 1954, Smith became an author with his first book, Escape to the West Indies,' writing and illustrating a further 22 books covering a wide range of topics from erotica to wildlife to foreign countries.

In 1955 Edward Steichen selected his Depression-era photograph of a backwoods girl singing, surrounded by other children, for the world-touring Museum of Modern Art exhibition The Family of Man, seen by 9 million visitors.

== Later career ==
Smith met Jerry Cooke in 1944 and encouraged him to join the ASMP, and in 1969 together they founded the picture agency, 'Animals Animals', which still holds such images by Smith as Giraffe leaning over school bus (the agency was sold in the late 1970s and renamed 'Animals, Animals / Earth Scenes').

Smith died of throat cancer aged 87 on August 28, 1997, at a nursing home in La Jolla, California. He was survived by his partner, Mara Vivat, who was also an accomplished photographer, a sister, Evelyn Monroe, prominent Depression-era union activist of Laguna Beach, three sons, Steven, Terrence and Michael, a daughter, Sharon Hernandez Smith, two stepdaughters, Susan Van Kleek and Nancy Gilbert, and several grandchildren.

== Legacy ==
Smith's professional output is archived in the Bradley Smith Collection in paper records for the period 1962-1988 which document Smith's professional career through correspondence, research materials, book drafts, mockups, and photographs. It is held in the Online Archive of California (OAC)

== Books ==
- Smith, Bradley (1943), Japan : a history in art, New York
- Smith, Bradley (1957), Escape to the West Indies : a guidebook to the islands of the Caribbean ([1958 ed.] ed.), Alfred A. Knopf
- Smith, Bradley (1962), Columbus in the New World (1st ed.), Doubleday
- Smith, Bradley (1965), Spain: a history in art, Gemini Smith, ISBN 978-0-385-05016-6
- Smith, Bradley (1968), Mexico : a history in art, Doubleday, ISBN 978-0-385-03239-1
- Smith, Bradley (1968), The horse and the Blue Grass country (Rev. ed.), Doubleday
- Smith, Bradley; Miller, Henry, 1891-1980., (author of introduction.) (1970), Erotic art of the masters : the 18th, 19th & 20th centuries, Erotic Art Book Society, ISBN 978-0-8317-2953-0
- Smith, Bradley; Weng, Wango H. C, (joint author.) (1972), China: a history in art, Harper & Row, ISBN 978-0-06-013932-2
- Smith, Bradley (1972), The life of the giraffe, World Publishing, ISBN 978-0-529-04425-9
- Smith, Bradley (1972), The life of the hippopotamus, World Publishing, ISBN 978-0-529-04424-2
- Smith, Bradley (1972), The life of the elephant, World Publishing, ISBN 978-0-529-04535-5
- Smith, Bradley (1975), The USA, a history in art, Doubleday, ISBN 978-0-690-00966-8
- Smith, Bradley (1976), The new photography : a modern guidebook to better photography (1st ed.), Playboy Press, ISBN 978-0-87223-435-2
- Smith, Bradley; Stevens, Gus, (joint author.) (1978), The emergency book : you can save a life, Simon and Schuster, ISBN 978-0-671-24115-5
- Smith, Bradley (1978), The American way of sex : an informal illustrated history, Gemini Smith; New York : distributed by Two Continents Pub. Co, ISBN 978-0-8467-0567-3
- Robbins, Charles; Smith, Bradley, 1910-1997 (1979), Last of his kind : an informal portrait of Harry S. Truman (1st ed.), Morrow
- Smith, Bradley; Miller, Henry, 1891-1980 (1980), Twentieth century masters of erotic art (1st ed.), Fleetbooks, ISBN 978-0-517-54236-1
- Smith, Bradley; Müller, Dave J (1984), France, a history in art, Doubleday, ISBN 978-0-385-18211-9
- Smith, Bradley, 1910-; Longenecker, Martha; Mingei International Museum of World Folk Art; Gerald and Inez Grant Parker Foundation (1987), First collections : dolls and folk toys of the world, Mingei International Museum of World Folk Art, ISBN 978-0-914155-05-8
