= Lawrence Fried =

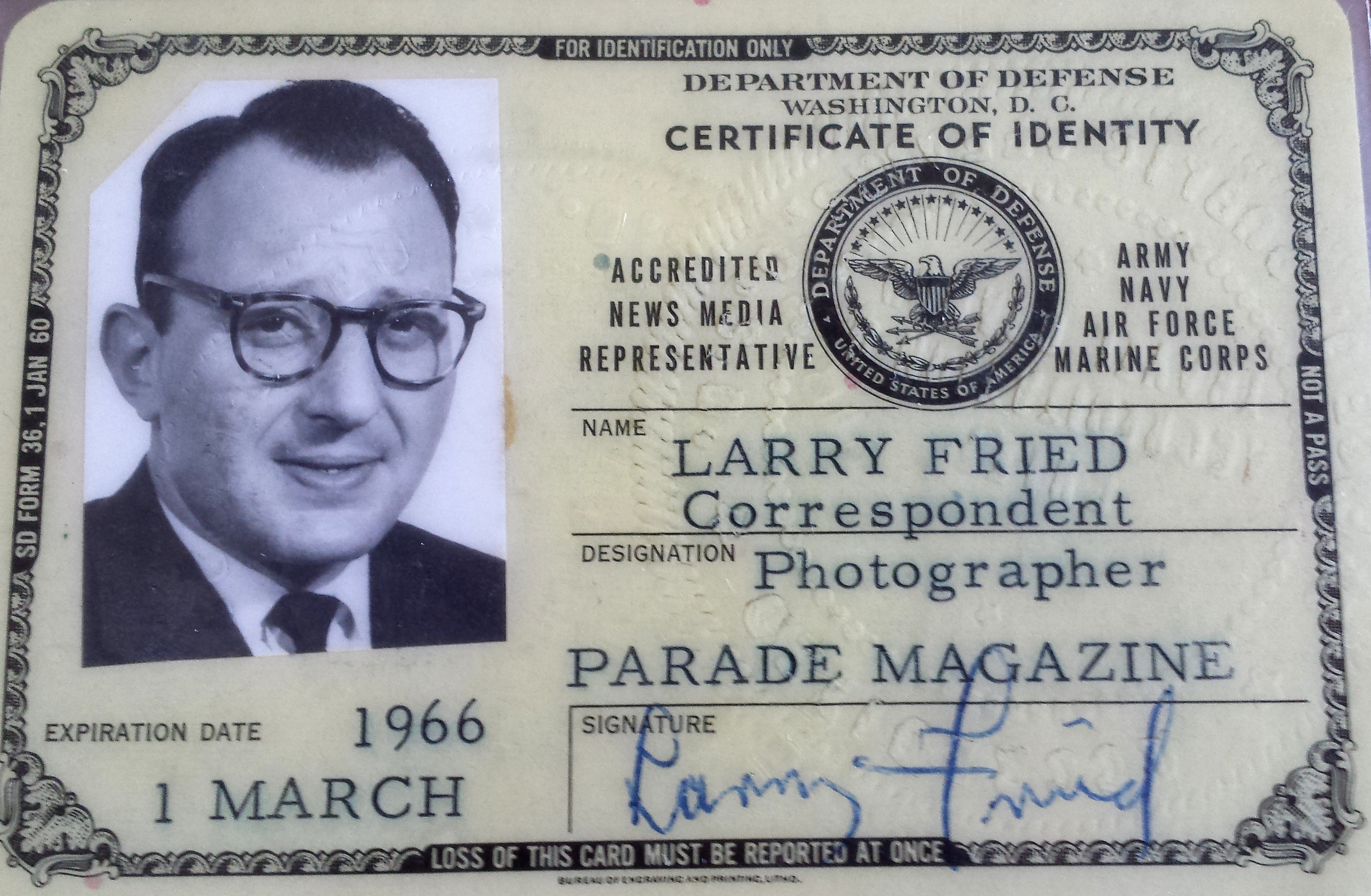
Lawrence Fried's press credentials

Lawrence Fried (June 28, 1926 – September 10, 1983) was an American photo-journalist. He was born to first-generation Jewish Hungarian and Russian parents in New York, N. Y. Fried's work appeared in Newsweek, The Saturday Evening Post, The New York Times, Vogue, Collier's, and Parade Magazine.[1] with over 70 covers for Newsweek [2]. He was the recipient of the Photographer of the Year award by the Overseas Press Club, the Outstanding Service to ASMP award and the Benjamin Franklin Award [3]. Recent publications include, "Always Audrey: Six Iconic Photographers, One Legendary Star," and "Paul Newman, Blue-Eyed Cool." His image of John F. Kennedy with his dog Charlie is currently on display at John F. Kennedy Library and Museum.

Fried learned photography while serving in World War II. After the war he attended the University of Miami, then moved to New York City. In the 1950s and early 1960s he worked through the PIX, Inc. alongside friends Cornell Capa, Ed Feingersh, George Karger, and Hans Knopf. There he began a 30-year career as a freelance photographer. He was a three-term president of the American Society of Magazine Photographers, a trade organization, and a founding partner of the Image Bank, which represents the work of 300 photographers.[5]

The people and subjects that he photographed on multiple occasions range from Vietnam [6] to world leaders such as Chiang Kai-shek [7]. His photograph of Robert F. Kennedy was chosen as the book cover of Kennedy's To Seek a Newer World [8]. While riding in the presidential motorcade covering Lyndon Johnson for the Saturday Evening Post [9] his car caught on fire and his leap—cameras flinging in the air—was captured on the front page of many major newspapers including The New York Daily News.[10]

He photographed musicians, actors, and visual artists throughout his career. Bette Midler [11], Stevie Wonder [12], Meryl Streep [13], Shirley MacLaine [14], Richard Serra [15], Joseph Kosuth [16], and Willem de Kooning [17], Audrey Hepburn.[19]

== ASMP ==
Fried was a three-term president of the American Society of Magazine Photographers from 1973 to 1978, a trade organization and was instrumental in the development of the first Business Practices book in 1973.[4].

== The Image Bank ==
In 1975, Fried co-founded The Image Bank, which became one of the largest agencies of its kind with franchises all over the world. TIB created a new model of selling stock photography that is followed to this day [18]. Getty Images bought the company in 2000.

== Death ==
Fried died of a heart attack on September 10, 1983, at his home in Tarrytown, New York. He was 57. He was survived by his wife, Nancy, and two daughters. [1]
