= Ka-Man Tse =

American photographer (b. 1981)

- Born: Kowloon, Hong Kong
- Education: Bard College; Yale University

Ka-Man Tse (born 1981) is a Hong Kong-born photographer, video artist, and educator based in New York. Influenced by her Asian-American and queer identity, Tse primarily uses portraiture to tell stories about the people, identity, visibility, and place in and around the queer community.

== Early life ==
Born in Kowloon, Hong Kong, Tse moved to the U.S. where she and her family worked in Schenectady, New York in Chinese restaurants. During the 1980s and 1990s, Tse made regular road trips to Chinatown, Manhattan which served as a surrogate for her birthplace. Her relationship with these three cities - New York City, Schenectady, and Hong Kong - is an ongoing investigation in her work.

== Education ==
In 2003 Tse received her B.A. in Photography from Bard College and in 2009 went on to receive an M.F.A. in Photography from Yale University.

== Art ==
Ka-Man Tse's work deals with visibility and representation through photography and film. She strives to locate points of intersection between LGBT and Asian and Pacific Islander communities. She mainly works with a large format view camera to take photographs that examine what is shared and negotiated between these two seemingly distant communities

=== Portraits and Narratives of LGBTQ Asians and Asian Americans ===
In 2014 she received the Robert Giard Fellowship grant for her project, Portraits and Narratives of LGBTQ Asians and Asian Americans. The artist describes this body of work as an examination of community and human agency through photographs, both staged and organic, of her subjects in public spaces. Tse mixes personal memories, obsessions, stories and portraiture in order to conceptualize queer narratives and photograph them while they unfold in public space.

=== Narrow Distances ===
Ka Man-Tse's solo show, Narrow Distances, featured a series of photographs taken in Hong-Kong, and aimed to rework the world out of a desire to see it re-imagined with the queer narrative in mind. Tse used placement, foregrounding and the connection with her subjects, to recast the social landscape of Hong-Kong. The title of the show is an allusion to the over-populated streets of the city as well as the space between Asian and LGBT communities. The show features intimate portraits of queer Chinese city-goers set against a backdrop of the Hong-Kong landscape. The subjects and setting work harmoniously together to create poetic images that confront issues of identity and representation. The show was held at Lumenvisum gallery in 2016 and was the artist's first solo exhibition in Hong Kong.

=== In Search of Miss Ruthless ===
Ka-Man Tse's photographs have been featured in the group show, In Search of Miss Ruthless, which examined the history of beauty pageants in Asia. Curated by Hera Chan and David Xu Borgonjon, the show was based on Canadian artist group, General Idea’s project titled, The 1971 Miss General Idea Pageant. In Search of Miss Ruthless, features two of Ka-Man Tse's photographs which were met with critical acclaim.

The first photo featured in the show is titled Embrace (2015), and features a group of Asian-Pacific Islander women locked in an emotional hug after the conclusion of a beauty pageant in New York. The women wear expressions ranging from joy to relief as they frantically cling to one another in an overtly emotional and extravagant embrace, speaking to the forced, enhanced smiles and personas of beauty pageant contestants.

The second photo included, Untitled, is a photograph of Rye Bautista, otherwise known as La Chiquitta, one of Hong-Kong's preeminent drag queens, alone on a rooftop in Hong-Kong. The subject is seen slumped on the ground, wig-less, barefoot and smoking a cigarette. His gaze looks off past the photographer and into the night sky. His heavily made up face starkly contrasts with the baldness of his head and the undone nonchalance in his posture. Here, Ka-Man Tse captures La Chiquitta behind the scenes, taking a break, bringing a sense of normalcy to the highly exaggerated persona drag queens adopt. Ka-Man Tse actively includes an Asian drag queen in a group show about beauty pageants, starting a conversations about similarities between the two worlds and contributing to her larger goal of increasing visibility of the LGBT community.

Tse has exhibited solo shows in the United States and Hong Kong.

== Teaching ==
Ka-Man Tse has taught photography at Cooper Union, The City College of New York, and at the Yale University School of Art. Tse is currently an Assistant Professor of Photography at Parsons School of Design.

== Selected exhibitions ==
- 2018: WMA Masters Exhibition, Transition, WYNG Foundation, Hong Kong
- 2018: Queering Space, Alfred University; Alfred, NY
- 2018: Aperture Portfolio Prize
- 2018: narrow distances, Eaton Workshop, Eaton Hotel HK
- 2017: In Search of Miss Ruthless, Para Site, Hong Kong
- 2017: A World Where We Belong, The Georgia Brooks LGBTQIA Exhibition, Hudson County Community College, Jersey City, NJ
- 2016: Narrow Distances, Lumenvisum, Kowloon, Hong Kong
- 2015 Expanded Geographies, Lianzhou Foto Festival, Guangzhou, China
- 2015 Personalities: Fantasy and Identity in Photography and New Media, Palm Springs Art Museum, Palm Springs, CA
- 2014: Our Portraits, Our Families, Museum of Chinese in America, New York, NY
- 2013: Bronx Calling: The Second AIM Biennial, The Bronx Museum of the Arts, Bronx, NY
- 2012: America Through a Chinese Lens, Museum of Chinese in America, New York, NY

== Selected awards and residencies ==
- 2019: Artist in Residence, Light Work, Syracuse, NY
- 2018: Aperture Portfolio Prize
- 2018: WMA Masters Finalist, WYNG Foundation, Hong Kong
- 2017: Yale University Fund for Lesbian and Gay Studies (FLAGS) Research Award, New Haven, CT
- 2015: Silver Eye Center for Photography Fellowship
- 2015: John Gutmann Photography Fellowship Nominee
- 2014: Robert Giard Foundation Fellowship
- 2013: Artist in the Marketplace Program, The Bronx Museum of the Arts
- 2012: Seniors Partnering with Artists Citywide Residency (SPARC), Queens Council of the Arts, Flushing, NY

== Publications and exhibition catalogues ==
- 2018: Aperture Magazine, Family, Issue 233
- 2018: Nueva Luz, The Queer Issue, Volume 22:2
- 2018: narrow distances, Candor Arts, IL
- 2018: Chinatown: Lens on the Lower East Side, Lower East Side Preservation Initiative, New York, NY (forthcoming)
- 2018: WMA Masters, Transition, WYNG Foundation, Hong Kong
- 2017: GR-09022017, Fotogalleriet, Oslo, Norway
- 2017: Papersafe Magazine
- 2016: NEWSPAPER, Vol. V, No. 1
- 2016: New Genealogies, Yale University School of Art, New Haven, CT
- 2014: Our Portraits, Our Families. New York: Asian Pride Project and the Museum of Chinese in America
- 2014: I am Here, The Oakland Asian Culture Center Zine, Inaugural issue
- 2013: Bronx Calling: The Second AIM Biennial. New York: The Bronx Museum of the Arts
- 2013: Capricious: Masculinity, Issue no. 14. Brooklyn, NY
- 2010: Daydream Nation, Philadelphia Photo Arts Center. Philadelphia: Philadelphia Photo Arts Center
- 2009: Yale MFA Photography. New Haven, Connecticut: Yale University Press
