= Ewing Krainin =

Ewing Krainin (June 17, 1912, New York–May 8, 2004, Kailua) was an American magazine, advertising and travel photographer active 1940s-1970s.

== Career ==
Ewing Krainin's career as a professional photographer commenced when his ‘bathing-girl’ photo of model Chili Williams appeared in Life magazine of October 18, 1943. The editors received nearly 200,000 requests for copies, motivating their hiring him for a cover picture and a three-page picture story “Bathing Suits: They have one along way but cannot go any further”, for their July 9, 1945 issue. He continued to be associated with ‘glamour’ photography, to the extent of it being a running joke amongst colleagues, before he diversified into travel stories, though even that he approached with humour; his book Happy holiday : a photographic travel guide, sort of was a send-up of travel brochures Novelist James Michener, wrote, "In the years when I crisscrossed the Pacific writing my books, I often came upon a jovial, extremely gifted, internationally famous photographer. Ewing Krainin, years younger than I, became a trusted friend, and a source for some great stories." Nevertheless, Krainin was represented in Edward Steichen’s 1955 world-touring Museum of Modern Art exhibition The Family of Man, by a fill-flash close-up of a wet-haired woman laughing after being doused by a wave.

In the 1960s Krainin was director of photography for Pan Am airlines.

== Contribution to his profession ==
Krainin was instrumental in the formation of the professional photographers’ association the Society of Magazine Photographers. On October 12, 1944, a couple of dozen photographers, including founding members Bradley Smith and Ike Vern gathered in Krainin's New York studio, where for lack of any other venue they continued to meet in their early years. They determined that a formal professional organisation was both wanted and needed. Bradley Smith recalls: “It was the year of 1944, a year of the beachheads of Normandy, the beginning of the end of World War II. It was also the year of the first meeting to organise photojournalists, a new breed of concerned visual communicators.”

== Personal life ==
Krainin married Bette (née Finley), a successful New York fashion model. They moved to Hawaii in the early 1960s and traveled the world for his photography while she also wrote articles for Vogue and Harper's Bazaar. In their retirement they established Shellworld, Hawaii.

Krainin died aged 91, on May 8, 2004, at home in Kailua, Hawaii, survived by his wife, daughter Cameron, and niece Marge Neuwirth.

== Book ==
Krainin, Ewing; Sutton, Horace (1950), Happy holiday : a photographic travel guide, sort of, Simon and Schuster

== Exhibitions ==
Ewing Krainin was included in the following group exhibitions at The Museum of Modern Art, New York:

- Photographs from the Museum Collection, November 26, 1958 – January 18, 1959
- The Family of Man, January 24–May 8, 1955
- The 28th Annual Exhibition of Advertising and Editorial Art of the New York Art Directors Club, March 15–April 17, 1949

== Collections ==
Family of Man Museum, Clervaux Castle, Luxembourg
