= Kris Graves =

American photographer (born 1982)

- Born: 1982 (age 43–44); New York City, U.S.
- Education: SUNY Purchase
- Website: krisgraves.com

Kris Graves (born 1982) is an American photographer who primarily works in portraiture and landscape photography. He is based in New York and London, and his work has been published and exhibited internationally. Graves's photographs evoke the sense of time, change, and memories as well as address social issues to raise awareness. Graves founded and directs Kris Graves Projects, a publisher of art books.

== Early life ==
Graves was born in 1982 in New York. He attended Purchase College, State University of New York, where he earned BFA in Visual Arts.

== Career ==
While working as a collections photographer at the Solomon R. Guggenheim Museum in New York, Graves continued his photographic endeavors. He also started an art and photography publishing house, Kris Graves Projects, which has become a platform for collaboration between the publisher and its artists. "On Death", published in 2019, was selected as "TIME'S Best Photobooks of 2019".

- A photographic project, Discovered Missing (2010–2013), is a culmination of Graves's photographs made in Iceland. He travelled to Iceland over the course of three years and photographed the country's landscapes, people, and their way of life.
- Testament Project (2014–2020) is a series of portraits depicting black Americans veiled in colored lightings. Subjects are given the freedom to choose the color of lighting by which their individuality is visualized and expressed. Testament Project challenges the stereotypes of black people that are deeply rooted in society and present opportunities for individuals to re-examine their preconceptions.
- Graves's series, A Bleak Reality (2016), consists of eight photographs that were taken during his eight days of travel across the United States. They depict the very places, including Ferguson and Staten Island, where eight black Americans were killed by police officers. Time when the photographs were taken corresponds, exactly or roughly, to the time of killings.
- In 2017, Graves was commissioned by Equal Justice Initiative (or EJI) and was included in its group exhibition, "The Legacy of Lynching: Confronting Racial Terror in America". The exhibition opened in July 2017 at the Brooklyn Museum in New York. The commission was part of EJI's "extensive research into the history of lynchings".

== Solo exhibitions ==
- 2024: Privileged Mediocrity: Memorialization in America, Rosedale Gallery, Arcadia University, USA
- 2020: The Testament Project, Austin Central Library, Texas, USA
- 2019: Testaments, Peddie School, New Jersey, USA
- 2017: The Testament Project, Joseph Gross Gallery, University of Arizona, Tucson, Arizona, USA
- 2017: The Testament Project, Art on Paper X Sasha Wolf Projects, New York, New York, USA
- 2016: The Testament Project, Bryn Mawr College, Pennsylvania, USA
- 2016: The Testament Project, The Center for Fine Art Photography, Fort Collins, Colorado, USA
- 2016: The Testament Project, NorteMaar, Brooklyn, New York, USA
- 2016: The Testament Project, Blue Sky Gallery, Portland, Oregon, USA
- 2013: Discovered Missing, Pocket Utopia, New York, USA
- 2012: Permanence, Pocket Utopia, New York, US

== 2-Person exhibitions ==
- 2011: Second Nature w/ Kared Rudd, Baang & Burne Contemporary, New York, USA
- 2010: A Queens Affair w/ Eric Hairabedian, Farmani Gallery, New York, USA

== Group exhibitions ==
- 2020: LOST Carmel, Center for Photographic Art, California, USA
- 2018: All Power: Visual Legacies of the Black Panther Party, Sarah Surgeon Gallery, Central Washington University, USA
- 2018: All Power: Visual Legacies of the Black Panther Party, Pacific Center Northwest, Seattle, Washington, USA
- 2018: Disruption, Center for Photography Woodstock, New York, USA
- 2018: Legacy of the Cool, Bakalar and Paine Galleries, Boston, Massachusetts, USA
- 2017: Three Minutes, En Foco / Hamilton Landmark Galleries, New York, USA
- 2017: The Legacy of Lynching: Confronting Racial Terror in America, Brooklyn Museum, New York, USA
- 2017: Summer Open, Aperture Gallery, New York, USA
- 2017: Unbound, Candela Gallery, Richmond, Virginia, USA
- 2017: Art.Now.2017, Hearst Galleries, New York, USA
- 2017: Future Isms, Glassbox Gallery, Seattle, Washington, USA
- 2019: Light Work Artist Residency, Syracuse NY
