= Terry Adkins =

American artist (1953–2014)

- Born: Terry Roger Adkins; May 9, 1953; Washington, D.C.
- Died: February 8, 2014 (aged 60); Brooklyn, New York
- Education: Fisk University (B.S.), Illinois State University (M.S.), University of Kentucky (M.F.A.)
- Known for: American artist, Professor of Fine Arts in the School of Design at the University of Pennsylvania
- Awards: 2009 Rome Prize; 2008 USA Fellows

Terry Roger Adkins (May 9, 1953 – February 8, 2014) was an American artist. He was Professor of Fine Arts in the School of Design at the University of Pennsylvania.

== Early life ==
Adkins was born in Washington, D.C., on May 9, 1953, into a musical household. His father, Robert H. Adkins, a chemistry and science teacher and Korean War veteran, sang and played the organ; his mother, Doris Jackson, a nurse, was an amateur clarinetist and pianist. Adkins' grandfather was the Rev. Andrew Adkins, pastor of the historic Alfred Street Baptist Church in Alexandria, Virginia. His aunt Alexandra Alexander was a mathematician and NSA code breaker. His uncle Dr. Rutherford Adkins, a former Tuskegee Airman with the 100th Fighter Squadron of the 332nd Fighter Group, flew 14 combat missions and eventually became Fisk University's 11th president.

As a young man, Adkins planned to be a musician, but in college he found himself drawn increasingly to visual art. Mentored by Aaron Douglas and Martin Puryear, he earned a B.S. in printmaking from Fisk University in Nashville, followed by an M.S. in the field from Illinois State University and an M.F.A. in sculpture from the University of Kentucky.

== Career ==
Adkins was an interdisciplinary artist whose practice included sculpture, performance, video, and photography. His artworks were often inspired by, dedicated to, or referred to musicians or musical instruments; specific installations and exhibitions were sometimes labeled "recitals." Sometimes, these arrangements of sculptures were "activated" in performances by Adkins' collaborative performance group, the Lone Wolf Recital Corps.

He led the Lone Wolf Recital Corps that premiering works at ICA London, Rote Fabrik, Zurich, New World Symphony, Miami, P.S.1 MOMA, and ICA Philadelphia.

Many of his works draw from the biographies of little known historical figures; his 2011 exhibition Nutjuitok (Polar Star) is based on the life of a black Arctic explorer named Matthew Henson who reached the North Pole with Robert Peary at the turn of the 20th century. In other cases, Adkins' works focus on obscure details in the lives of seminal figures such as the African American writer, activist and sociologist W.E.B. Du Bois, whose famous speech "Socialism and the American Negro" (1960) is invoked in the 2003–2008 installation Darkwater Record.

Adkins' work has been exhibited at museums and galleries worldwide, including the Whitney Museum of American Art in New York, and is in the collections of the Hirshhorn Museum and Sculpture Garden; the Studio Museum in Harlem; the Pérez Art Museum Miami, the Metropolitan Museum of Art and the Museum of Modern Art in New York; and the Tate Modern in London. In 2012 he had a major retrospective at the Frances Young Tang Teaching Museum and Art Gallery at Skidmore College in Saratoga Springs, N.Y. His work was also featured at P.S. 1 Contemporary Art Center (now MoMA PS1) in Queens, the LedisFlam Gallery in Brooklyn and elsewhere.

=== Exhibitions ===
Adkins had work in many exhibitions over the years. Early on, Adkins's art went international with work featured at Project Binz 39 in Zurich in 1986, and at Salama-Caro Gallery in London in 1987. In 1995 Adkins showed work at the Whitney Museum of American Art at Philip Morris in New York, and in 1997 at the International Gallery at the Smithsonian Institution in Washington, D.C. Adkins also had a show in 1999 at the Institute of Contemporary Art at University of Pennsylvania. In 2006 his work "Darkwater", a celebration of W.E.B. Dubois, was featured at Gallery 51 at Massachusetts College of Liberal Arts (MCLA) in the Berkshires. A short time later, Adkins was included in the 2008 NeoHooDoo: Art for a Forgotten Faith exhibition at MoMA PS1 in New York, which explored ritual and spirituality in art and was organized in collaboration with Houston's Menil Collection. Adkins went international again in 2009, displaying work in Gallery of the American Academy at American Academy in Rome, Italy.

In 2012 The Frances Young Tang Teaching Museum and Art Gallery (tang) at Skidmore College in New York hosted a retrospective of Adkins's work in a show called "Recital", including sculpture, video, and photography that honors a number of iconic historical figures and the lesser-known parts of their personal histories. The following year Adkins was featured in the 2013 exhibition Radical Presence: Black Performance in Contemporary Art at the Contemporary Arts Museum Houston.

His art was also included in the 2014 Whitney Biennial at the Whitney Museum in New York City, the same year his solo show "Nenuphar" opened at Salon 94 gallery. Next, at the 2015 Venice Biennale, a sculpture he created from found musical instruments was included in All The World's Futures, an exhibition curated by Okwui Enwezor that centered on social practice in art.

In 2021, the Frist Art Museum presented Terry Adkins: Our Sons and Daughters Ever on the Altar, an exhibition of Adkins' sculpture, prints and video works.

In 2023, Adkins' work was included in the exhibition and related catalogue of Spirit in the Land, a show looking into human interconnection with natural worlds and ecologies organized by the Nasher Museum of Art at Duke University, in Durham. The group exhibition traveled to the Pérez Art Museum Miami in 2024.

=== Works in Exhibitions ===
The art exhibition "Nenuphar," features various sculptures and mixed media artworks by Terry Adkins, held at the Salon 94 gallery, located in New York City, in 2014. This art exhibition was to showcase similarities between two very different men: Yves Klein, the French Nouveau Réaliste, and the American George Washington Carver, who was born a slave but went on to become a renowned agricultural chemist, inventor and educator, he also became a musician, painter and creator of dyes and pigments. This exhibition shows how Adkins's extensive historical research revealed loose connections related to botany, music and the nautical, but more importantly his linking of the two men resulted in some arresting works that sparked a satisfy-ing frisson (Ruble, 2014: 154–155). This subject matter of Adkins work helps us understand more of the thought process into his work.

"Meteor Stream" is an exhibition of work by Terry Adkins at the American Academy in Rome. The show as the culmination of a ten-year cycle on nineteenth-century abolitionist folk hero John Brown. In each of various locations across the United States connected with Brown's life, Adkins collaborated with members of the local community and merged newly discovered objects into the installations. The show amounted to a multilayers testimonial that compressed time and integrated historical events and otherworldly meanings. Adkins' sculpture "Last Trumpet" was prominently featured at the Museum of Modern Art's Artist’s Choice: Grace Wales Bonner's "Spirit Movers" exhibition in 2024. Ruby City has Bouquet, 2000, permanently on view.

=== Awards ===
- 2009 Rome Prize
- 2008 USA Fellows

== Death and legacy ==
Adkins died of heart failure in Brooklyn, New York, in February 2014; he was 60 years old. He was married to Merele Williams (Adkins) and had a son, Titus Hamilton Adkins, and a daughter, Turiya Hamlet Adkins.

At the University of Pennsylvania, Adkins was a teacher and mentor to numerous contemporary visual artists including Sandford Biggers, Demetrius Oliver, Nsenga Knight, Jamal Cyrus, and Jacolby Satterwhite. His work was memorialized by George Lewis in his work A Recital for Terry Adkins in 2016, performed by Ensemble Pamplemousse.
