= Richard Bruce Snodgrass =

American writer and photographer (born 1940)

- Born: April 22, 1940 (age 86); Beaver Falls, Pennsylvania, U.S.
- Occupations: Writer and photographer
- Spouses: Carol Lynn Barnett Snodgrass (m. 1967–1981) Mary Martha Beard Snodgrass (m. 1983)
- Website: https://richardsnodgrass.com

Richard Bruce Snodgrass (born April 22, 1940) is an American writer and photographer known for his evocations of life in small-town and rural western Pennsylvania. His published work includes fiction, nonfiction, and photography.

== Early life and education ==
Richard Bruce Snodgrass was born on April 22, 1940, in Beaver Falls, Pennsylvania, to Bruce DeWitt Snodgrass and Helen (née Murchie) Snodgrass. His parents were both United Presbyterians of Scottish descent, and both graduated from Tarkio College, in northwestern Missouri. His father was a founding partner of a prominent accounting firm in Pittsburgh, and his mother was trained as a teacher. Snodgrass's older brother, W. D. Snodgrass was a poet.

In addition to his brother, Snodgrass had two older siblings—sisters Shirley (1937–2016) and Barbara (1928–1955). Barbara's death, at the age of twenty-seven, from a coronary thrombosis aggravated by a chronic asthma-like condition is the subject of a series of poems by W. D. Snodgrass. The family lived in the College Hill neighborhood of Beaver Falls. The orange-brick house with distinctive rounded corners and curved windows is the subject of a collection of photographs Snodgrass took in the 1970s.

In 1959, Snodgrass enrolled in Saint Vincent College, then transferred to the University of Detroit and audited classes at Wayne State University. He then enrolled in the University of California at Berkeley, where he majored in English literature. He graduated with a BA in 1963.

Snodgrass subsequently studied with and assisted the renowned photographer Oliver Gagliani at his workshops in Virginia City, Nevada. He received his MFA in photography from the California College of Arts and Crafts in 1973.

== Career ==
=== Writing ===
Snodgrass's first novel, There’s Something in the Back Yard, was published by Viking in 1989. The book earned critical praise from the Washington Post Book World, the Christian Science Monitor, and the Los Angeles Times, among other publications. His short fiction has been published in the New England Review/Bread Loaf Quarterly, California Quarterly, Pittsburgh Quarterly, and elsewhere. His essay on Ross Macdonald appeared in South Dakota Review. As a fiction writer, he was artist in residence at the Helene Wurlitzer Foundation, in Taos, New Mexico. He also received a fellowship from the Pennsylvania Council on the Arts.

In 2011, Carnegie Mellon University Press published An Uncommon Field: The Flight 93 Temporary Memorial, a collection of photographs and meditations about the now-dismantled structure on the site that later became a national park in Shanksville, Pennsylvania. Skyhorse Publishing brought out Kitchen Things: An Album of Vintage Utensils and Farm-Kitchen Recipes in 2013. The New York Times called it a book “to admire,” and the Associated Press named it one of the year's “best books to get you thinking about food.” The book grew out of a series of articles Snodgrass wrote for Pittsburgh's Table magazine, where he was a regular contributor.

Snodgrass's series of novels and short stories, the Books of Furnass, set in a fictional mill town near Pittsburgh, Pennsylvania, were published between 2018 and 2022 by Calling Crow Press. The series includes, in order of suggested reading: All That Will Remain; Across the River; Holding On (short stories); A Book of Days; The Pattern Maker; Furrow and Slice: The Farmland Stories (short stories and photographs); The Building (Furnass Towers Trilogy, Bk 1); Some Rise (Furnass Towers Trilogy, Bk 2); All Fall Down (Furnass Towers Trilogy, Bk 3); Redding Up (short stories and photographs).

In 2022, Carnegie Mellon University Press published Snodgrass’ memoir, The House with Round Windows, about his brother, the poet W.D. Snodgrass, and the brothers’ relationship with their family and each other.

=== Photography ===
Snodgrass was artist in residence at the Syracuse University’s Light Work program in 1977. His photographs are in the Oakland Museum of California, where he served as special curator and printer for a Dorothea Lange exhibition. In 2006, an exhibition called AfterImage: Mill Life Remembered, consisting of eighty of his photographs and twenty accompanying text panels, was exhibited at the Heinz History Center, an affiliate of the Smithsonian Institution, in Pittsburgh. His photography has also appeared in LensWork magazine.

=== Bibliography ===
Fiction
Title	Publisher	Reference
There’s Something in the Back Yard (1989)	Viking	

The Books of Furnass
Title	Publisher	Reference
All That Will Remain (2021)	Calling Crow Press	
Across the River (2019)	Calling Crow Press	
Holding On (2019)	Calling Crow Press	
A Book of Days (2020)	Calling Crow Press	
The Pattern Maker (2020)	Calling Crow Press	
Furrow and Slice (2021)	Calling Crow Press	
The Building Furnass Towers Trilogy, Bk 1 (2018)	Calling Crow Press	
Some Rise Furnass Towers Trilogy, Bk 2 (2018)	Calling Crow Press	
All Fall Down Furnass Towers Trilogy, Bk 3 (2018)	Calling Crow Press	
Redding Up (2022)	Calling Crow Press	

Books of Photographs and Text
Title	Publisher	Reference
An Uncommon Field (2011)	Carnegie Mellon University Press	
Kitchen Things (2013)	Skyhorse Publishing	

Memoir
Title	Publisher	Reference
The House with Round Windows (2022)	Carnegie Mellon University Press	

Other Works
Title	Publisher	Reference
Back to Lovelock - Vol. 22 (Summer 1983), 59	California Quarterly	
Larry-Berry (1983)	New England Review/Bread Loaf Quarterly	
Down These Streets, I Mean, a Man Must Go - Vol. 24, no. 1 (Spring 1986), 7	South Dakota Review	
Down in the Greenwood O (1988)	New England Review/Bread Loaf Quarterly	
AfterImage: Mill Life Remembered (2006)	LensWork	
Brain Food (2006–2013)	Table	
From The House with Round Windows (2017)	Honeysuckle	
Tunnels of Love (2017)	Pittsburgh Quarterly	
