= Light Work =

Nonprofit arts organization in Syracuse, New York

Coordinates: 43.04033°N 76.146848°W

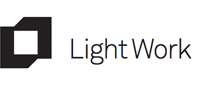
- Formation: 1973; 53 years ago
- Founder: Phil Block and Tom Bryan
- Type: Photography center
- Headquarters: Menschel Media Center; Syracuse University
- Location: 316 Waverly Avenue Syracuse, New York, 13244
- Director: Dan Boardman
- Website: www.lightwork.org

Light Work is a photography center in Syracuse, New York. The artist-run nonprofit supports photographers through a community-access digital lab facility, residencies, exhibitions, and publications.

== History ==
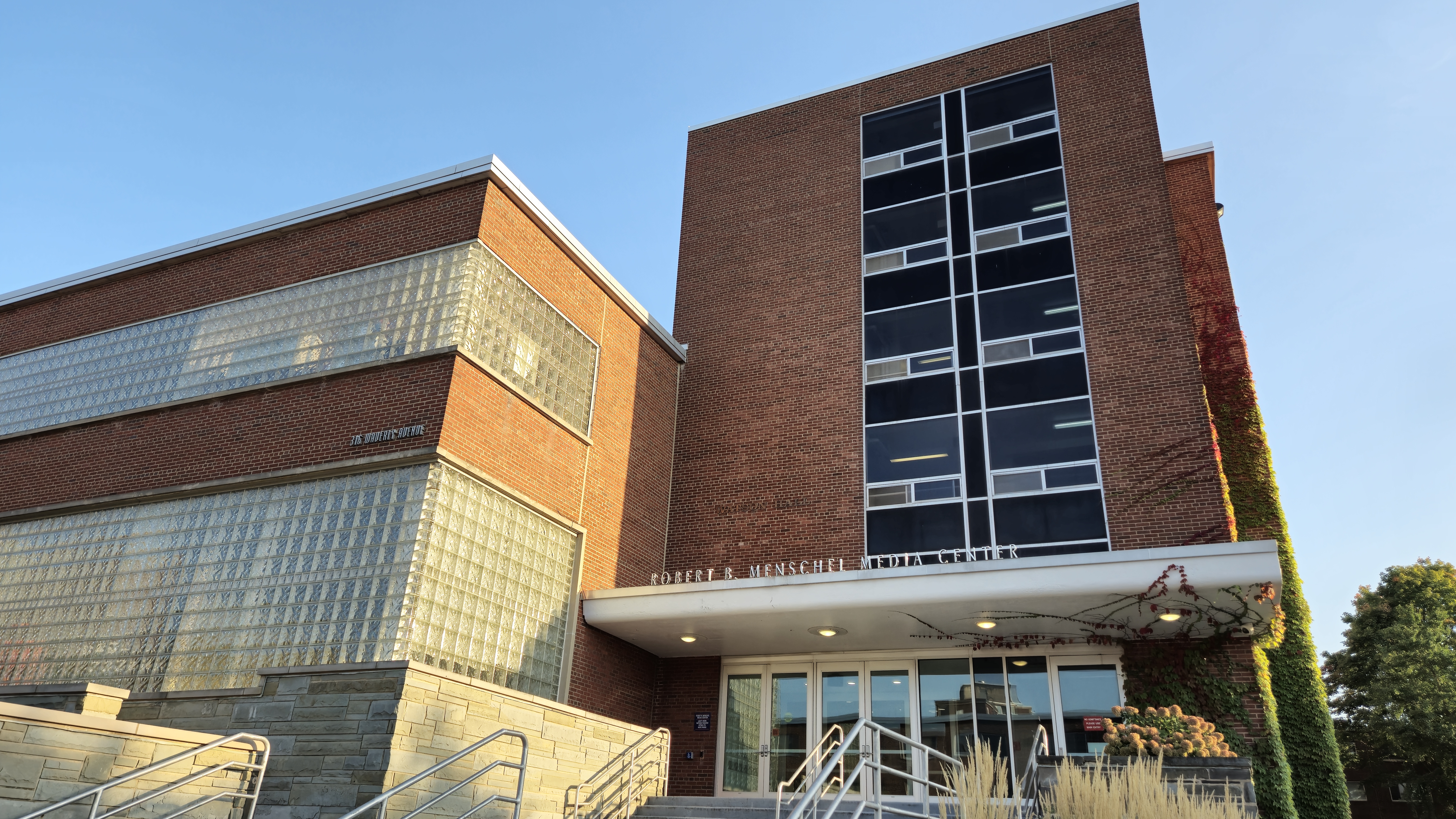
Menschel Media Center at Syracuse University.

The organization is housed at Syracuse University in the Robert B. Menschel Media Center. Founding directors Phil Block and Tom Bryan established it in 1973 and Jeffrey Hoone led Light Work from 1982 to 2021. Its programs are supported by National Endowment for the Arts; New York State Council on the Arts; Robert Menschel; Vital Projects Fund, Inc.; Syracuse University; Central New York Community Foundation; Joy of Giving Something, Inc., as well as by local subscribers.

Autograph ABP, the Community Folk Art Center, En Foco, the Everson Museum of Art, the Red House Art Center, the Urban Video Project (UVP), and others are collaborative partners of the center.

Jeffrey Hoone joined Light Work in 1980 and was assistant director from 1980-1982. He was director from 1982-2005, and executive director from 2005-2021. He retired from Light Work in 2021 and currently is the president of the Joy of Giving Something Foundation.

== Programs ==
=== Artists-in-residence program ===
The program, which began in 1976, annually invites a dozen or more artists to Syracuse to work on new projects. Residency includes a stipend, a furnished apartment, staff support, and access to its facilities. In 2018, the program had an acceptance rate of 1.3%. New work by artists-in-residence is published in a special edition of the center's magazine, Contact Sheet: The Light Work Annual, including an essay commissioned by Light Work. Work by former artists-in-residence is also part of the Light Work collection.

As of 2022, more than 500 artists from 16 different countries have participated in the program. Notable photographers who have participated in this Artists in Residence program include Christian Patterson, Amy Jenkins, Yijun Liao, Stuart Rome, Demetrius Oliver, Don Gregorio Antón, Ka-Man Tse, Robert J. Hirsch, Cindy Sherman, Anthony Hernandez, Pao Houa Her, Kris Graves, Carolyn Drake, Stuart Rome, Richard Bruce Snodgrass, and Nancy Floyd.

=== Light Work Lab ===
The Lab offers members technical assistance through a digital lab with DIY printing and scanning equipment, a digital service lab, private studios, black-and-white darkrooms, a lighting studio, and a library.

It also runs workshops and classes covering darkroom and technical foundations of photography to digital workflow and practical professional development.

=== Urban Video Project ===
The Urban Video Project (UVP) is a multi-media public art initiative of Light Work and Syracuse University with technology provided by Time Warner Cable. Its mission is to present exhibitions and projects that celebrate the arts and culture of Syracuse, where UVP operates one permanent exhibition site and one mobile projection unit along the city's Connective Corridor. UVP Everson projects an image near the size of an IMAX screen above the sculpture plaza of the Everson Museum of Art.

== Exhibitions ==
Since its inception Light Work has presented over 400 exhibitions. Four are curated annually in its Kathleen O. Ellis Gallery. Other venues include Light Work’s Hallway Gallery, the Community Darkrooms Gallery, and the Robert B. Menschel Photography Gallery. Light Work regularly collaborates with the Urban Video Project (UVP), the Everson Museum of Art, and other organizations and galleries in Syracuse. Satellite exhibitions are occasionally held at the Palitz Gallery at the Syracuse University Lubin House in New York City.

== Collection ==
The Light Work Collection holds over 4,000 photographs and art objects.

Artists-in-residence such as Cindy Sherman, John Gossage, Sunil Gupta, and others, are represented with early work that was made during the time of their Light Work residency.

== Publication ==
Contact Sheet covers the latest work by emerging and mid-career artists from around the world. Its five issues each year are designed and printed in the tradition of fine art photography monographs and are advertisement-free. Many important photographers have been included in the early stages of their careers, including Andres Serrano, Carrie Mae Weems, Hank Willis Thomas, and others.
