= Demetrius Oliver =

American artist and educator

Demetrius Oliver (born March 2, 1975) is an American artist and educator based in New York City. He is known for site-specific, multi-disciplinary installations using photography, sculpture, and video. Using common materials and found imagery, his work explores such themes as American transcendentalism, music, and cosmology.

== Early life ==
Oliver received his B.F.A. from the Rhode Island School of Design in Providence, Rhode Island in 1998. He received his M.F.A in 2004 from the University of Pennsylvania in Philadelphia, Pennsylvania where he was a student of Terry Adkins.

== Career ==
Oliver was an artist-in-residence at the Skowhegan School of Painting and Sculpture in Skowhegan, Maine in 2004; The Core Program in Houston, Texas from 2004 to 2006; and The Studio Museum in Harlem in New York City from 2006 to 2007; Light Work in 2009 where he brought with him boulder-sized anthracite that has recurred in his work.

His residency at Studio Museum in Harlem in 2007 culminated in a show called Midnight's Day Dream and in 2009 his work was included in an exhibition there called 30 Seconds Off an Inch curated by Naomi Beckwith that featured a work he made with a suitcase of coal and light called Asterism, evoking astronomy and fantasy.

In 2011 Oliver participated in an exhibition about the impact of the work by Bettye Saar. The show featured work she was influenced by as well as artists like Oliver, who was influenced by her metaphysical, found object work. Other artists featured alongside Oliver were David Hammons, Hank Willis Thomas, Radcliffe Bailey and Kiki Smith.

Oliver's work was shown for only one hour nightly during the run of Canicular at The Print Center in 2011, coinciding with the appearance of the dog star, Sirius. The show also featured manipulation of sound, heat and light, also evoking astronomy but literally using elements referring to canines, like a dog whistle, thus possibly corralling the star-gazing visitors into controlled environments like a pet and making the actual freedom of space unattainable. He used objects and photography to create this installation.

His exhibitions have included installations at the High Line in New York City, 2010, and Observatory at D'Amelio Terras in New York City, 2002. In 2015 Oliver created an installation Anemometer inspired by 300-year-old storms on Jupiter. That same year he showed a series called Eclipse at the Henry Art Gallery in Seattle at the University of Washington that depicted the top of his head being hit with a jet of steam and was paired with words by astronomers.

Oliver's work was included in a tribute show for Terry Adkins in 2016. Adkins and Oliver worked on a sound piece together called "Harmonic Spheres."

He currently teaches at Princeton University and is a part-time lecturer at The New School in New York City.
