= Bob Schwalberg =

Bob Schwalberg (October 12, 1927 – October 8, 1996) was an American photojournalist and writer on photographic technique and equipment.

== Career ==
Schwalberg was a photojournalist who worked for PIX Publishing, an early New York City photo agency which from 1935 to 1969 supplied news and feature photos to magazines, especially Life and, later, Sports Illustrated.

From 1950 he was a writer of technical stories in Popular Photography magazine and for many years produced a regular column for the magazine. He gained recognition as Mr. Leica, an expert on camera equipment, after working for nearly 7 years for the manufacturer of E.Leitz GmbH in Wetzlar in their public relations and product design departments, as well as serving as a European correspondent, before returning to write for Popular Photography.

== Recognition ==
Two of Schwalberg's photographs were included by curator Edward Steichen in the world-touring The Family of Man exhibition, seen by 9 million viewers. In one, two women spectators at a sports event, photographed at close range, scream ecstatically while the surrounding men remain unmoved. The second, taken from above with a slow shutter speed, captures a policeman at a slow shutter speed as he walked, showing only his dark uniform against a slightly blurred pavement, creating an abstract representation of law enforcement.

== Death and legacy ==
Schwalberg died a few days before his 69th birthday and was remembered at a memorial on March 4, 1997, at the Metropolitan Center, 123 West 18th Street, New York City.
