= Fagel Collection =

Dutch historical collection and archive

The Fagel Collection is a collection assembled by the Fagel family, a prominent political family in the Dutch Republic during the Early Modern Period, which now resides at the Library of Trinity College Dublin. Comprising 30,000 printed books, as well as manuscripts, maps, and other engraved materials, making it one of the most prolific collections in Europe. Topics covered include domestic and international history and politics, natural history, geography, literature, and theology. Materials within the collection come from many different countries and are in multiple languages, most commonly Dutch, French, and English.

Related collections are housed at the National Archives of the Netherlands in The Hague.

== History ==
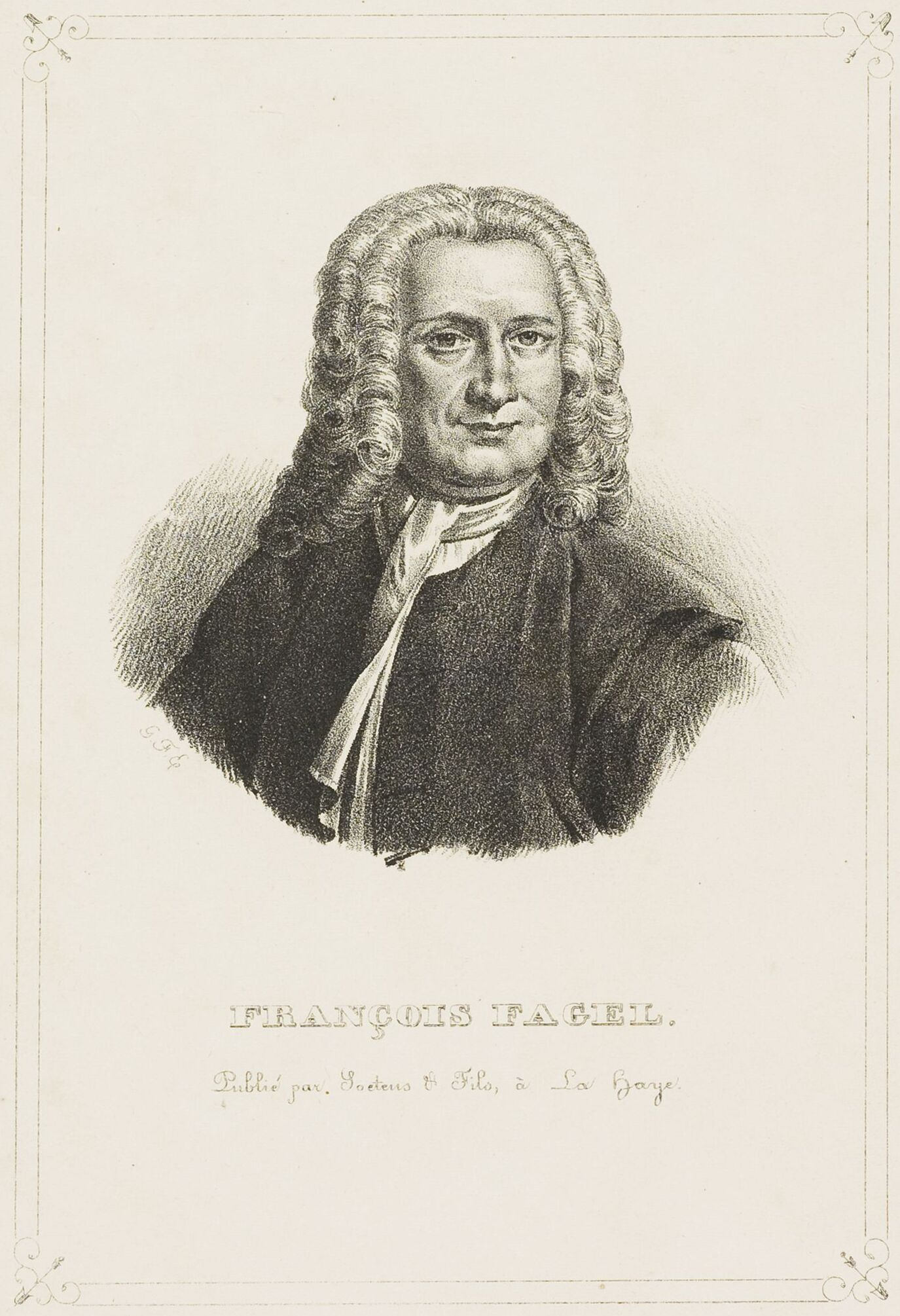
Portrait of François Fagel the Elder (1659–1746)

In 1680, Hendrik Fagel the Eldest (1617–1690) bought the real estate for what would become the Fagel family's dwelling and home of their enormous library on the prestigious street of Noordeinde in The Hague. François Fagel the Elder (1659–1746) kept his collections, not only print material but also coins and graphic arts, in the gallery leading to a pavilion now known as the Fagel Dome.

The collecting spanned generations, with François the Elder and Hendrik Fagel the Elder (1706–1790) contributing especially to the library. After the death of Hendrik the Elder, his grandson, Hendrik Fagel the Younger (1765–1838), inherited the library. Hendrik the Younger was abroad when, in 1795, French forces invaded the Dutch Republic and he was dismissed from his post as Greffier of the Dutch States General. Financial constraints resulting from his expulsion prompted Hendrik the Younger to transport his family's library to London where he proceeded to sell it.

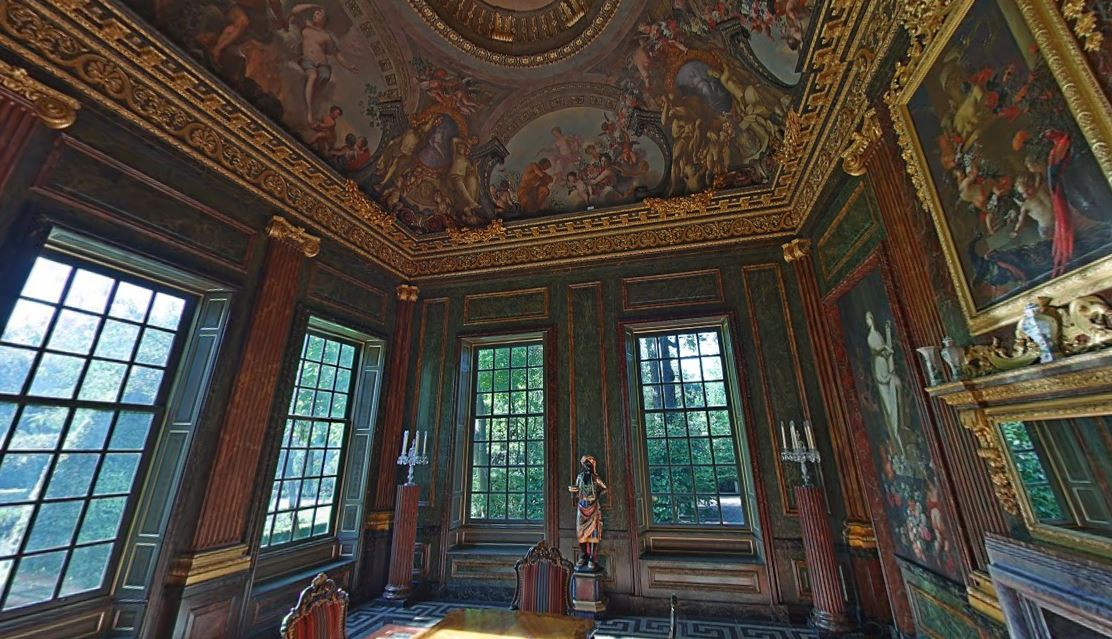
The Fagel Dome, 2024

== Acquisition by Trinity College Dublin ==
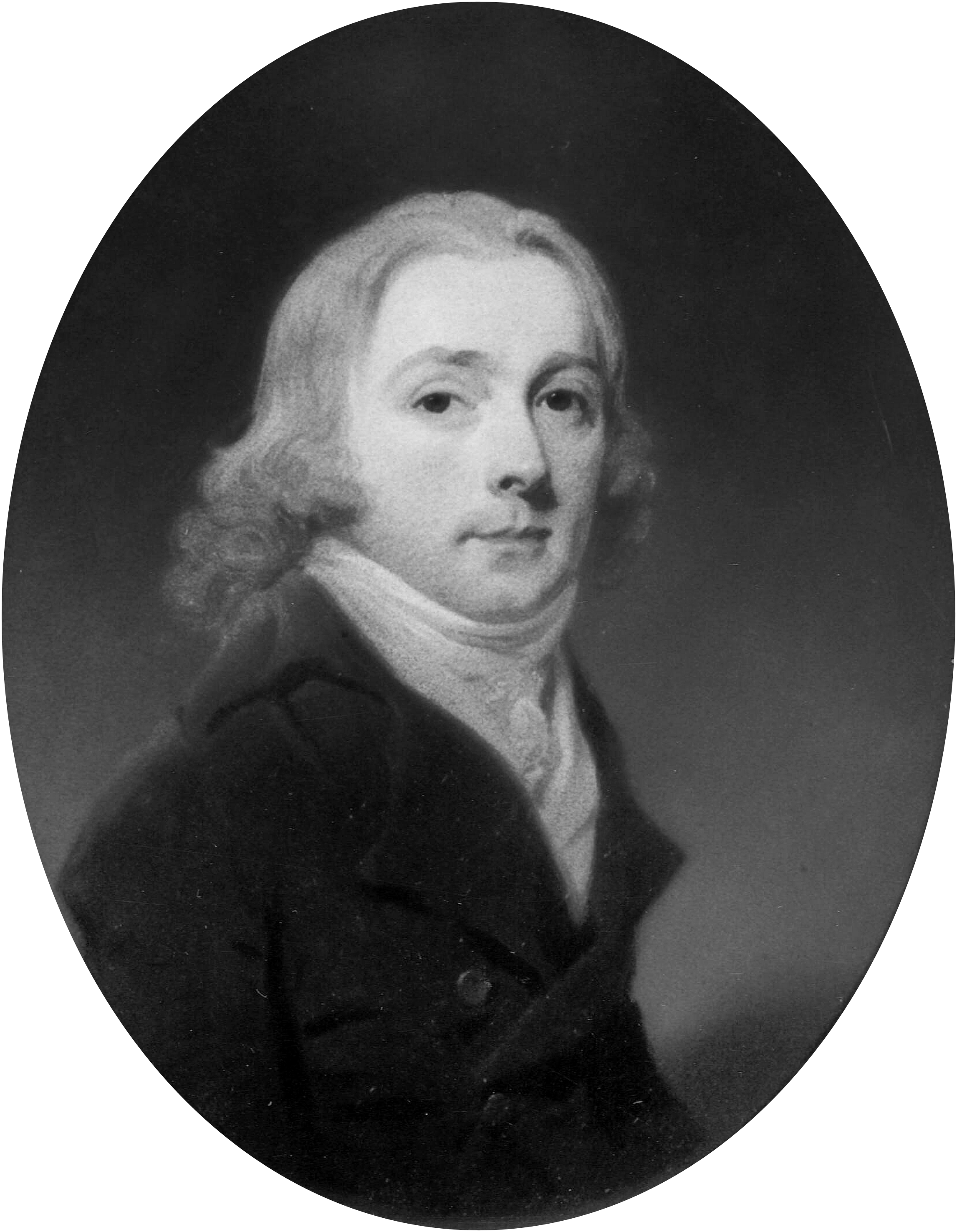
Portrait of Hendrik Fagel the Younger (1765–1838)

Hendrik Fagel the Younger originally intended to sell his vast family collection at auction and commissioned a catalogue for this purpose. The sale was to be held at Christie's auction house, but it never took place. With funding from the Erasmus Smith Trust, the books, manuscripts, and maps that now make up the Fagel Collection were bought for the Library of Trinity College Dublin for £8,000. The carefully packed collection arrived in Dublin in May 1802, where it bolstered the library's capacity by 40 percent. As a new room had to be built and older collections rearranged to accommodate the bulk of the addition, the Fagel library, as it was locally known, at Trinity College Dublin was opened on 1 March 1809.

== Contents ==
=== Print ===
The majority of Trinity College Dublin's Fagel Collection is made up of printed works and it originally functioned as a working or reference library for the Fagel family while they served, successively, as greffiers.

Trinity's Fagel Collection holds the Trinity College Plutarch, a two volume edition of Greek philosopher Plutarch's assemblage of biographies, Parallel Lives. This edition was printed in Latin on fine parchment and set in Roman type by Nicolaus Jenson, illuminated by the Master of the London Pliny in Venice, Italy during the Renaissance, around 1478.

The collection also contains thirty-six plays published by Thomas Johnson in The Hague between 1718 and 1726.

=== Manuscripts ===
The Fagel Collection includes manuscript material, the most well-known being the journal of Simon van der Stel from his travels to Namaqualand in the 1680s.

Another celebrated work in the collection is The Fagel Missal, created by the convent of Saint Agnes in Delft around 1460, remarkable for its elaborate decoration. The name 'Margaret' is written on the Missal, suggesting that it was authored by a woman, a rare thing to be documented during the period of the Missal's creation as many female writers and illustrators remained anonymous.

A lesser known manuscript is an album of tulip illustrations drawn between 1637 and 1641, significant because it is estimated to be one of fifty surviving manuscripts of its kind: tulip books, a product of pre-1637 Dutch 'tulipmania'.

As the family home on Noordeinde underwent several architectural and design changes over the generations, the Trinity collection includes construction drawings for the Fagel home. The collection also contains an album of eighteenth-century architectural drawings of buildings in Saint Petersburg, including a plan for the Smolny Convent. This album is notable as it is one of only four of its kind found outside of Russia.

=== Maps ===
The collection contains a significant number and impressive quality of single-sheet maps that make up the Fagel Atlas. One important map is John Oligby's 1676 Large and accurate map of the city of London, an 'ichnographic map' made up of 20 sheets, rare due to its pristine condition compared to the few other surviving copies.

=== Archives ===
The National Archive of the Netherlands holds the private and administrative papers of Gaspar Fagel, Hendrik Fagel the Eldest, François Fagel the Elder, Hendrik Fagel the Elder, and Hendrik Fagel the Younger.

== Contemporary relevance ==
The Fagel collection is admired not only for its expanse but for its diversity of material, used for contemporary, interdisciplinary research across history, geography, art history, and other intersecting fields. The Fagel collections' significance across multiple countries has led to international cultural cooperation, sharing, and learning, such as in the Unlocking the Fagel Collection project jointly undertaken by the Library of Trinity College Dublin and the Royal Library of the Netherlands since 2020. One discovery from this project was that 2,000 items in the Fagel Collection are the only known surviving copies of their kind, making them very rare.
