= Stuart Rome =

American photographer

Stuart Rome (born 1953 in Bridgeport, Connecticut) is an American artist photographer and professor of photography at Drexel University in Philadelphia, Pennsylvania. He studied under John Pfahl while receiving his BFA from the Rochester Institute of Technology. Stuart Rome also received an MFA from Arizona State University.

Rome's early work was color photography and focused substantially on third-world cultures and anthropology. With more recent work, Rome has turned his attention to black and white landscape photography, pursuing specifically the spiritual relationships between human cultures and the landscape. His work has been collected by the Center for Creative Photography, Tucson, AZ; The Museum of Fine Arts, Houston, TX; the George Eastman House, Rochester, NY; the Los Angeles County Museum of Art, Los Angeles, CA; the Philadelphia Museum of Art, Philadelphia, PA; the Princeton University Art Museum, Princeton, NJ; and the San Francisco Museum of Modern Art, San, Francisco, CA.

Rome currently lives and works in Philadelphia, Pennsylvania.

== Monograph ==
- Forest, Nazraeli Press, 2005

"Signs and Wonders" southeast museum of photography in 2010

●

It was displayed in the art exhibition, "This is not an old Fall Out Boy song" in 2020

== Grants ==
- John Simon Guggenheim fellowship award. 2015
- Pennsylvania Council on the Arts Grant in 1999
- Artist in Residence, Manchester Craftsmen's Guild, Pittsburgh, PA in 1998
- Artist in Residence, Blue Mountain Center, Blue Mountain Lake, NY in 1997
- Visiting Artist and Juror for the National Photo Competition, The Magic Silver Show in 1997
- Pennsylvania Council on the Arts Grant in 1992
- Research Scholar Award, Drexel University in 1989
- Materials Support Grant, Eastman Kodak in 1987
- Materials Grant Award, The Polaroid Corporation in 1983
- Artist in Residence, Syracuse University, Light Work Program, Syracuse, NY in 1978
