= Amy Jenkins (artist) =

- Born: 1966 (age 59–60)
- Education: Colorado College, School of Visual Arts, New York
- Known for: Multimedia, Video, Photography
- Website: amyjenkins.net

Amy Jenkins (born 1966) is an American artist from Peterborough, New Hampshire who is recognized for her work in video installation and experimental film.

== Early life and education ==
Jenkins was born in Springfield, Illinois. She earned her BA degree in Fine Art at Colorado College in 1988 with a Minor in Italian and Cinema Studies. In 1990, she obtained an MFA in Photography and Related Media from the School of Visual Arts, New York.

== Work ==
Jenkins is best known for her multidisciplinary installations that combine video, audio, sculpture, and performance to create immersive environments. Familial relationships, home, sexuality, and the male/female identity are the recurrent themes of her intimate, visceral, and often personal, narratives. Jenkins was one of the initial artists in the early 1990s to use video sculpture to create intimate artworks that belie their technology. In her investigations of female identity, miniature objects have played a vital role in Jenkins' videos and multimedia installations. In her video installation Ebb (1996), Jenkins projects an image of a female bathing in red water—suggesting blood—onto a tiny claw-foot tub on the top of a ceramic-tiled pedestal. As the video progresses, the water in the tub gradually becomes clear, creating the surprisingly realistic illusion that the blood is unnaturally seeping back into her body—a reversal of the menstrual cycle.

Jenkins' short experimental films, such as "Audrey Samsara,"(2005) "Audrey Superhero" (2010) and "Becoming" (2013) feature the artist's children. Personal narrative, gender identity and the parent-child relationship are themes that continue in her oeuvre. Jenkins' initial documentary feature, titled "Instructions on Parting" (2018) was screened at various festivals, including the Museum of Modern Art's Doc Fortnight, the Montclair Film Festival, the Independent Film Festival Boston, the Sydney Film Festival, and DOXA. Jenkins' more recent short film, "Wishes," premiered at the Camden International Film Festival in 2019 and was exhibited at several other festivals, including Salem, Ashland Independent, Frameline, OutfestLA, Sidewalk, NewFest, and New Orleans, among others.

Jenkins has exhibited internationally. She has had solo shows at: Athens Institute for Contemporary Art, GA; the Brattleboro Museum and Art Center, VT; Sioux City Art Center, IA, and John Michael Kohler Arts Center, WI. Her museum group exhibitions include: Stop. Look. Listen, Herbert F. Johnson Museum of Art, Ithaca, NY; Mixed Emotions, Haifa Museum of Art, Haifa, Israel; Video Art/Video Culture, The National Gallery of Art, Washington, DC; Aquaria, Oberösterreichisches Landesmuseum, Linz, Austria; New Video Artists, Cheekwood Botanical Garden and Museum of Art, Nashville, TN; Video Jam, Palm Beach ICA, FL; Threshold, Virginia Museum of Contemporary Art, VA; Current Undercurrent: Working in Brooklyn, the Brooklyn Museum of Art, NY.

== Grants and awards ==
Jenkins' work has been funded by grants from: New Hampshire State Council for the Arts, New York State Council for the Arts, New York Foundation for the Arts, Pollock-Krasner Foundation, Jerome Foundation, the Experimental Television Center, the Berkshire Taconic A.R.T. Fellowship, and Aaron Siskind Foundation. Her residencies include: Harvestworks Media Artist-in-Residence in NY; an NEA-sponsored Fellowship & residency at Virginia Center for the Creative Arts, VA, and residencies at MacDowell Colony, NH; Yaddo, Saratoga, NY; Djerassi, CA and Light Work, Syracuse, NY. In 2022-23, Jenkins served as a Harvard Film Study Center - Flaherty Fellow.

=== Awards ===
- 2018 Best Feature Documentary award for "Instructions on Parting," Athens International Film and Video Festival
- 2018 Filmmaker of the Year, New Hampshire Film Festival
- 2019 Ewing Award for Interdisciplinary Art

Jenkins has also been nominated twice for the CalArts Alpert Award in Film/Video.

== Collections ==
Her work is included in the public collections of:

- Herbert F. Johnson Museum of Art, Ithaca, NY
- Akron Art Museum Akron, OH
- Wake Forest University#Arts, Wake Forest, NC
- Light Work, Syracuse, NY
