= John Gutmann =

German-American photographer and painter

- Born: 1905; Breslau, German Empire (now Poland)
- Died: June 12, 1998; San Francisco, United States
- Resting place: San Francisco
- Education: Breslau and Berlin, with Otto Mueller
- Known for: Painting, Photography
- Movement: American realism
- Spouse: Gerrie von Pribosic

John Gutmann (1905 – June 12, 1998) was a German-born American photographer and painter.

== Early life and education ==
Gutmann was born in 1905 in Breslau, Germany (now Wrocław, Poland) to an upper-middle-class Jewish family. He earned a degree in art from Staatliche Akademie für Kunst und Kunstgewerbe Breslau and moved to Berlin in 1927, earning a post-graduate degree at Preussisches Shulkollegium for Hohere Erziehung.

== Career ==
Berlin was the greatest city in the world when I lived there - in the late 1920s, early 1930s. It was the most sophisticated, the most decadent city, and it attracted the most powerful assembly of creative talents in the world. The greatest theater, movies, art. Everyone was there ...

[San Francisco was] very refreshing to me. I had had enough of art with a capital A, culture with a capital K. It was liberating to come to a place so backward in art and aesthetics.

— John Gutmann, 1989 San Francisco Examiner profile

Being Jewish, he was unable to exhibit his paintings or get a job teaching in Nazi Germany, and so he emigrated to the United States, arriving in San Francisco in late 1933. Gutmann reinvented himself as a photographer before he left Germany, purchasing a Rolleiflex and signing a photojournalism contract with Presse-Photo in 1933. He continued to work as a photojournalist for Presse-Photo from the West Coast until he signed on with PIX in 1936, an agency he worked with until 1962.

After arriving in San Francisco, one of the first news stories he documented was the 1934 West Coast waterfront strike. His work on other stories was later published in popular contemporary newsmagazines such as Time, Look, and The Saturday Evening Post. Some of his photographs of the Golden Gate International Exposition were published in Life in 1939. At the same time, he started teaching at San Francisco State College in 1936 and founded the photography department there in 1946.

In between, Gutmann served with the United States Office of War Information during World War II.

Gutmann taught at SF State until 1973. While working there, he founded the creative photography program using the Bauhaus model. After his retirement, he began printing images from his archives, and began exhibiting his work at the Fraenkel Gallery and Castelli Graphics in the late 1970s. His work was later packaged into a traveling exhibition, "Beyond the Document", which moved from SFMOMA to the Museum of Modern Art and Los Angeles County Museum of Art starting in 1989.

== Style ==
Gutmann's main subject matter was the American way of life, especially the Jazz music scene. Gutmann is recognized for his unique "worm's-eye view" camera angle.

I photographed the popular culture of the United States differently from American photographers. I saw the enormous vitality of the country. I didn't see it as suffering. The urban photographers here took pictures that showed the negative side of the Depression, but my pictures show the almost bizarre, exotic qualities of the country. ... I was seeing America with an outsider's eyes - the automobiles, the speed, the freedom, the graffiti ...

— John Gutmann, 1989 San Francisco Examiner profile

He enjoyed taking photos of ordinary things and making them seem special. Kenneth Baker, art critic for the San Francisco Chronicle, wrote in 1997 that Gutmann was "an emissary of European modernism" who "brought a distinct angle of vision to the American scene" and his images demonstrated his "excitement of his witness to the [Depression-era] times". David Bonetti, art critic for the San Francisco Examiner, called Gutmann's output from the 1930s "his best–when, a young Jewish refugee, he experienced America as a bemused stranger in a strange land. Gutmann fell in love with Depression-era America, which he traveled by Greyhound Bus Line. He saw its cars, its rites and festival, its athletes, its women, its vibrant African American communities and its dynamic street life with European eyes."

== Awards ==
Gutmann received a Guggenheim Fellowship in 1977.

== Legacy ==
He created the John Gutmann Photography Fellowship Award, through the San Francisco Foundation.

The full archive of Gutmann's work is located at the Center for Creative Photography (CCP) at the University of Arizona in Tucson, which also manages the copyright of his work.

In his obituary, SFGate remembered him as a "leading photojournalist of the Depression era, a painter and an art instructor at San Francisco State University." His wife Gerry, who was also a painter, died before he did. Guttmann requested at his death that no service be held and that instead memorial donations be collected to benefit the John Guttmann fund (which is managed by the San Francisco Foundation).

== Collections (selected) ==
Gutmann's work is held in the following permanent public collections:

- Addison Gallery of American Art, Andover, Massachusetts
- Art Institute of Chicago
- Cantor Arts Center, Stanford University
- Cleveland Museum of Art, Ohio
- Figge Art Museum, Davenport, Iowa
- Fotomuseum Winterthur, Switzerland
- Metropolitan Museum of Art, New York City
- Museum of Fine Arts, Boston
- Rijksmuseum Amsterdam
- San Diego Museum of Art
- San Francisco Museum of Modern Art

== Exhibitions (selected) ==
- 1941: Wondrous World, Young Memorial Museum, San Francisco.
- 1941: Image of Freedom, The Museum of Modern Art, New York.
- 1947: The Face of the Orient, Young Memorial Museum, San Francisco.
- 1974: John Gutmann, Light Gallery, New York.
- 1976: as i saw it, San Francisco Museum of Modern Art.
- 1985: Gutmann, Art Gallery of Ontario, Toronto.
- 1990: Talking Pictures, 1934-1989, Fahey/Klein Gallery, Los Angeles.
- 1998: John Gutmann, Rastlosese Amerika der 30er Jahre, Fotomuseum Winterthur, Switzerland.
- 2000: John Gutmann: Photographer/Collector, Fine Arts Museums of San Francisco.
- 2025: John Gutmann & Max Yavno: California Photographers, San Diego Museum of Art, San Diego.

== Monographs (selected) ==
- Gutmann, John; Kozloff, Max (May 1984). The Restless Decade: John Gutmann's Photographs of the Thirties. Harry N. Abrams. ISBN 978-0810916586.
- Gutmann, John; Phillips, Sandra S. (March 2000). Culture Shock: The Photography of John Gutmann. London, England: Merrell. ISBN 978-1858940977.
- Gutmann, John; Stein, Sally (22 September 2009). John Gutmann: The Photographer at Work. New Haven: Yale University Press. ISBN 978-0300123319.
