= Spaarnestad Photo =

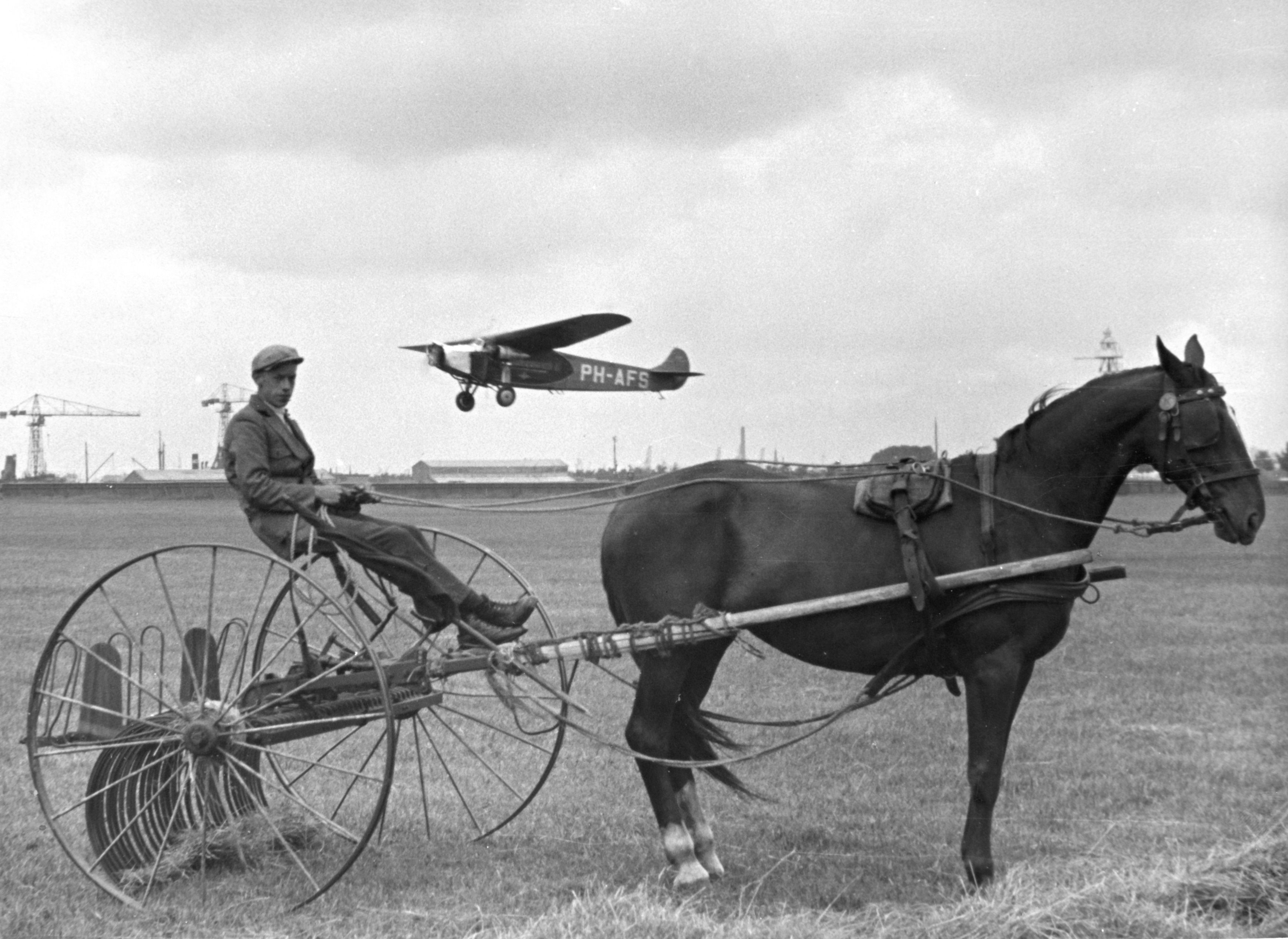
Early airplane in the Netherlands (1934); foto Spaarnestad Archief

Spaarnestad Photo was an independent institution formerly located on the Nassaulaan in Haarlem, in the Netherlands, whose goal is to preserve around 13 million photos. It was founded in 1985. In 2008, the photographic archives of Spaarnestad Photo were moved to the Nationaal Archief in The Hague. The Spaarnestad Photo archives worked with the Nationaal Archief and Wikipedia to make its archives partly available with Creative Commons licenses. Well over 10,000 photographs from Spaarnestad were placed on Wikimedia Commons between 2010 and 2017.

== Ceasing operations ==
As of April 2024 Spaarnestad Photo ceased operations. Spaaarnestad closed its image bank. The continuation of activities was no longer possible because income had declined significantly. The foundation's physical photo archive had already been housed at the National Archives since 2010 and remained available there.

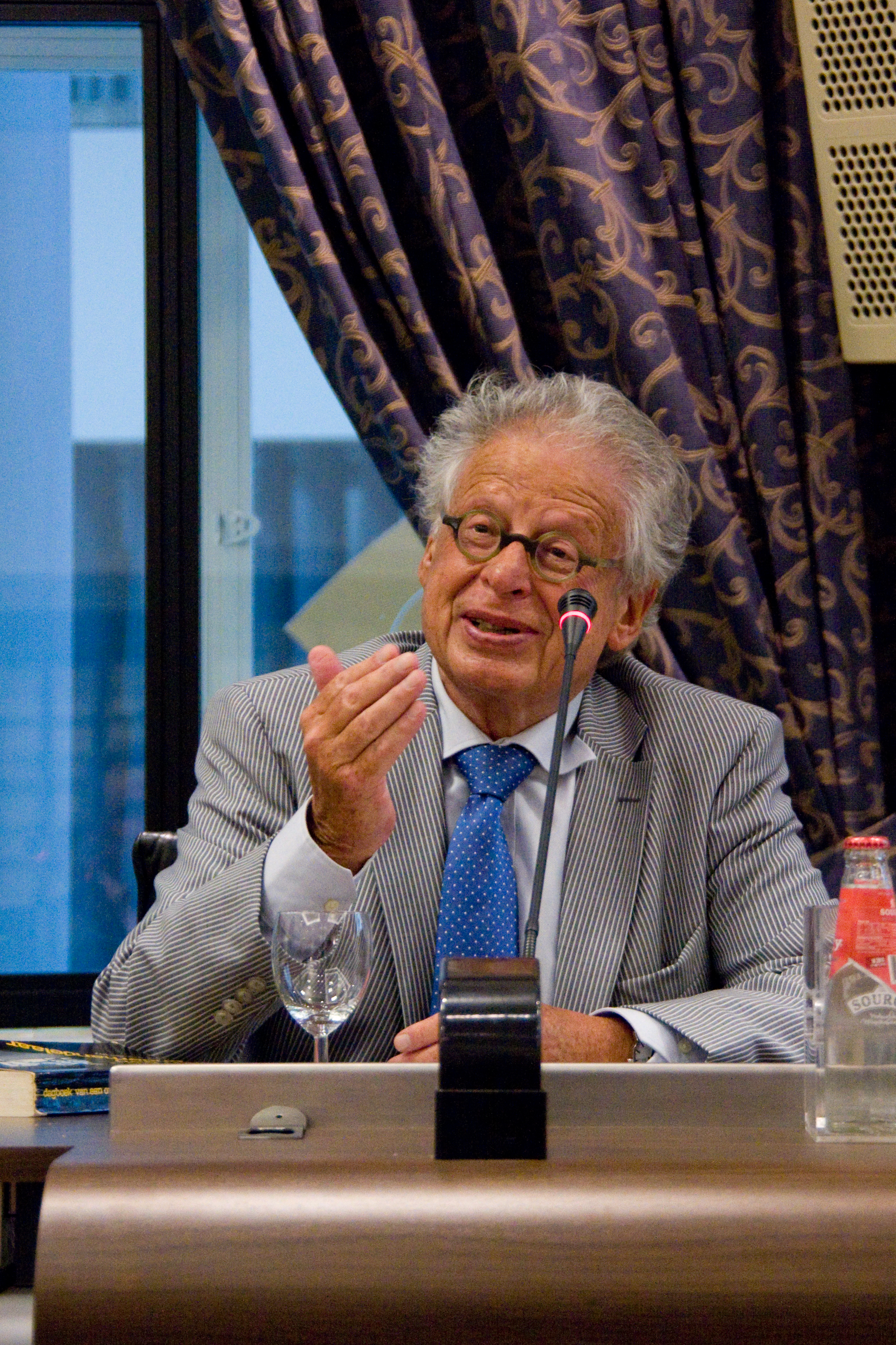
Ed van Thijn speaking in 2010 on the occasion of the release of Government photos to the public domain

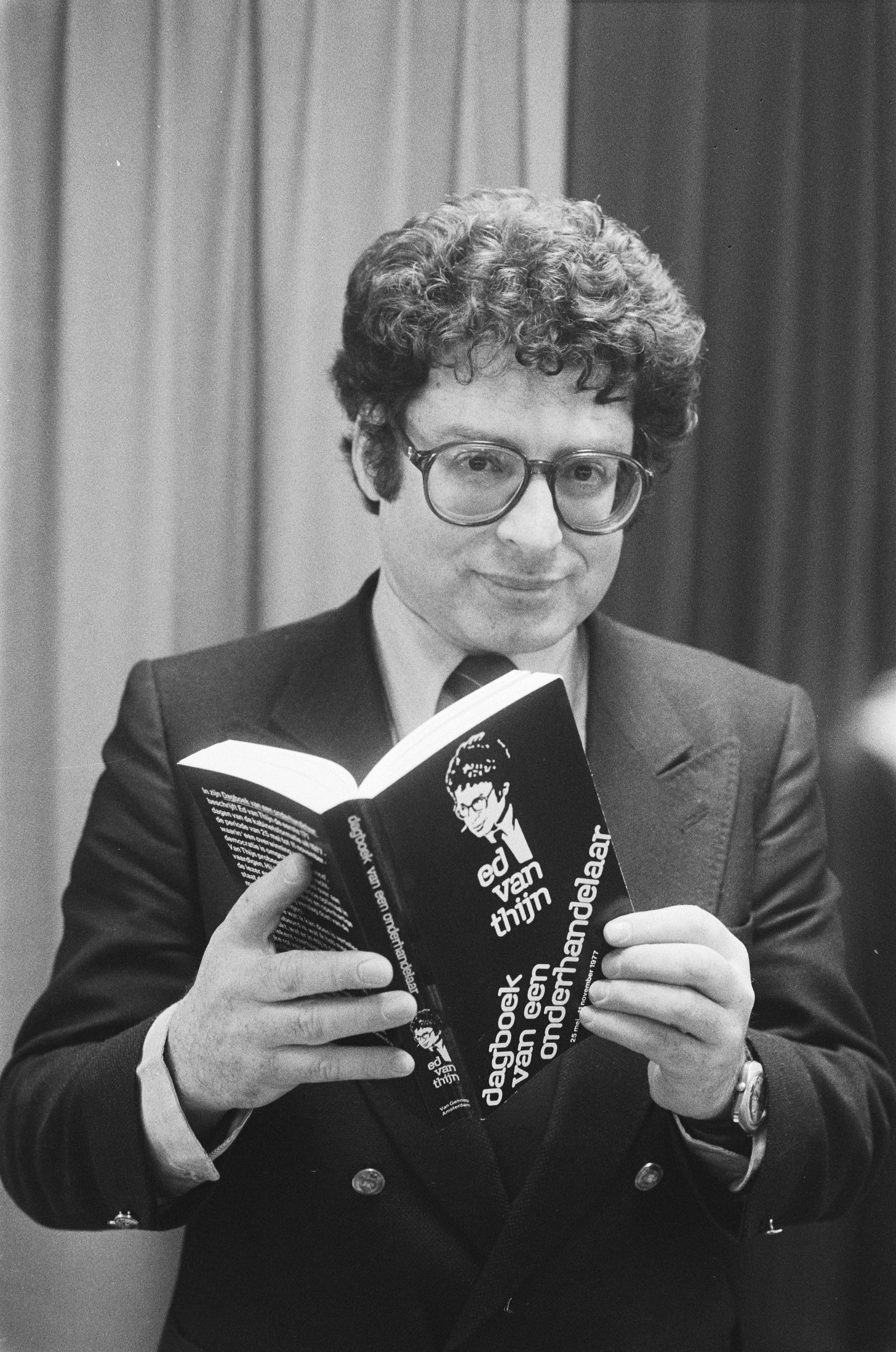
Ed van Thijn in 1978, on the presentation of his own book "Diary of a Negotiator", one of the released photos
