= To Seek a Newer World =

1967 book by Robert F. Kennedy

- Title page for To Seek a Newer World (1967)
- Author: Robert F. Kennedy
- Language: English
- Genre: Non-fiction
- Publisher: Bantam Books
- Publication date: 1967
- Publication place: United States

To Seek a Newer World is a 1967 book written by Robert F. Kennedy, in which he outlines his analysis on issues such as the war in Vietnam, nuclear power, welfare, and other issues. In response to the publication, New York Times critic Eliot Fremont-Smith stated, "To Seek a Newer World is addressed essentially-and in this reviewer's opinion, thoughtfully and constructively-to the double crisis of conscience and confidence which may be the common root of most of the major issues that now confront us". The book also was praised by the Christian Science Monitor.
