= Pittsburgh Quarterly =

- Cover of the Winter 2011 issue
- Frequency: Quarterly
- Circulation: 40,000 (2009)
- Founded: 2006
- Country: United States
- Based in: Pittsburgh
- Language: English
- Website: www.pittsburghquarterly.com

Pittsburgh Quarterly is a commerce and culture magazine in Western Pennsylvania, published four times per year with more than 30 distinctive stories every quarter. Topics range from regional indicators, timely issues in Greater Pittsburgh, book reviews and cultural stories to leader profiles, sports and outdoors.

The magazine was founded in 2006 by Douglas Heuck, a former investigative reporter and business editor at The Pittsburgh Press and Pittsburgh Post-Gazette.

Every year since its inception, Pittsburgh Quarterly has been judged to be Western Pennsylvania's best magazine by the Golden Quill Awards, sponsored by the Press Club of Western Pennsylvania. for outstanding journalism. In 2014, 2015 and 2018 the magazine won a Folio Eddie Award.
