= Eileen Darby =

American photographer

Eileen Darby Lester (née Darby; May 12, 1916 – March 30, 2004) was an American photographer of Broadway theatre productions.

== Life and work ==
Darby was born in Portland, Oregon on May 12, 1916. She studied biology at Marylhurst University near Portland, but left at age 20 to pursue photography in Manhattan. She got a job working in the darkroom at Pix from 1937, then from 1939 started photographing for the agency, which sent her on theatrical assignments. Darby subsequently founded her own agency, Graphic House, in 1941. She photographed more than 500 Broadway theatre shows. Her photographic credits used her maiden name.

She died in Long Beach, New York on March 30, 2004.

== Publications ==
- Stars on Stage: Eileen Darby and Broadway's Golden Age: Photographs 1940–1964. New York City: Bulfinch, 2005. Photographs by Darby, compiled and with text by Mary C. Henderson. With an introduction by John Lahr. ISBN 9780821228975.
