= Robert J. Hirsch =

American artist (born 1949)

Robert J. Hirsch (born 1949) is an American artist, curator, educator, historian, and author. He is best known for his writing about color and digital imaging and about the history of photography, and as an advocate for photographers who offer a haptic, expressionist interpretation of their subject matter.

== Biography and career ==
Born in Ann Arbor, Michigan, in 1949, Hirsch has a BFA from Rochester Institute of Technology (1971) and an MFA from Arizona State University (1974). He is a former executive director and chief curator of CEPA Gallery in Buffalo; a founder of Southern Light Gallery; and a co-founder of Northlight Gallery, and has curated numerous exhibitions and public art projects. Previously, he was a professor of photography at Amarillo College, SUNY Buffalo, and SUNY Brockport, where he was also the director of graduate studies in the visual arts and associate director of the Visual Studies Workshop. Since 2000, he has led Light Research, a Buffalo-based consulting firm that provides professional services in the photographic arts field.

Hirsch's work has been shown in over 200 solo and group exhibitions in North America and Europe, including at the Albright–Knox Art Gallery in Buffalo, New York; the Burchfield Penney Art Center in Buffalo; the Noorderlicht Photofestival in Groningen, the Netherlands; and the Stefan Stux Gallery in New York City. During the past decade, Hirsch's visual projects—such as World in a Jar: War & Trauma; Manifest Destiny & the American West; Unseen Terror: A Culture of Fear; The Sixties Cubed; and Ghosts: French Holocaust Children—have explored the interrelationship of historical images with memory and time. Hirsch has rephotographed and recontextualized images into three-dimensional installations in order to investigate ethnic violence, genocide, religious intolerance, and war.

In December 2019 - January 2020, Hirsch presented his new visual project "Mugs: Anthropometric Portraits and The Blurring of Social Identity" at the Indigo Art Gallery (Buffalo), which is said to "address the intersections of self-awareness with visual rituals, technological change, and justice in our digitally mediated world".

== Writings ==
Hirsch's books include Transformational Imaging: Handmade Photography Since 1960; Exploring Color Photography: From Film to Pixels; Photographic Possibilities: The Expressive Use of Equipment, Ideas, Materials, and Processes; Seizing the Light: A Social & Aesthetic History of Photography; and Light and Lens: Photography in the Digital Age. Light and Lens has been published in Chinese- and German-language editions. His work, both visual and written, is signed as Robert Hirsch.

Hirsch has published scores of articles about visual culture and interviewed numerous eminent photographers and curators. He has been the associate editor of Photovision and Digital Camera (UK), and a contributing writer for Afterimage, CEPA Journal, Light Work's Contact Sheet, Digital Camera, Exposure, The Encyclopedia of 19th-Century Photography, The Focal Encyclopedia of Photography, Fotophile, The Handmade Photograph, History of Photography, Photo Ed (Canada), The Photo Review, Photovision, Photo Technique, World Book Encyclopedia, and numerous regional publications, including Buffalo Spree and FY.

== Critique ==
The photography journal Afterimage stated, "Robert Hirsch clearly pitches Light and Lens: Photography in the Digital Age as an introductory college-level photography textbook that is foremost an idea book rather than a software or camera manual. In line with this philosophy, Hirsch ensures that critical seeing and aesthetic values are amply addressed alongside the technical. Thus, chapters on the history of photography, visual foundations, and symbolism lead off the book, and he closes with thoughtful chapters concerning seeing with a camera and thinking and writing about images. This emphasis is a refreshing and stimulating approach for a photographic textbook.

Of World in a Jar, Richard Huntington, an art critic at The Buffalo News, wrote: “In the jar installation, even with its staggering array of images, no image has prominence. That's because Hirsch levels the cultural playing field. Whether he's dealing with a Nazi atrocity, some appalling medical procedure, Frankenstein or Bart Simpson, he gives every image visual parity. But—and this is key—it is done with no cynicism, no black irony, no post-mod reductionism. He lays out these images as equals to jolt the mind into emotional attention. In Hirsch's hands the mixing of the trivial and the serious, the accidental and horrifyingly deliberate, make it seem that every piece is part and parcel of some overarching human drama larger than the sum of these parts.”

Of an earlier work, The Architecture of Landscape, Jeffrey Hoone, executive director of Light Work, wrote: “Hirsch gives the viewer a variety of issues, concerns, and techniques to think about and digest. He massages meaning out of every nuance in the series from the choice of subject to the scale of the images, and each decision that he has made seems to open up opportunities for further investigation.”

Of Hirsch's recent exhibition The Sixties Cubed, critic and artist Bruce Adams wrote: “At the core of this work—and perhaps of all Hirsch’s art in recent memory—is [Brion] Gysin's cut-up technique, which utilizes the element of chance in its random rearrangement of sentence fragments." Hirsch, Adams wrote, created "a free-flowing account of a decade as seen through the images it produced, resulting in fragmented nonlinear multiple narratives. Hirsch sees this as a metaphor for 'how we live in a world of assembled fragments that unfold over time.' Of course, each time the work is mounted it results in a different random arrangement presumably evoking a multitude of spontaneous associations."
