= Nationaal Archief =

National archives of the Netherlands

National Archives of the Netherlands
- Nationaal Archief

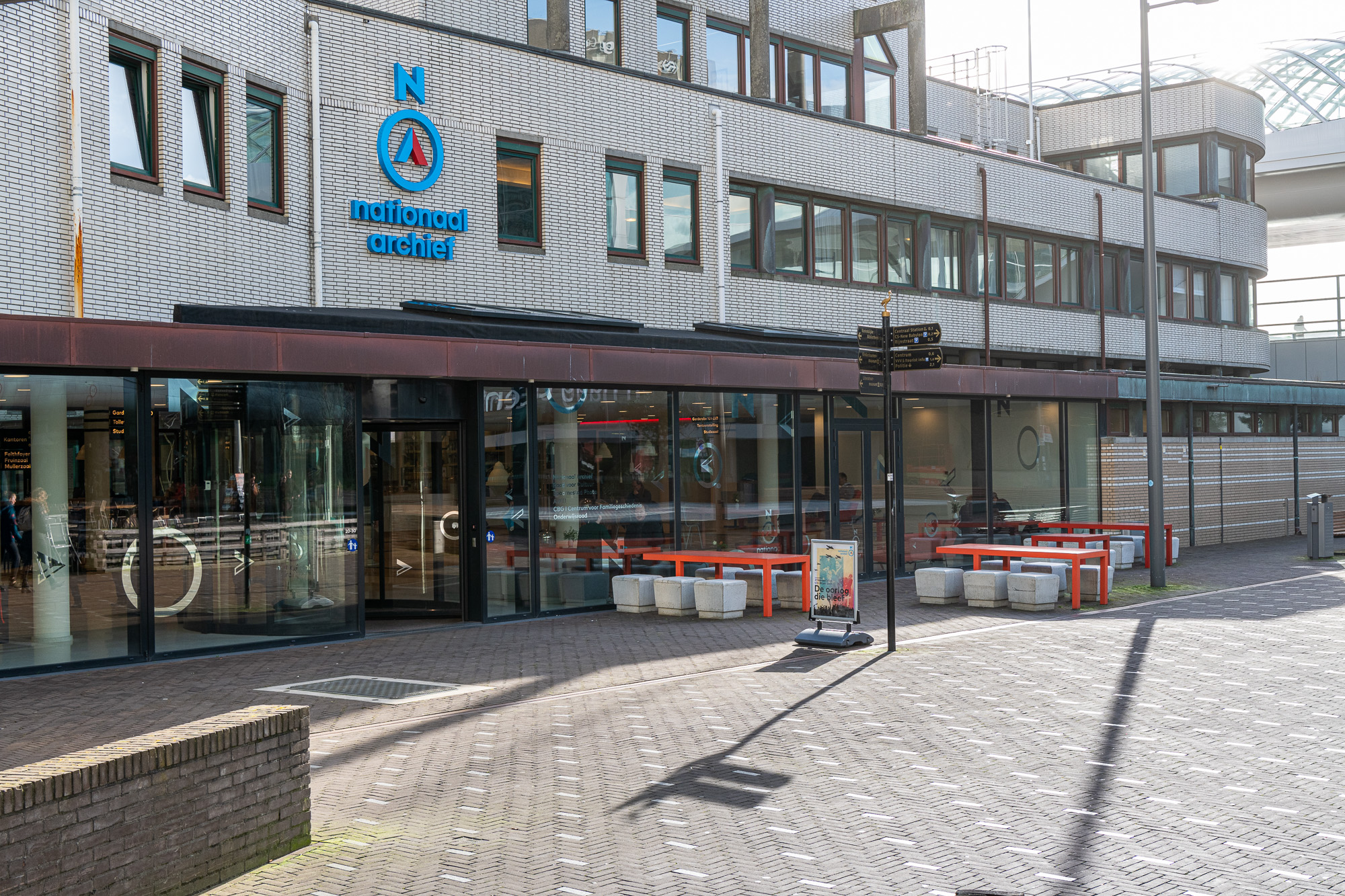
- Main entrance of Nationaal Archief

Agency overview
- Formed: 1802; 224 years ago
- Headquarters: Prins Willem-Alexanderhof 20, The Hague (2595 BE); 52°04′52″N 4°19′35″E
- Website: nationaalarchief.nl, gahetna.nl

The Nationaal Archief (NA) is the national archives of the Netherlands, located in The Hague. It houses collections for the central government, the province of South Holland, and the former County of Holland. There is also material from private institutions and individuals with an association to the Dutch government or the political or social history of the Netherlands. The Nationaal Archief holds the Archives of the Dutch East India Company from 1602 to 1811, which were, along with related records held by South Africa, India, Sri Lanka and Indonesia, inscribed on UNESCO's Memory of the World International Register in 2003 in recognition of their historical value. In 2008, the photographic archives of Spaarnestad Photo were included in the Nationaal Archief. It was announced in 2010 that many photos from these archives would be shared with Wikipedia. The Nationaal Archief also holds material related to The Fagel Collection.

The Netherlands Antilles had a separate Nationaal Archief, which was dissolved when the dissolution of the Netherlands Antilles took place.

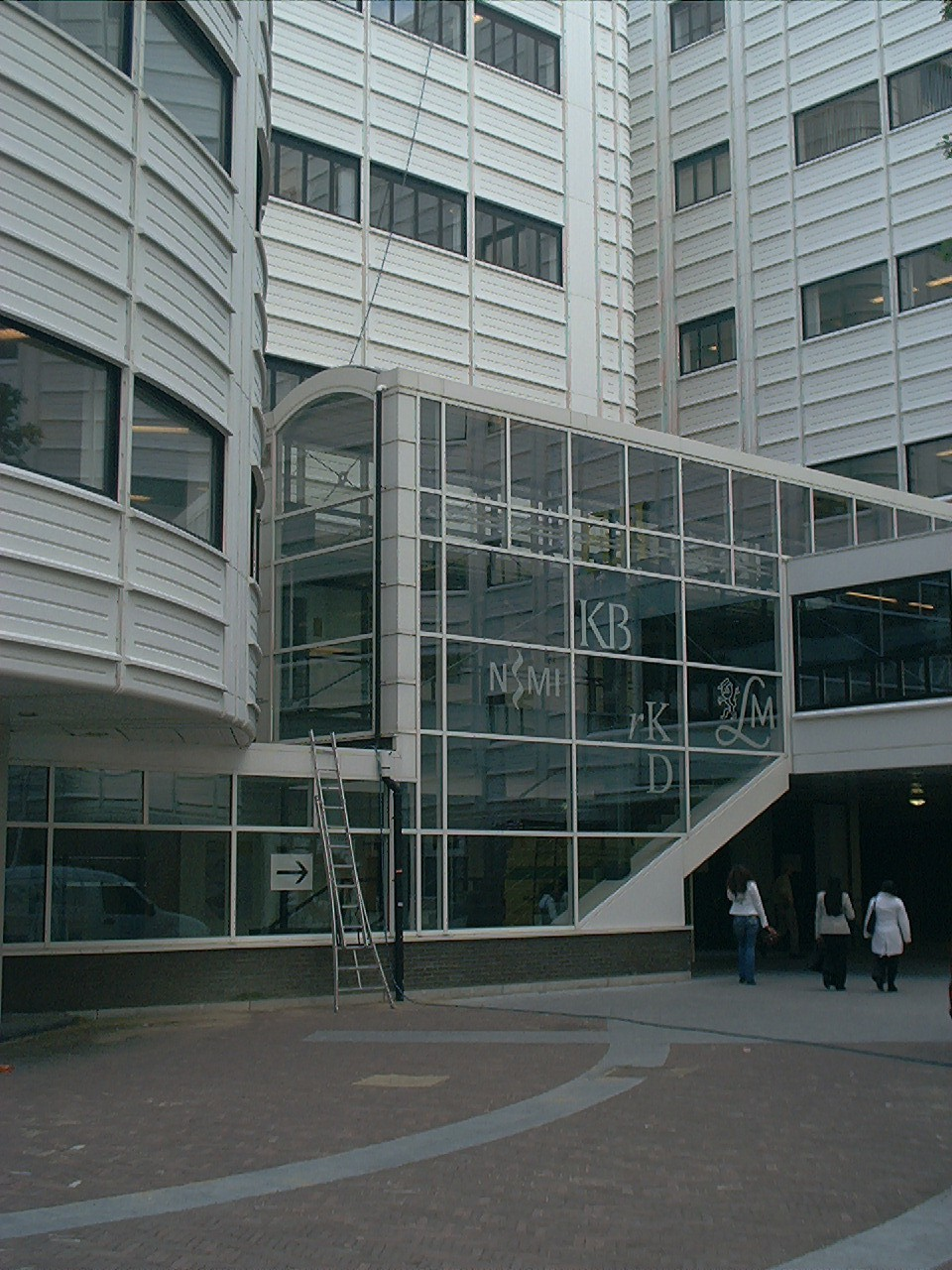
The logos on the windows of the same building as the National Archives, showing RKD, LM, NMI and the KB.

The entrance links to a walkway leading to the sister organizations housed in the same building. The large complex comprises a large apparatus to keep documents stored in optimum conditions, which the NA maintains (with government subsidies) for its sister organizations. The list of organizations housed in the complex adjoining The Hague Central Station are:

- Spaarnestad Photo archive (formerly of Haarlem)
- Biografisch Portaal
- The Koninklijke Bibliotheek (KB)
- The Centraal Bureau voor Genealogie (CBG)
- The Digital Library for Dutch Literature (DBNL)
- The International Institute of Social History (IISG)
- The Onderzoekscentrum voor Geschiedenis en Cultuur (OGC)
- The Parlementair Documentatie Centrum (PDC)
- The Netherlands Institute for Art History (RKD)
- The Netherlands Music Institute (NMI)
- Literatuurmuseum (LM)

== See also ==
- List of national archives
