= Ike Vern =

American freelance magazine photographer and documentary film maker

Ike Vern (1916-1987) was an American freelance magazine photographer and documentary film maker.

== Career ==
Ike Vern started taking photographs at 16 and worked professionally from 1938 and was employed by Click magazine. He free-lanced for Look, Life, Redbook and Collier's amongst others in the 1940s and 1950s, and was a staff photographer for Holiday. Articles on his photographic technique and on his more unusual assignments appeared regularly in Popular Photography.

Later he took photographs for in-house publications of large corporations and made documentary films for the Federation of Jewish Philanthropies in New York.

His more famous subjects included Frank Sinatra whom he photographed in 1945 in his dressing room at the Paramount Theatre and again in the company of organized crime figure Aniello Dellacroce (1963), General Eisenhower in 1951 Dr. Selman Waksman, discoverer of streptomycin, and Betty Friedan.

As early as 1942 with fellow Click magazine photographer Bradley Smith, as they were lunching with New York Post columnist and critic John Adam Knight, he raised the need for magazine photographers to “have some sort of club or something,” which eventually materialised in the Society of Magazine Photographers which was renamed the American Society of Magazine Photographers in 1946. Vern was a founding member and later a president of the Society.

In 1955 Edward Steichen selected a photograph by Vern for the world-touring Museum of Modern Art exhibition The Family of Man that was seen by 9 million visitors. The carefully flash-lit shot shows two men earnestly playing checkers in a North Carolina grocery store amongst the packaged loaves of bread, jars of sweets and sacks of flour, surrounded by three onlookers; a bemused man drinking soda and three elderly women in aprons, while in the background a laden customer exits through the screen-doors onto the porch.

== Later work ==
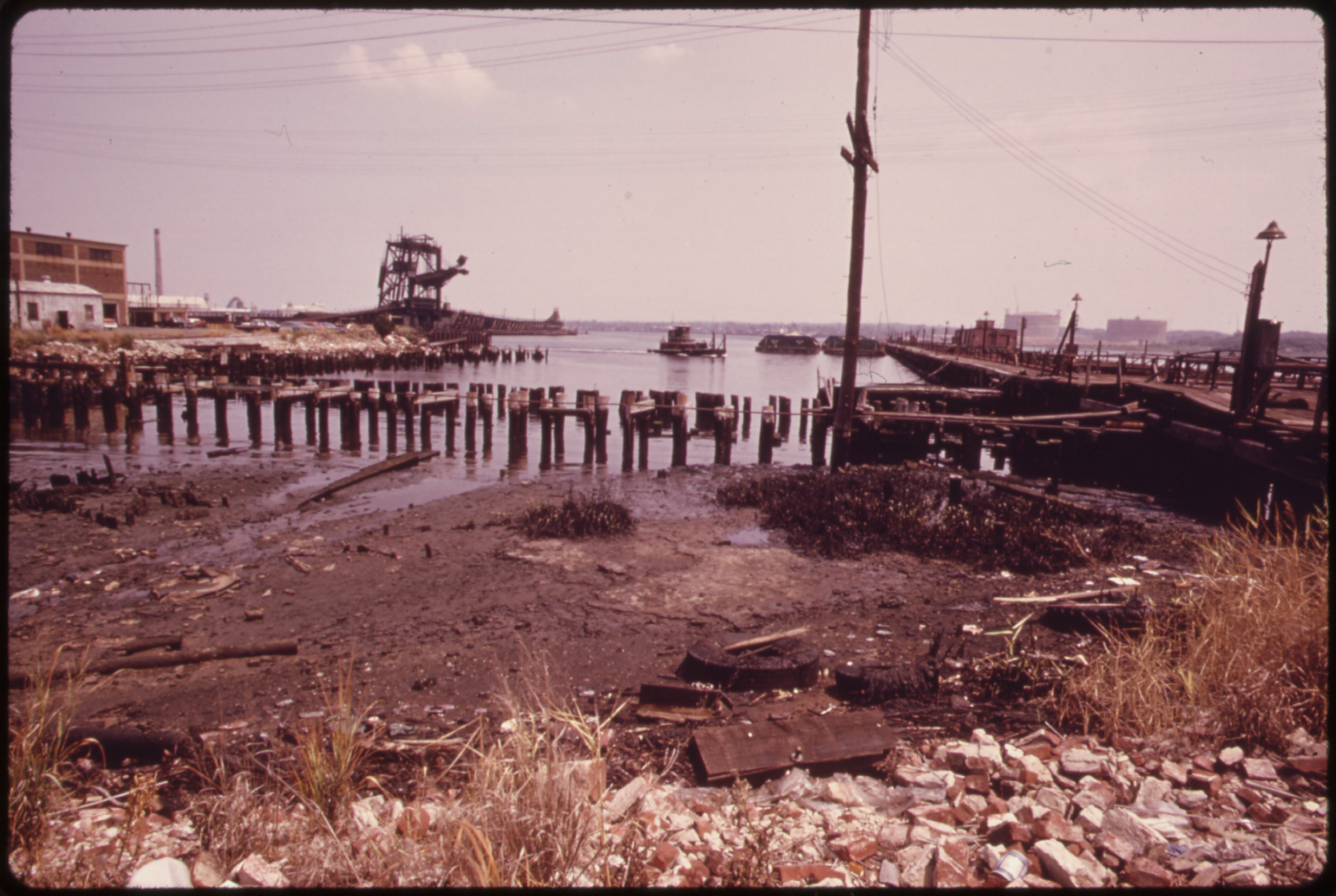
Ike Vern (1973) low tide on Arthur Kill reveals oil spills on the marsh grass at the Port Reading coal yard.

In the early 1970s Vern produced picture documentation of pollution around the chemical storage, petroleum depots and drainage outlets at Arthur Kill, Staten Island, for 'Documerica: The Environmental Protection Agency's Program to Photographically Document Subjects of Environmental Concern'.

Forty-nine of these photographs are held at the National Archives Catalog.

In the late 70s he created photographic murals for New York City high schools and La Guardia airport.

Vern died in 1987 at age 70 after heart surgery at the Texas Heart Institute of St. Luke's Hospital in Houston and was survived by his wife Harriet (née Nutels), daughter, Jane Vern, of Manhattan, and brother, David, of Brooklyn.
