= George S. Zimbel =

American-Canadian photographer (1929–2023)

- Born: George Sydney Zimbel; July 15, 1929; Woburn, Massachusetts, U.S.
- Died: January 9, 2023 (aged 93); Montreal, Canada
- Education: Columbia University
- Occupation: Documentary photographer

George S. Zimbel (July 15, 1929 – January 9, 2023) was an American-Canadian documentary photographer. He worked professionally from the late 1940s, mainly as a freelancer. He was part of the Photo League and was one of its last surviving members. Born in Massachusetts, he settled in Canada about 1971. His works have been shown with increasing frequency since 2000, and examples of his work are part of several permanent collections including the Museum of Modern Art and the Montreal Museum of Fine Arts. He was described as a humanist. Zimbel published several books of his photographs, and in 2016 was the subject of a documentary retrospective film co-directed by his son Matt Zimbel and distributed by the National Film Board of Canada.

== Life and career ==
Born George Sydney Zimbel in Woburn, Massachusetts, son of a dry goods store owner, he attended Woburn High School and was the school's yearbook photographer. He later studied at the Photo League under John Ebstel.

Zimbel enrolled at Columbia University, where he became the school's news photographer. During his time on campus, he met art student Garry Winogrand and introduced him to photography. They used the school's darkroom late at night to avoid crowding at other times of the day, and they called themselves the "Midnight to Dawn Club". Both Zimbel and Winogrand later studied under Alexey Brodovitch at the New School for Social Research on scholarships in 1951.

Zimbel next met Edward Steichen, the then curator of the Museum of Modern Art who showed Zimbel original prints by early masters of photography, and this sealed his decision to take up photography as a career. On Steichen's advice, he had a stint as a photographer with the US Army and spent two years in Europe during the restoration period following World War II.

On his return to America he became a freelance photographer. One of his early opportunities was the famous Marilyn Monroe shoot on Lexington Avenue in 1954 to promote her film The Seven Year Itch, at which Monroe wore her famous white dress. Zimbel never sold any of these images and packed them away until 1976, whereupon he printed them and began to show them in solo exhibitions.

In 1971, Zimbel and his family moved to the small community of Argyle Shore, Queens County, Prince Edward Island where they raised animals for the next 10 years at a farm they called "Bona Fide Farm". After their children moved away, he and his wife relocated to Montreal, where they still reside.

== Recognition ==
Though he was widely published in publications such as the New York Times, Look, Redbook and Architectural Digest in the 1950s and 60s, he did not become widely recognized until a retrospective exhibition of his work was mounted at the Institut Valencià d'Art Modern in Spain in 2000. Since then he has had several major shows around the world.

== Personal life and death ==
Zimbel was married to Elaine Sernovitz in 1955. A professional writer, she collaborated with George Zimbel on travelogues and other works. George and Elaine Zimbel had four children including jazz musician Matt Zimbel, founder of Manteca. Matt Zimbel co-produced and co-directed (with Jean-Francois Gratton) a documentary film about his father called Zimbelism, released in 2016.

Zimbel died in Montreal on January 9, 2023, at the age of 93.

== Publications ==
- Bourbon Street: New Orleans 1955 (2006)
- Le livre des lecteurs / A Book of Readers (2011)
- Momento: Photographs by George S. Zimbel (2015)
