= Jerry Cooke (photographer) =

American photojournalist (1921–2005)

- Born: Yuri Grigoryevich Kutschuk; October 18, 1921; Odessa
- Died: October 27, 2005 (aged 84); United States of America
- Occupation: Photojournalist

Jerry Cooke (born Yuri Peter George Kutschuk; October 18, 1921 – October 27, 2005) was an American photojournalist from the 1940s-1990s.

== Early life and work ==
Jerry Cooke was born as Yuri Kutschuk in Odessa into a Jewish family. Newborn Jerry, with his father, Gregory Kutschuk, and his mother, Assia Azrilenko, and the rest of the family emigrated to Milan, Italy and then to Berlin, Germany in 1923. While in Berlin, Gregory sold photographs to European publications. Yuri's aunt, Cecile Kutschuk, worked at the Associated Press with Wilson Hicks, who later became Executive Editor in charge of photography for Life.

In 1936, after Adolf Hitler's rise to power, the family fled back to Italy, where they then had to flee from Benito Mussolini's regime to Bombay, India. In Bombay they lived in the Outram Private Hotel owned by his uncle, George Azrilenko. In 1939, the family emigrated to United States, arriving to Seattle from Japan on the "Hiye Mare" and taking a train to New York. Once in the U.S., his name was anglicized to Jerry Cooke. Cecile Kutschuk, who had studied photojournalism at the Rhine University, emigrated to the United States in 1935 and started a photo agency in New York City called Pix Publishing. She gave Cooke his first camera, a Rolleiflex. Cecile put him to work in the Pix darkroom, where he was assistant to photographers Alfred Eisenstaedt, George Karger, and others. In 1945, on V-J Day in Times Square, Cooke was with Eisenstaedt when the latter photographed the iconic image of the nurse and sailor kissing.

His first wife, Elly Feuer, died in 1951. Shortly before his death in 2005, he married Mary Delaney.

== Career ==
Cooke's career in photojournalism began working for newspapers and magazines, including Life Magazine, Collier's, Ladies Home Journal, and others. In 1948, Cooke, Robert Capa, and Tim Gidal traveled to Israel to photograph the new state for the book, This Is Israel, written by I.F. Stone. One of Cooke's first assignments for Fortune was Nabisco, the Dough is Rising, 1948. Walker Evans described the lead photograph, "The picture is quiet and true. Since I am writing about photography let me point out that this picture is a better part of the story at hand than either a drawing or a painting would be. There is a profitable and well-run cracker firm in a sweaty part of the town, there is a knot of men talking on the pavement about anything but crackers, amidst the irrelevant trucks. This is where Mal-o-Mars are cooked and this is where last week's newspaper meets the gutter too. And the Strand Hotel becomes famous for flavour. My point is Fortune photographs should take a long look at a subject, get into it, and without shouting, tell a lot about it."

In 1950, Fortune's Art Director Leo Lionni hired Cooke to document Milwaukee factories. Cooke spent the entire summer visiting and photographing 26 factories. Cooke considered this essay an "epic effort," photographing in both color and black & white. The article, "Made in Milwaukee," appeared in November 1950.

A founding member of the American Society of Media Photographers, Cooke served as president from 1951- 1952. Cooke's portrait was photographed by Arnold Newman and used for the society's magazine. During his presidency, ASMP News became a magazine and was licensed by the State of New York to act as a labor union. Cooke's award-winning photograph, "Ohio Insane Asylum", and others were selected for the international exhibition, The Family of Man, 1955 curated by Edward Steichen for the Museum of Modern Art. This photograph appeared in Life's essay, BEDLAM 1946: Most U.S. Mental Hospitals are a Shame and a Disgrace by Albert Q. Maisel.

Cooke returned to Russia in the summer of 1957 to cover Russia and Physical Fitness for Sports Illustrated. He was one of the first westerners permitted to photograph in post-Stalin Russia. In 1958, while on assignment, Cooke decided to visit Boris Pasternak in Peredelkino, just outside Moscow. He found Pasternak working in his garden. Cooke gave Pasternak his copy of Doctor Zhivago. He travelled by bus in disguise, because photography was not permitted without the government's approval. He stayed for the day and took many photos of the writer, his wife and his dog. Soon after, Pasternak was awarded the Nobel Prize, and Cooke's photographs appeared in a Life essay, October 27, 1958. Cooke travelled extensively to Russia throughout his career, up until the mid-1990s.

Bradley Smith and Cooke founded the picture agency, Animals Animals in 1969. The agency was sold in the late 1970s and renamed Animals Animals Earth Scenes. During the late 1980s, Cooke traveled to major over crowded cities to photograph the condition of the population. His photographs were published in The Exploding City in 1989 by the United Nations. Cooke spoke several languages, visited five continents and well over a hundred countries.

His archive is housed at the Briscoe Center for American History.

=== Sports photography ===
In 1953, after seeing his photographs of a football game for a Life essay, Cooke was recruited by Gerald Astor to photograph for a new magazine, Sports Illustrated. This launched Cooke's career in sports photography. Cooke worked for over 40 years, shooting 47 covers for Sports Illustrated, including many from the early days starting in October 1954. In the 1973 World Series, Cooke captured Willie Mays arguing with umpire Augie Donatelli in one of the ten greatest World Series photographs. Cooke was named Director of Photography for Sports Illustrated in 1974. He photographed 16 Olympics and 42 Kentucky Derbies, including three Triple Crown winners: Secretariat (horse), Seattle Slew, and Affirmed. Many of his derby photographs were published in The Kentucky Derby, by Joe Hirsch and Jim Bolus, 1988.

Neil Leifer said, "Jerry was the closest thing to James Bond that the photography world has ever seen.... He was a gentleman photographer."
