= Peter Werner Häberlin =

Swiss photographer

Peter Werner Häberlin (25 May 1912 – 9 July 1953) was a Swiss photographer noted for his picture series made on treks across Saharan Africa between 1949 and 1952.

== Biography ==
Peter Häberlin was born in 1912 in Kreuzlingen near Konstanz on Lake Constance (the Obersee Bodensee) and grew up in Singen, in Germany, just across the Swiss border. From 1928-1931 he took up an apprenticeship with a pastry chef in Berneck, Switzerland, at the eastern end of Lake Constance.

== Travel ==
At 21 years old Häberlin set out from his home in Canton Thurgau to walk to Africa and from 1932 to 1934 journeyed on foot from Switzerland to Italy stopping at Capri and Positano, before proceeding on to Palermo, where he embarked on a ship to Tunisia and Algeria where he saw the desert and stopped at the oasis of Biskra before heading farther south to the city of Touggourt. In Constantine, Algeria, Häberlin worked in the famous Pâtisserie Viennoise to restore his travel funds. He returned via Morocco and Gibraltar and subsequently made other trips in Europe during which, in 1935 in Stockholm, he attempted to meet the Swedish explorer Sven Hedin, who was known for his explorations of Asia, also in large desert areas, reported in his books published since the nineteenth century that were read avidly by Häberlin.

== Photographer ==
In 1938/9 Häberlin studied sculpture and photography at the Hansische Hochschule, Hamburg until WW2 forced him out of Germany. He then enrolled in photography at the Kunstgewerbeschule in Zürich from 1940 to 1943 where he studied under Hans Finsler, a major proponent of Neue Sachlichkeit. After his graduation Häberlin's work was published in Atlantis and Du. In 1948 he married Jolita Coughlin, an American student (whose portrait was taken by Edward Weston, and is in the collection of the Museum of Fine Arts, Boston). They are survived by a daughter and two grandsons.

Häberlin undertook four extensive tours of North Africa over 1949-1952, often retracing his previous journeys, on the established caravan routes, on foot, by bicycle and on transport, crossing the Saharan desert until he reached North Cameroon. He photographed the peoples and architecture in locations including Colomb-Béchar (now Béchar), northern Algeria, in El Golea, central-northern Algeria, in a Tuareg camp near the Hoggar mountains, French Sudan (now Mali), Salah, central Algeria, northern Sahara, and Ghardaia cemetery, northern Algeria.

Häberlin made scant written documentation of his journeys, and what biographical detail there is about him during this period is gleaned from his few letters home to his wife Jolita, and from the photographs themselves.

== Recognition ==
His frank, full-face photograph of a young woman with braided hair and decorative cicatrices on her cheeks and nose, taken in bright desert sunlight, is typical of his work in Northern Africa; made out of his curiosity about a timeless, unspoilt culture. It was selected by curator Edward Steichen for the world-touring Museum of Modern Art exhibition The Family of Man, seen by 9 million visitors and published in a catalogue which has sold 4 million copies and has never been out of print. An Associated Press report of the time suggests that the picture may have been amongst those torn down in Moscow by the Nigerian student Theophilus Neokonkwo while The Family of Man was being exhibited there at its last venue in 1959. His actions were in a protest at colonialist attitudes to black races.

== Death and legacy ==
Shortly after returning from his last trip, Häberlin died in a tragic accident in Zürich in 1953, in the midst of his preparations for a new expedition to Mexico. His estate was bequeathed to the Fotostiftung Switzerland, Winterthur.

Some of his photographs were published posthumously in 1956 in the book Yallah, completed by Häberlin’s father with the help of the American author Paul Bowles and with a foreword by Bowles who in 1933 also trekked through the Algerian Sahara to Tunisia. The New Yorker in a 1957 review reported that it was the work “of one of the great photographers of our times, capable of showing, as only art can, what would otherwise have remained hidden”, and other reviewers discern a poetic dimension to pictures that in other contexts would be documentary. Without the book, Häberlin would likely have remained unknown.

== Publications ==
- Borellini, Alessia, ed. (2012), Sahara : Peter W. Häberlin : fotografie, 1949-1952 (in German) (Prima edizione ed.), [Firenze] Giunti, ISBN 978-88-09-78138-2
- Pfrunder, Peter; Gasser, Martin; Imboden, Martin (2006), Martin Imboden, Wilhelm Felber, Peter W. Häberlin, Martin Glaus, Gerda Meyerhof, Doris Quarella, Hugo Jaeggi : vergessen & verkannt [Martin Imboden, Wilhelm Felber, Peter W. Häberlin, Martin Glaus, Gerda Meyerhof, Doris Quarella, Hugo Jaeggi : forgotten & misunderstood] (in German), Limmat, ISBN 978-3-85791-512-3
- Bowles, Paul (1956), Yallah, Manesse

== Exhibitions ==
- Peter W. Häberlin: Sahara. Fotografie 1949-1952, Museo di Roma in Trastevere, Rome, 2 February – 12 March 2017
- Vergessen & verkannt. Sieben Positionen aus der Sammlung ('Forgotten & misjudged: seven perspectives from the collection'), Wilhelm Felber, Martin Glaus, Peter W. Häberlin, Martin Imboden, Hugo Jaeggi, Gerda Meyerhof, Doris Quarella. Fotostiftung Schweiz Grüzenstr. 45, 8400 Winterthur, 3 June 3 – 20 August 2006.

== See also ==
- Auguste Maure
- Jean Geiser
