= Édouard Foà =

French explorer and travel writer (1862–1901)

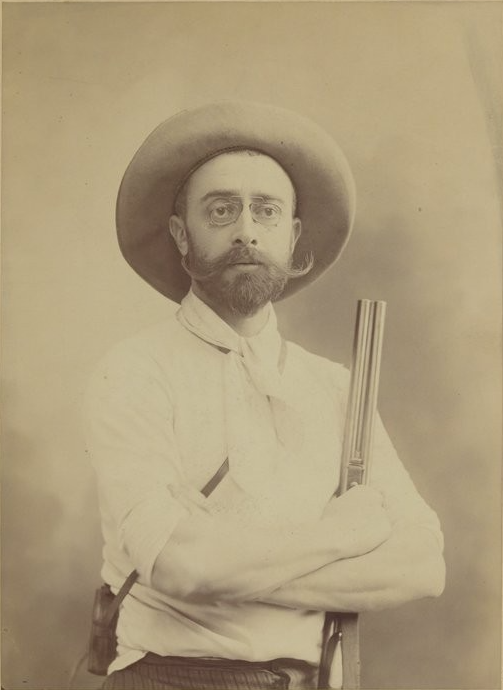
- Édouard Foà, ca. 1889
- Born: 17 December 1862; Marseille, France
- Died: 29 June 1901 (aged 38); Villers-sur-Mer, France
- Occupations: Explorer, travel writer, photographer
- Years active: 1884–1901
- Known for: Explorations and 19th-century photography in Africa
- Awards: Knight of the Legion of Honour

Édouard Foà, born Aron Fortuné Emmanuel Édouard Georges Foà, (17 December 1862–29 June 1901) was a late 19th-century French explorer, photographer and travel writer. He is mainly known for two expeditions across southern and central Africa between 1891 and 1897. Following this, he published nine books on his travels between 1895 and 1901, most of them with photomechanical reproductions of his legacy of more than 500 photographs.

Through his publications, he enriched Western knowledge about Africa of the late 19th century with geographical, ethnographical, political and social descriptions, as well as documentary images. For this, he was awarded important distinctions by the French Geographical Society, the Académie Française and the highest order of merit of the French Republic, the Knight of the Legion of Honour.

== Biography ==
=== Early life and expeditions in Africa ===
The son of a merchant from Marseille and the nephew of French writer Eugénie Foà, Édouard Foà spent his school years at Bône – modern-day Annaba – in former French Algeria, and in Tunis, the capital of the French protectorate of Tunisia. When his father died, he worked for the British consulate in Tunis as a young interpreter. At the same time, he held a job in the colonial postal service. At the age of 18, he enlisted as a volunteer in the French army of Africa. In his early 20s, he left the army with the rank of a non-commissioned officer in order to work for the colonial trading company Mante & Régis in Marseille.

In 1886, the same trading company employed Foà as manager of a trading post in Porto-Novo in the French colony of Dahomey, present-day Benin. From 1886 to 1890, Foà explored Dahomey and the neighbouring regions of the Gulf of Guinea. In 1890 he returned to France and was hired by a French financial company to investigate economic possibilities in southern and eastern Africa.

In 1891, he was commissioned by the French National Museum of Natural History to explore the countries neighbouring the Zambesi river and to report on the prospects of trade and transport routes in the region. On this journey that took him two years, he travelled through various regions in southern Africa, focusing on the countries situated north of the Zambesi and west of the Shire river. Foá wrote two books about these experiences, titled Du Zambèze au Congo (From the Zambezi river to Congo) and Chasses aux grands fauves pendant la traversée du continent noir du Zambèze au Congo français (1899). The latter was published the same year in English as After Big Game in Central Africa.

In 1894, he went on his second long journey, exploring the region from Cape Town up to Lake Tanganyika and Lake Nyassa, today's Lake Malawi, and the south-eastern region of Katanga Province in the Congo Free State. Along with five other Europeans, he had recruited three hundred porters for this expedition. The magazine Journal des Voyages reported about this expedition on 30 September 1894:

Édouard Foà, whose explorations in Dahomey, in the French possessions in the Gulf of Guinea, and more recently in Southern and Central Africa, have brought him to the attention of the public, has just been entrusted with a scientific mission by the Ministry of Public Education. It is Central Africa and the region of lakes Nyassa and Tanganyika that the young and courageous explorer intends to study, from the point of view of ethnography and natural history.

— Journal des Voyages

During three years of travel, he again combined his investigations as explorer with his passion for hunting. In 1895, he published his travel account Mes grandes chasses dans l'Afrique centrale. (My great hunting in Central Africa) and in 1901, Du Cap au Lac Nyassa (From the Cape to Lake Nyassa).

In 1895, Foà dedicated his book Le Dahomey, to French General Alfred-Amédée Dodds, who during the Second Franco-Dahomean War (1892–1894) had defeated the Kingdom of Dahomey and destroyed the Royal Palace of Abomey. His last work Résultats scientifiques des voyages en Afrique. (Scientific Results of Travels in Africa) was published as a posthumous publication by his wife under the auspices of the French National Museum of Natural History in 1908.

Foà understood the publication of his explorations as benefitting "geography, ethnography, natural history, science, commerce, industry and colonization." Altogether, Foá travelled across Africa for seven years and published nine books, as well as several articles in scientific journals. Most of these were illustrated with photomechanical reproductions of his photographs that he included as visual records of his travels.

=== Personal life ===
In 1899, Foà married Fanny Victorine Vitta, daughter of the Italian baron and banker Jonas Vitta and sister of Joseph and Émile Vitta, at the Villa La Sapinière in Évian-les-Bains. He died two years later in Villers-sur-Mer, aged 38, caused by malaria contracted in Africa. He is buried in the Montparnasse cemetery.

== Distinctions ==
- Grande Médaille d'Or des Explorations, 1898
- Knight of the Legion of Honour, 1899
- Montyon Prize of the Académie Française, 1897 and 1901

== Publications ==
- Dahomiens et Egbas. In La Nature no. 926, 28. February 1891 and no. 930, 28. March 1891.
- Territoires situés entre les fleuves Zambèze et Chiré, par Edouard Foa, 1891–1893.
- "Le Dahomey: histoire, géographie, moeurs, coutumes, commerce, industrie, expéditions françaises (1891–1894)". A. Hennuyer. 1895.
- Traversée de l'Afrique équatoriale (in French). Rouen, Imprimerie E. Cagniard. 1898.
- Mes grandes chasses dans l'Afrique centrale. Paris, Firmin-Didot, 1895 (New editions: Paris, Plon, 1899; Paris, Montbel, 2006 ISBN 9782914390392).
- Chasses aux grands fauves pendant la traversée du continent noir du Zambèze au Congo français. Paris: Plon. 1899.
  - (New editions: Collection Classiques de la chasse, 76 illustrations by Roger Reboussin, Paris, Visaphone, 1963; and Paris, Montbel, 2006 ISBN 9782914390699).
  - English translation: After Big Game in Central Africa. Records of a Sportsman from August 1894 to November 1897, when crossing the Dark Continent from the Mouth of the Zambesi to the French Congo. London, A. & C. Black, 1899. Republished by Legare Street Press in 2022, ISBN 978-1-01-645024-9
- L'invasion européenne en Afrique. Sa marche, ses progrès, son état actuel. Revue Scientifique, 4th séries, vol. XI : no. 18, 6. May 1899.
- À travers l'Afrique d'après Édouard Foà. Revue Scientifique, 4th series – vol. XIII : no. 6, 11. August 1900.
- Du cap au lac Nyassa. Paris, Plon, 1901, 381 p., with 16 prints after photographs by the author.
- Résultats scientifiques des voyages en Afrique. Publiés sous les auspices du Muséum national d’Histoire Naturelle. Préface de M. Edmond Perrier. Paris : Imprimerie Nationale, 1908. (Published by Mme. Édouard Foà)

== Reception ==
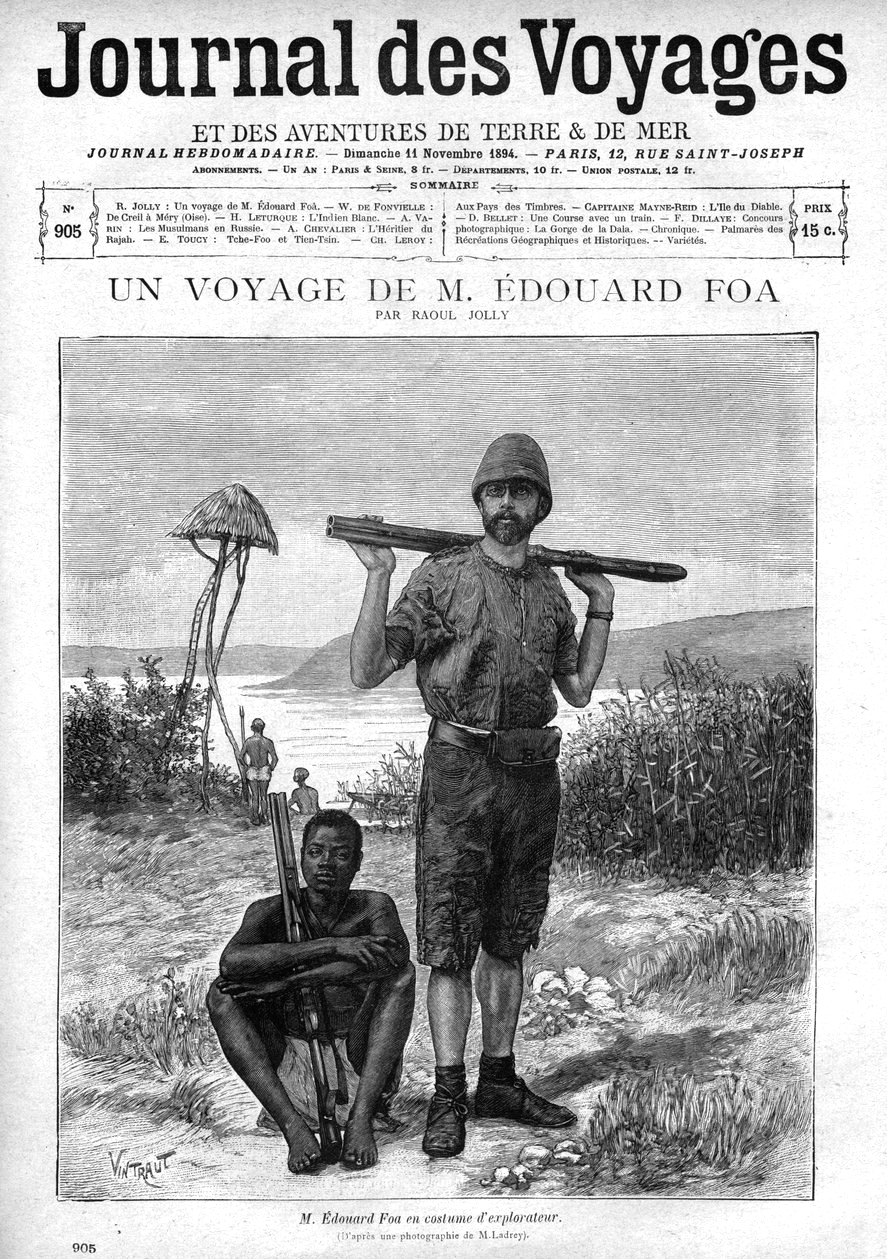
Foà on title page of Journal des Voyages, 11 Nov. 1894

=== Recognition of his travelogues ===
Following his expeditions, Foá's travel writing and photographic output were published first in France and some of it also in the United Kingdom. Further, the Journal des voyages magazine of 11 November 1894 published an article by Raoul Jolly entitled Un voyage de M. Édouard Foà, followed by further sequels about Foá's travels.

His book After big game in Central Africa. Records of a Sportsman from August 1894 to November 1897, when crossing the Dark Continent from the Mouth of the Zambesi to the French Congo was published in 1899 in an English translation by A. & C. Black, London, and reprinted in 2022. This book on big-game hunting was praised in The Athenaeum literary magazine, citing St. James's Gazette newspaper: "Mr. Foà, whose book has just been published, is entitled to take rank with the greatest English hunters – Gordon, Cumming, Selous, Kirby and Sir Samuel Baker. The book is full of exciting adventures and interesting observations on wild animals."

For his travels and following accounts, he was honoured with the Grande Médaille d'Or des Explorations by the French Geographical Society, the world's oldest geographical society, in 1898. His travelogues Du Cap au lac Nyassa (1897) and Du Zambèze au Congo français: La traversée d’Afrique. Chasses aux grands fauves (1901) were both awarded the Montyon Prize by the Académie Française. For his services to France, he was further distinguished with the Knight's Cross of the Legion of Honour in 1899.

At the 1899 Universal Exhibition in Paris, a room about French scientific missions in Africa presented specimens from Foà's collections, the remains of large wild animals, as well as examples of the equipment, rifles, luggage and other instruments he used during his exploration campaigns. An obituary by the Royal Geographical Society, whose member Foá had been since 1894, noted that Foa "contributed his share to the filling in of details on our maps, and in particular did useful work in elucidating the ethnology of the countries in which he travelled."

Since 1905, the Société de Géographie has awarded the Édouard Foà Prize for geographical works on various parts of the world.

=== Collections of Foá's photographs ===
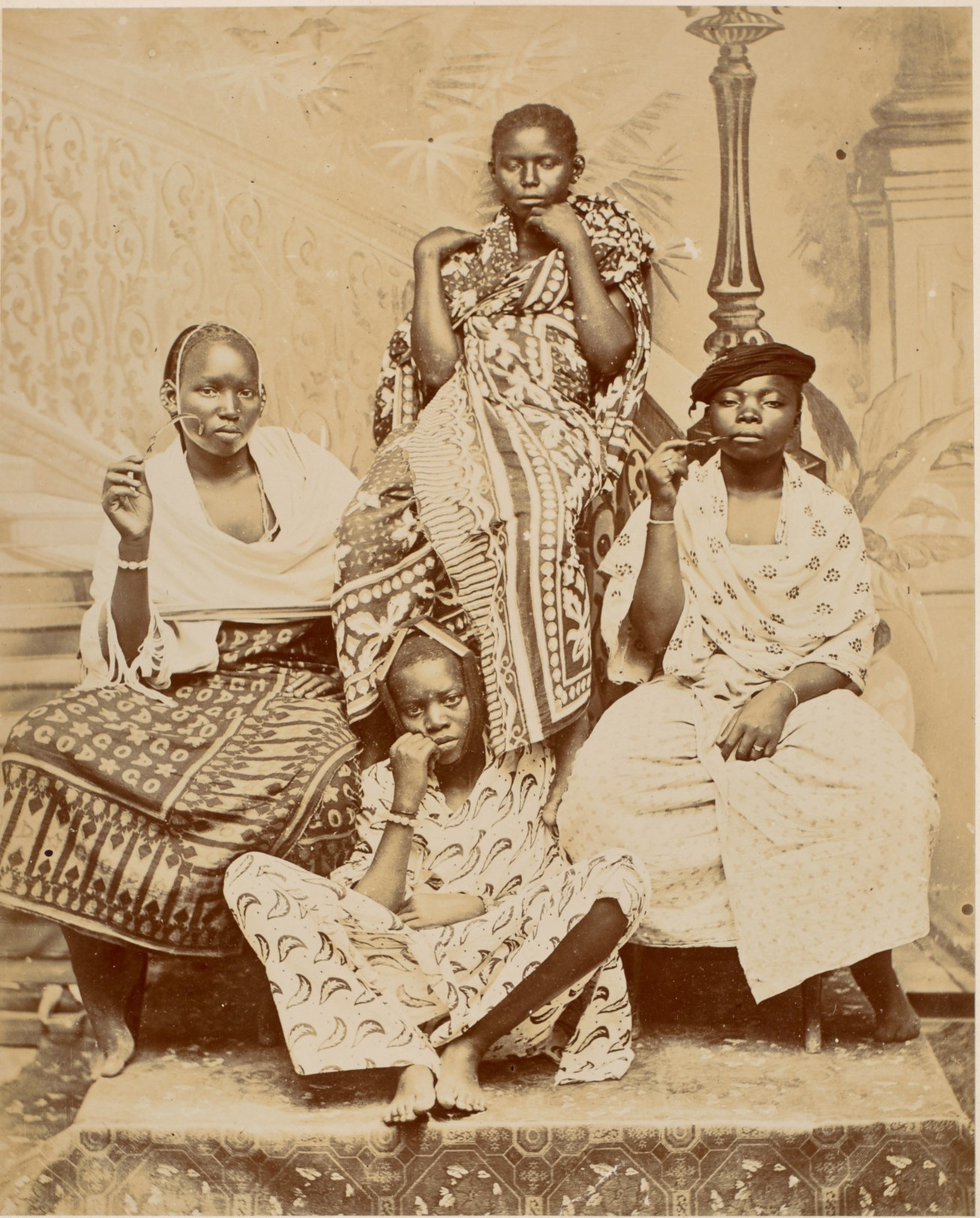
Women in Zanzibar, ca. 1897

During this travels in Africa between 1886 and 1897, Foà took more than 500 photographs and bought others from commercial studios operating in the coastal cities. Organized into seven annotated albums, his photographs provide visual records of various indigenous peoples and places in Africa. The Getty Research Institute’s special collections hold seven photographic albums of albumen prints that "provide insight into Africa in the late 1800s and the explorers who sought to document the vast continent and its varied peoples." Along with other examples of photographs as documents of visual history, these were presented in the Institute's 2013/14 exhibition Connecting Seas: A Visual History of Discoveries and Encounters.

In an article about French colonial collections at the Getty Research Institute (GRI), the author called Foa's albums "perhaps the most remarkable" among the collections and added: "Intended primarily as ethnographic studies, Foà's photographs also capture historic events such as the crowning of a chief in Accra [...], and significant local architecture, as in an early view of the Salaga mosque [...]. Even the studio portraits Foà purchased in Zanzibar represent important visual documents [...]."

Apart from the photographs in the GRI, the French National Library in Paris has 48 historical photographs by Foà of Ashanti people in present-day Ghana and of scenes in Dahomey, Lagos and Abeokuta in modern-day Nigeria.

== Gallery ==
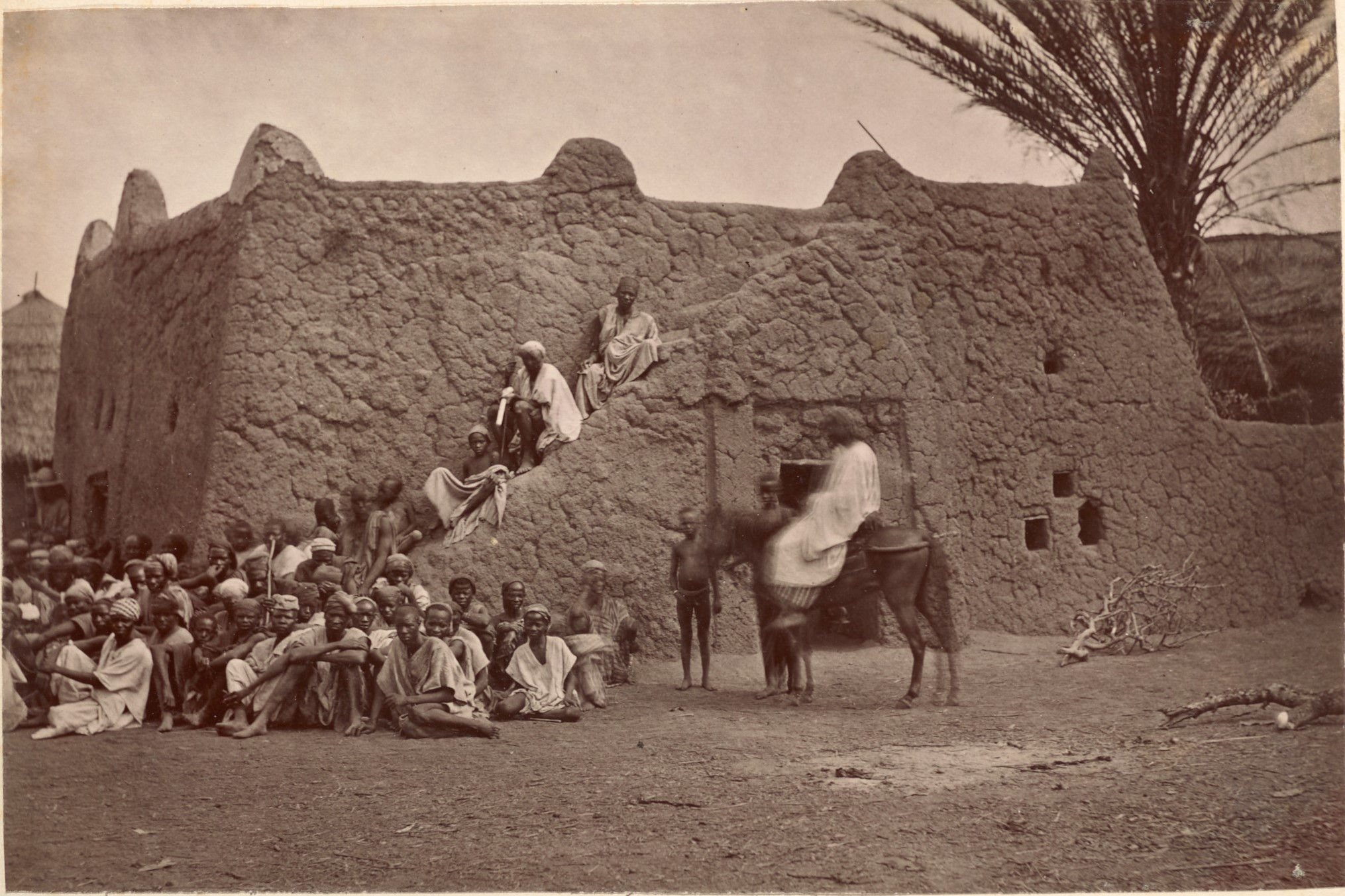
Mosque at Salaga

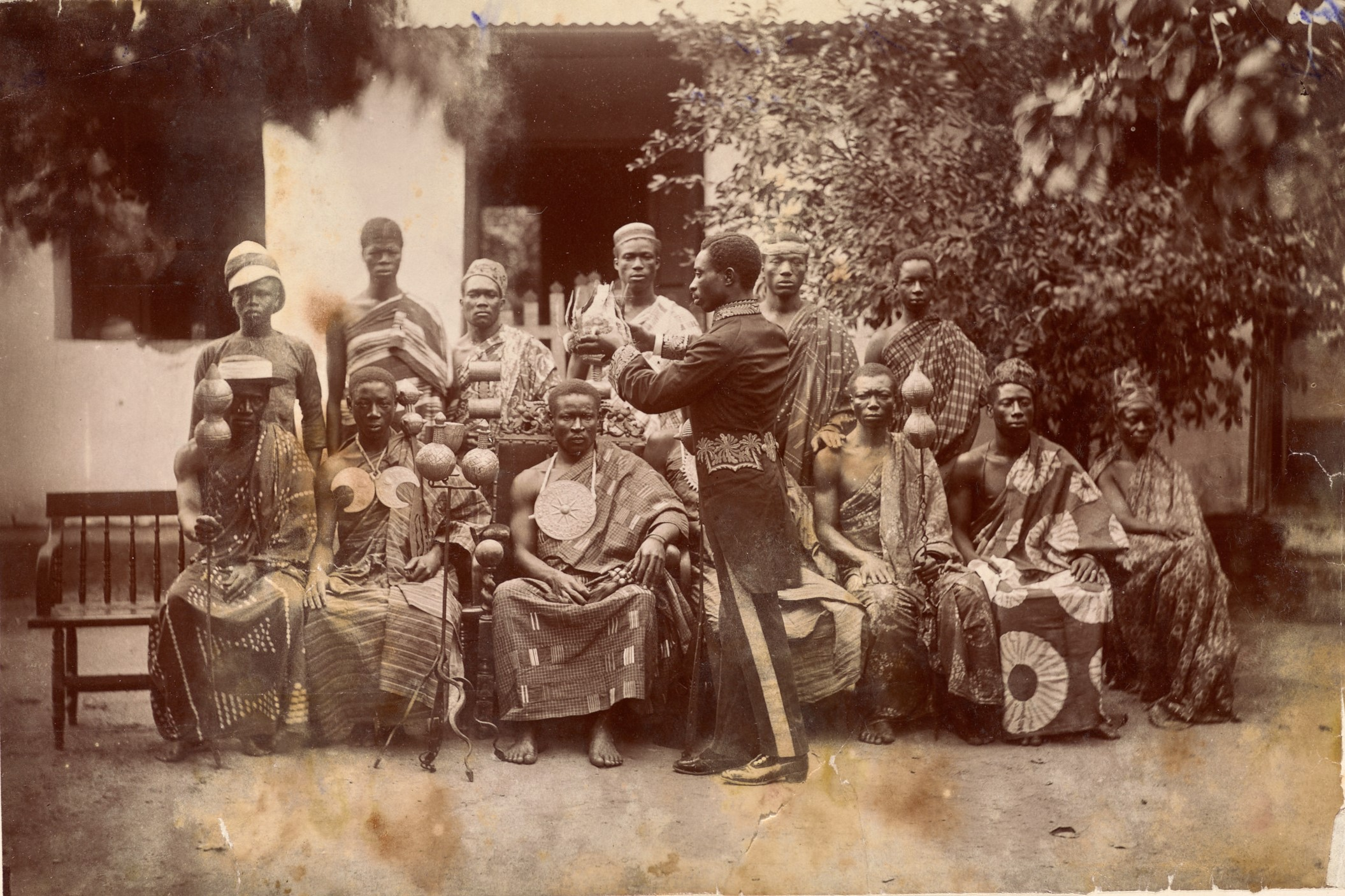
Crowning of a Nigerian dignitary

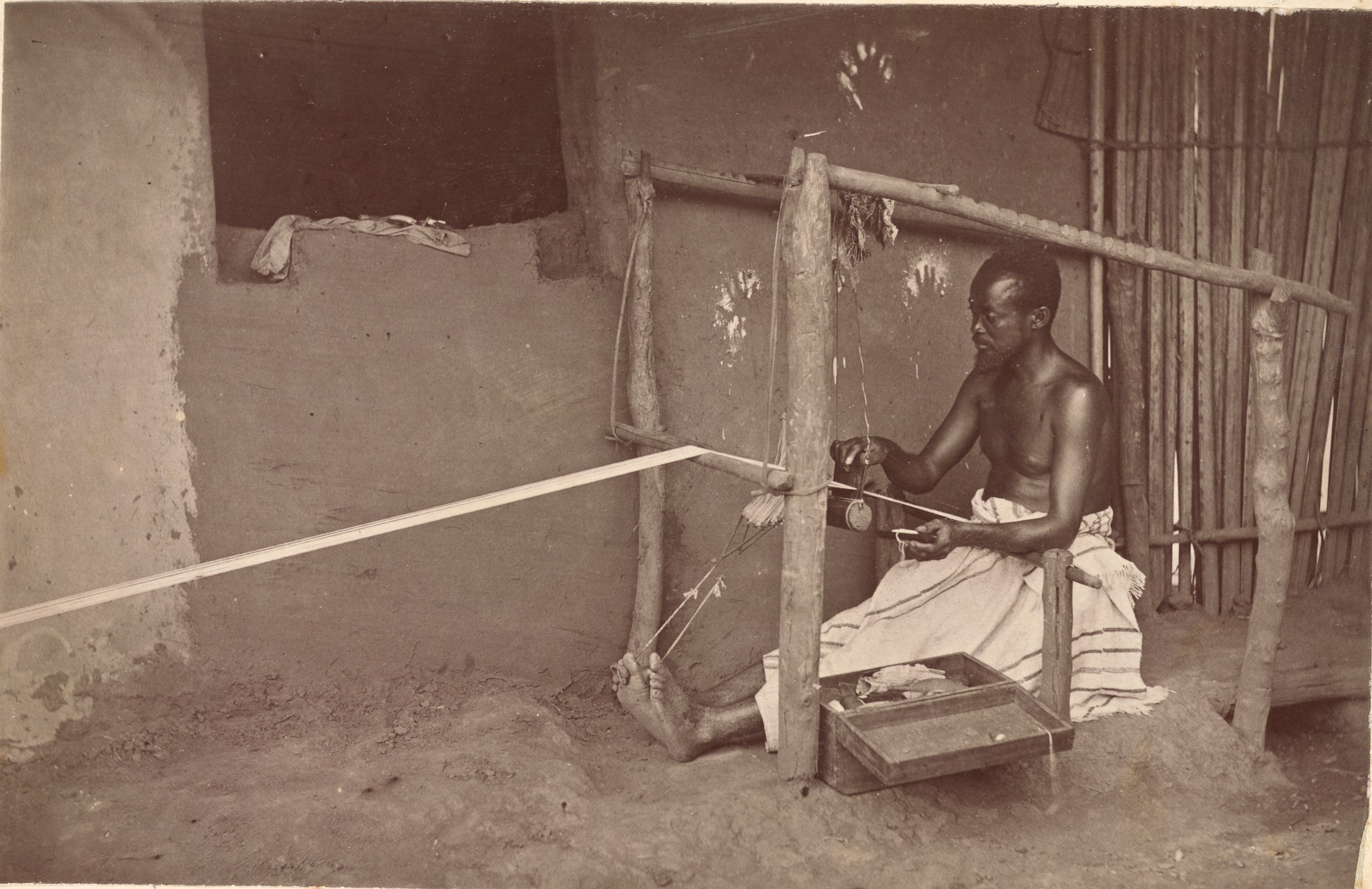
Weaver in West Africa

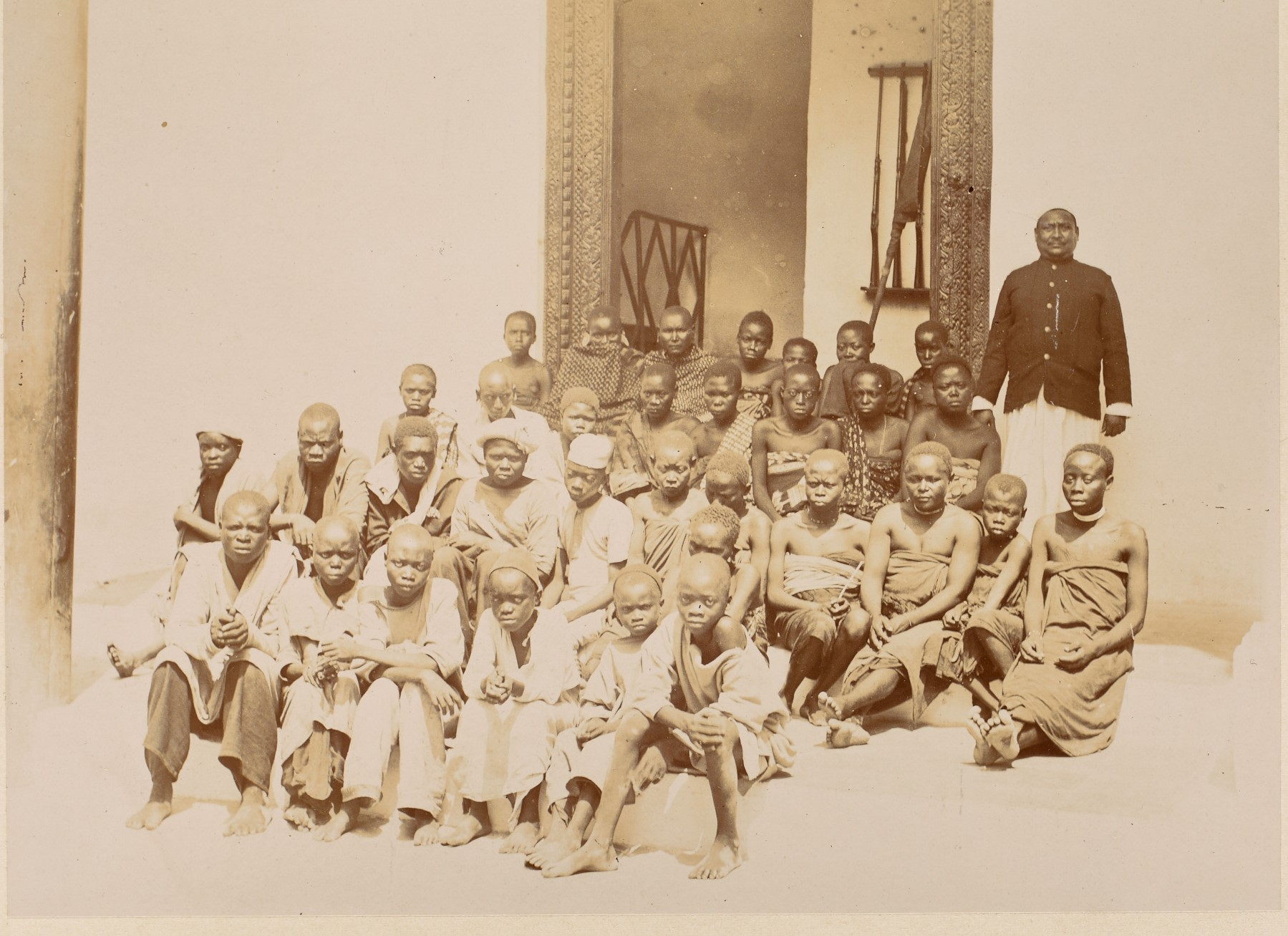
Slaves of the Sultan in Zanzibar

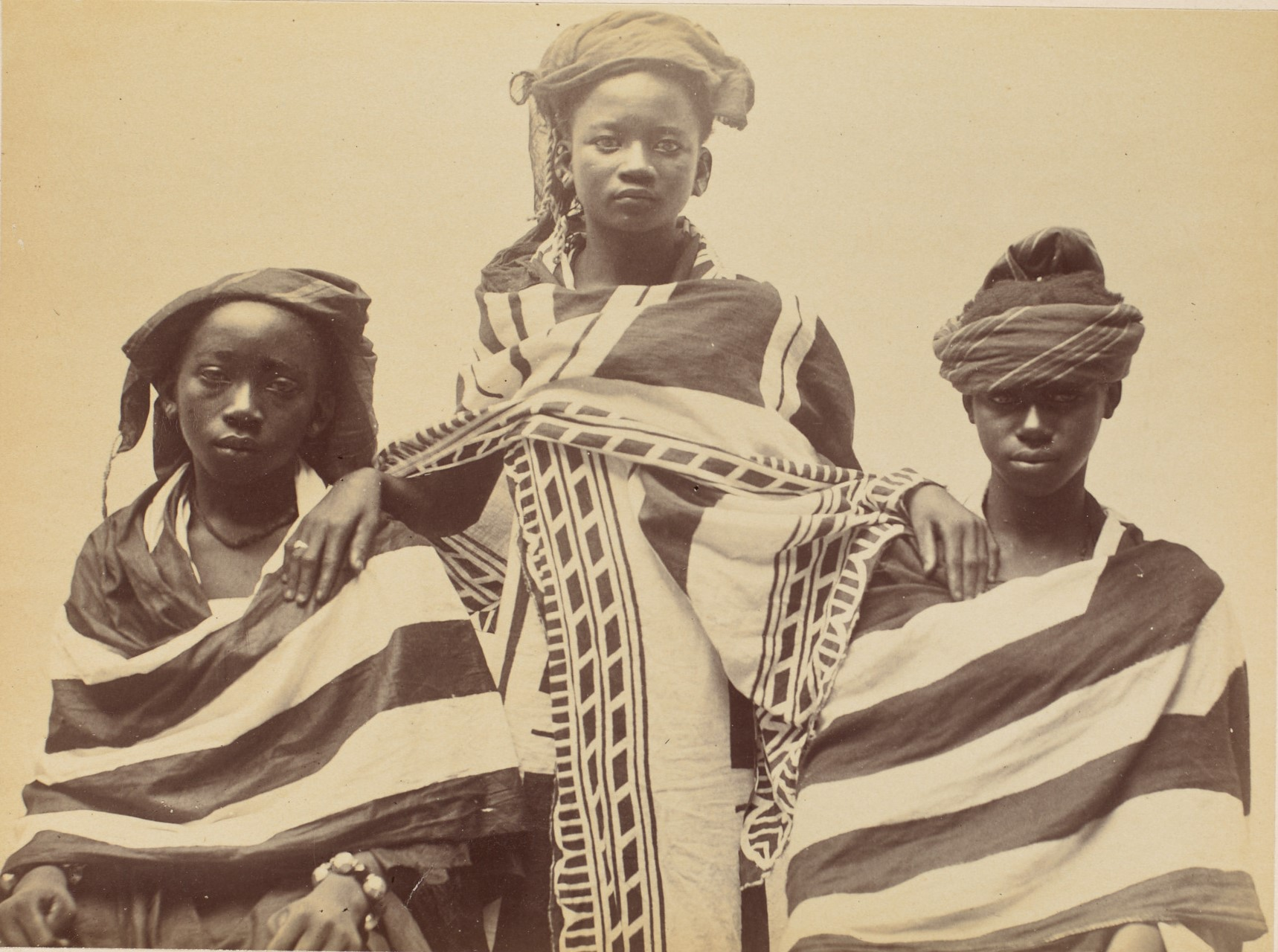
Three women in Zanzibar

== See also ==
- François-Edmond Fortier
- Casimir Zagourski
- Jean Geiser

== Literature ==
- Numa Broc, Dictionnaire des Explorateurs français du XIXe siècle, T.1, Afrique, CTHS, 1988, pp. 143–145.
- Guilloteau, Anne, sous la direction de Mme Hélène d’Almeida-Topor. L’Afrique de la fin du XIXe siècle vue à travers un explorateur : Édouard Foà (1862–1901). Thèse Université Paris 1, Panthéon-Sorbonne, 1996 (in French).
