= François-Edmond Fortier =

French photographer (1862–1928)

- Born: 2 September 1862; Celles-sur-Plaine
- Died: 24 February 1928; Dakar
- Citizenship: French
- Occupations: Documentary and portrait photographer
- Years active: 1898–1920

François-Edmond Fortier (2 September 1862 – 8 February 1928) was a French photographer, publisher of postcards and visual ethnographer. In his more than 3,300 images and postcards of French West Africa (Afrique Occidentale Française), he documented landscapes, African and colonial buildings, the urban developments in Dakar, everyday life in the countryside, as well as political and economic leaders. His postcards encompass both ethnographic documentation and staged portraiture, some of which showing eroticized depictions of indigenous women. Photographs and reprints of his work have since been reproduced as documents of visual culture of life in French West Africa.

Prints of Fortier's historical photographs have been collected as examples of early 20th-century photography in Africa by the Metropolitan Museum of Art, the Library of Congress, the Smithsonian Institution, the Museum of Fine Art, Boston, UNESCO, as well as by collections in France.

== Biography ==
Fortier was born in the small village of Plaine, in the Vosges region of France in 1862. His parents were farmers on land with scarce harvests. In July 1883, Fortier moved to Paris, where he worked as an accountant for a wholesale company in the textiles business. He got married in 1884 to a woman of Alsatian background, and they had their first daughter the following year.

Having arrived in Senegal some time after 1888 in his late 20s, Fortier first worked in Saint-Louis, the capital of French West Africa at the time. After 1 December 1898, Fortier is known as photographer at the Saint-Louis studio of Émile Noal, the local correspondent for the Paris-based weekly Le Monde illustré. Next to fellow photographer Louis Hostalier, who worked for the Paris weekly A travers le Monde, Noal had established himself as successful photographer in the French colony.

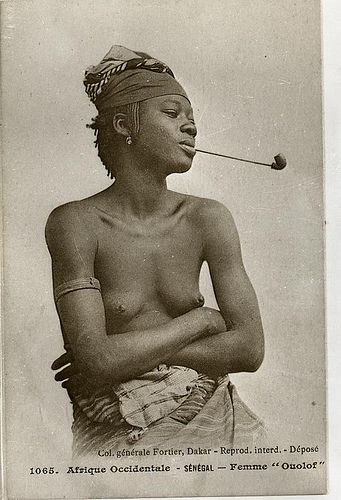
Woman from the Wolof ethnic group

In 1900, Fortier moved to Dakar, which became the new capital as of 1902. From 1902 to 1903, he explored Fouta-Djalon, then Haute-Guinée, and from 1905 to 1906 he travelled in the former French Sudan (present-day Mali), staying in Bamako, Djenné and the military territory of Tombouctou, where he photographed Tuareg horsemen who had been fighting the French. In 1906, he published 500 postcards based on these journeys as Collection Générale. These images show Conakry, Kankan and Kindia and the Bandiagara escarpment. Activities covered include French tax collecting and railway construction, the daily lives of riverside dwellers and townspeople, fishing and pirogues, the production of karité butter as well as cotton spinning and weaving.

This was followed by further journeys in 1908 and 1909 to French Dahomey (present-day Benin), where he worked on official assignment alongside colonial authorities, producing images of rulers, ceremonies and daily life. Fortier made his living as a professional photographer and publisher of postcards, creating some 3,300 original images and many re‑editions in the two decades from 1901 to 1920. They are the earliest professional photographs of several places in West Africa, for example of the Dogon country and Tombouctu. His images were taken in over 100 locations in colonial regions of today's Senegal, Guinea-Conakry, Mali, the Ivory Coast, Benin and Nigeria. His postcards encompass both ethnographic documentation and staged portraiture, including his series of "Études" with many eroticized depictions of indigenous women.

Fortier spent his later years in his shop on the corner of Boulevard Pinet-Laprade/Rue Dagorne in the Médina of Dakar until his death on 28 February 1928.

== Reception ==
=== Scholarly studies ===
Fortier's original plates or negatives having been lost, research about his work relies on publications and collections of original prints. From 1986 to 1988, French scholar Phillip David published three volumes of Fortier's comprehensive catalogue documenting his numerous postcards. In 1995, the association Images & Mémoires (I&M) started a project in order to rescue, preserve and study West African photography. With the support of UNESCO's World Memory Programme, the association published a CD-ROM with over 3,000 reproductions of postcards depicting West Africa from 1895 to 1930. About 900 of the images in this collection had been published by Fortier. The selection from his legacy notably did not include Fortier's images of nude women.

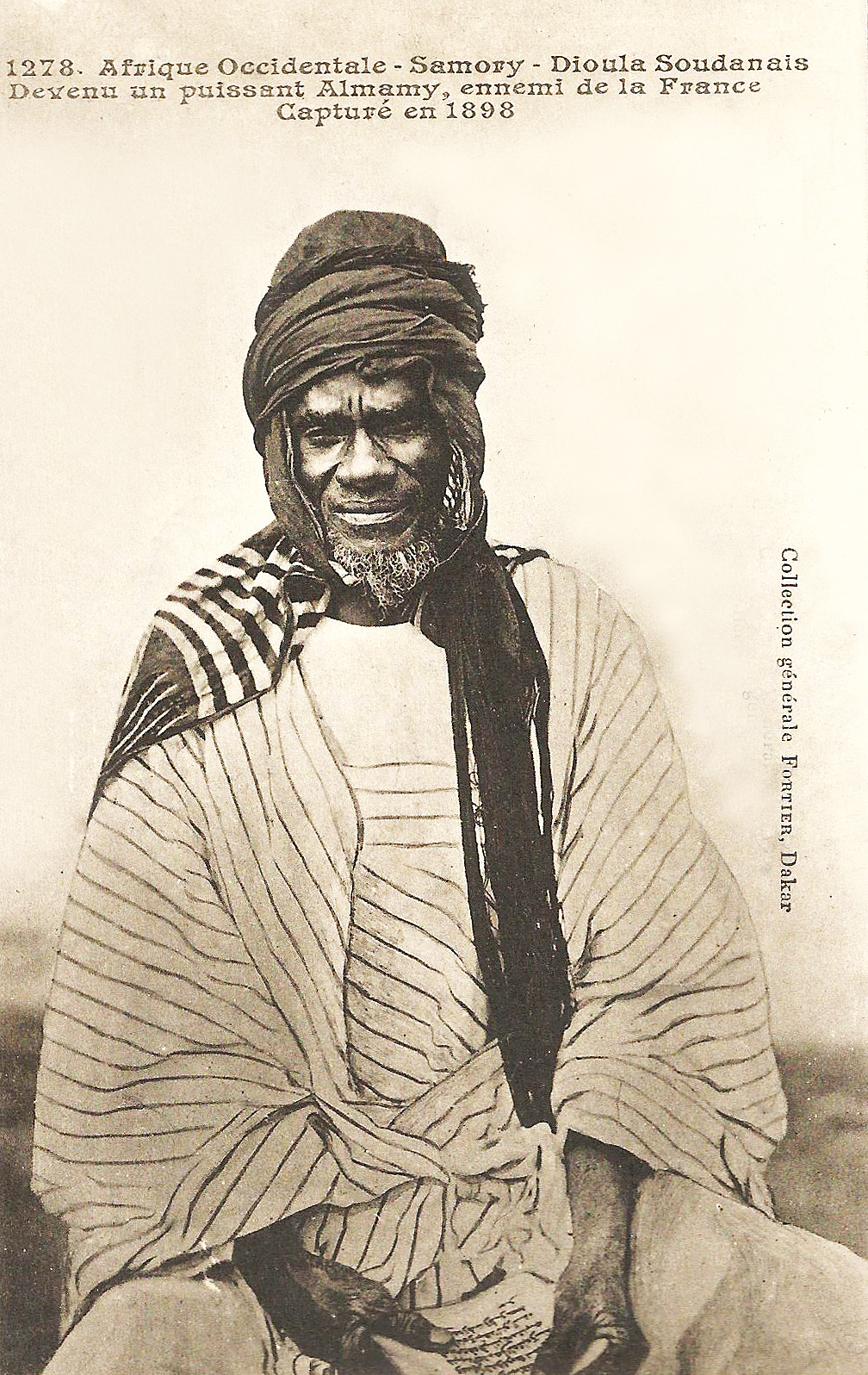
Portrait of Samory Touré holding a Quran, c. 1899

Apart from other scholars, Brazilian historian Daniela Moreau has published several studies of Fortier's work. One of these covered Fortier's travels to Toumbouctu in 1906, and another one his journey to Dahomey from 1908 to 1909. In her 2007 paper, Patricia Hickling discussed the professional relationship between photographer Émile Noal and Fortier. Based on historical evidence and stylistic comparison of several images, she posited that these images had actually been taken and published by Noal and were later published by Fortier under his own name. As the new owners of a photographic studio often kept and republished photographs by the previous photographer, cultural anthropologist Christraud M. Geary also wrote that Fortier had published his earliest postcard series with images by Noal and another French photographer under his own name.

Further, Moreau discussed images that Fortier had changed in his later editions, for example by deleting colonial buildings in the background of a picture showing Africans in a small market town. By this deletion of an existing French setting, Moreau said Fortier intended to "exoticise" Africans.

One of Fortier's portraits shows the Muslim cleric, founder of the Wassoulou Empire and military strategist against French colonial rule Samory Touré after having been captured, holding a Quran in his hands. This photograph has been reproduced various times in books, articles, postal stamps and even record covers, making it an iconic image of African resistance against colonial rule. Another notable African leader portrayed by Fortier was the son of El Hadj Omar, Aguibou Tall.

As Pablo Picasso owned about 40 photographs by Fortier and other images of African women, influences by these photographs on his 1907 painting Les Demoiselles d'Avignon have been proposed. Thus, scholar Janie Cohen posited "a framework for its final composition, specific poses, elements that contributed to his [Picasso's] nascent interest in simultaneous multiple perspectives."

As a conclusion of her study of Fortier and his legacy, Moreau wrote in 2018:

He was a very talented photographer and editor, interested in documenting African culture as an amateur ethnologist. His sympathy and respect for Africans emerge from his oeuvre. At the same time, as a man of his era, he used his position as a European, and probably a little bribery, to take pornographic photographs of African girls.

— Daniela Moreau, Edmond Fortier (1862–1928): Photographer, Documentarian and Creator of Stereotypes in West Africa

=== Fortier photographs in public collections ===
The Metropolitan Museum of Art collection includes a gelatin silver print, showing a studio portrait of a young African man in traditional dress. Further, the museum owns photomechanical reproductions of postcards titled Afrique Occidentale – Danseurs "Miniankas" and West Africa, young Wolof girls. Further, the Smithsonian Institution and the Museum of Fine Art, Boston, hold images by Fortier in their collections. The Library of Congress also has photographs by Fortier in their Africana Historic Postcard Collection. In France, the Musée Picasso has 40 photographs by Fortier from the artist's private collection, and the Centre Edmond Fortier and the Association Images & Mémoires have published his work and a complete catalogue online.

== Gallery ==
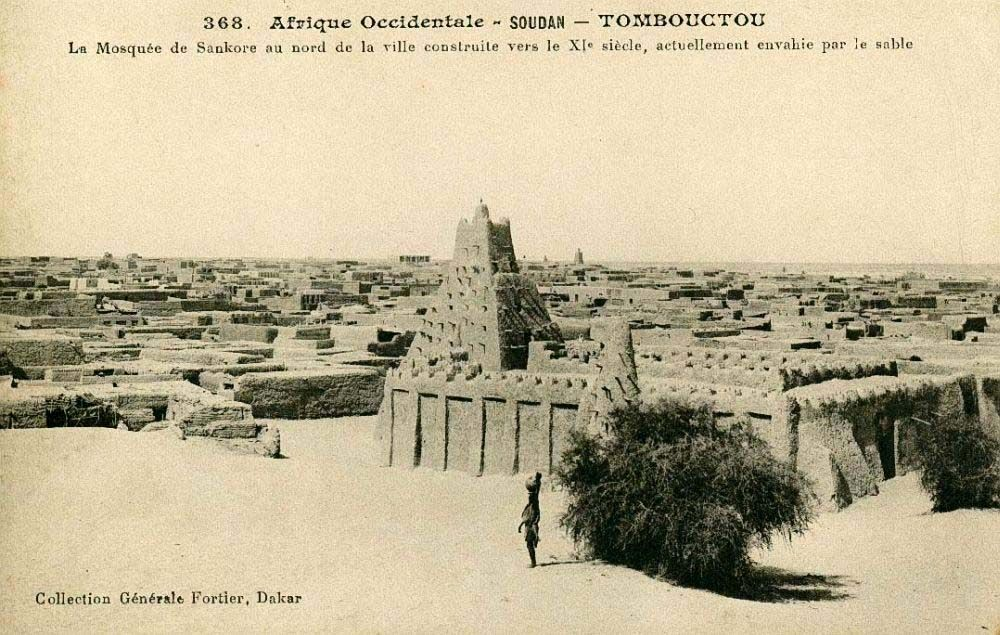
Sankoré Mosque, Tombouctu, c. 1906

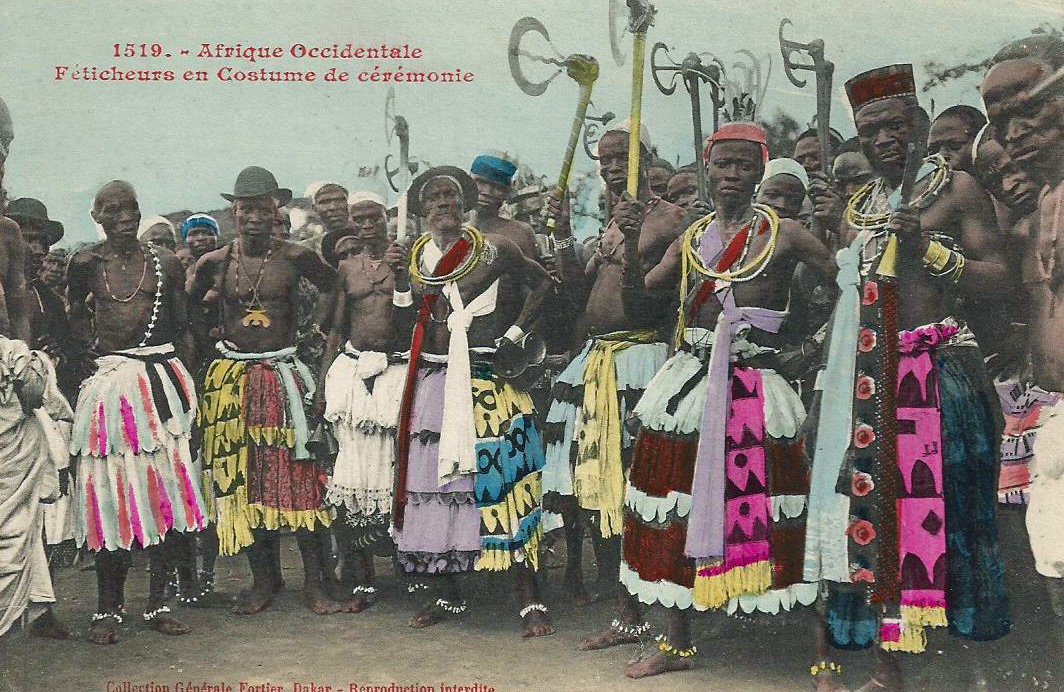
Féticheurs in ceremonial costume, hand-coloured

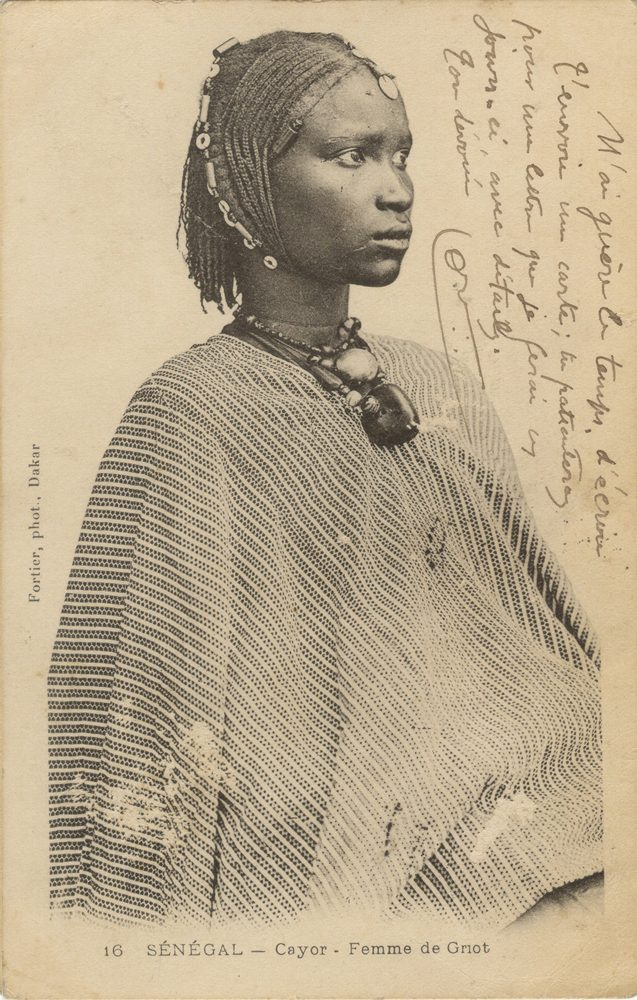
Wife of a West African griot

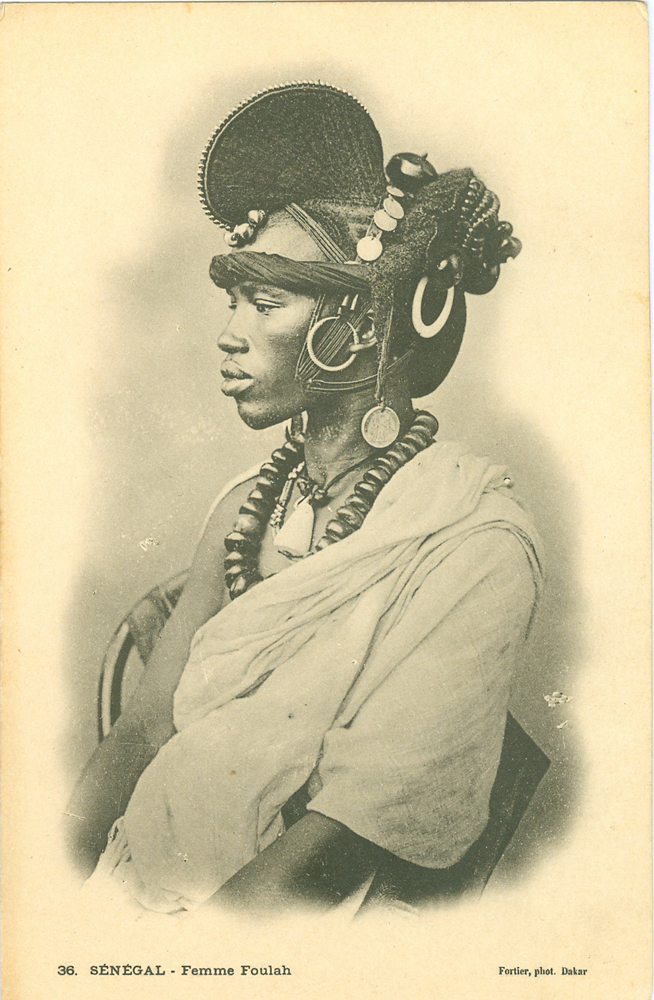
Woman from the Fula ethnic group

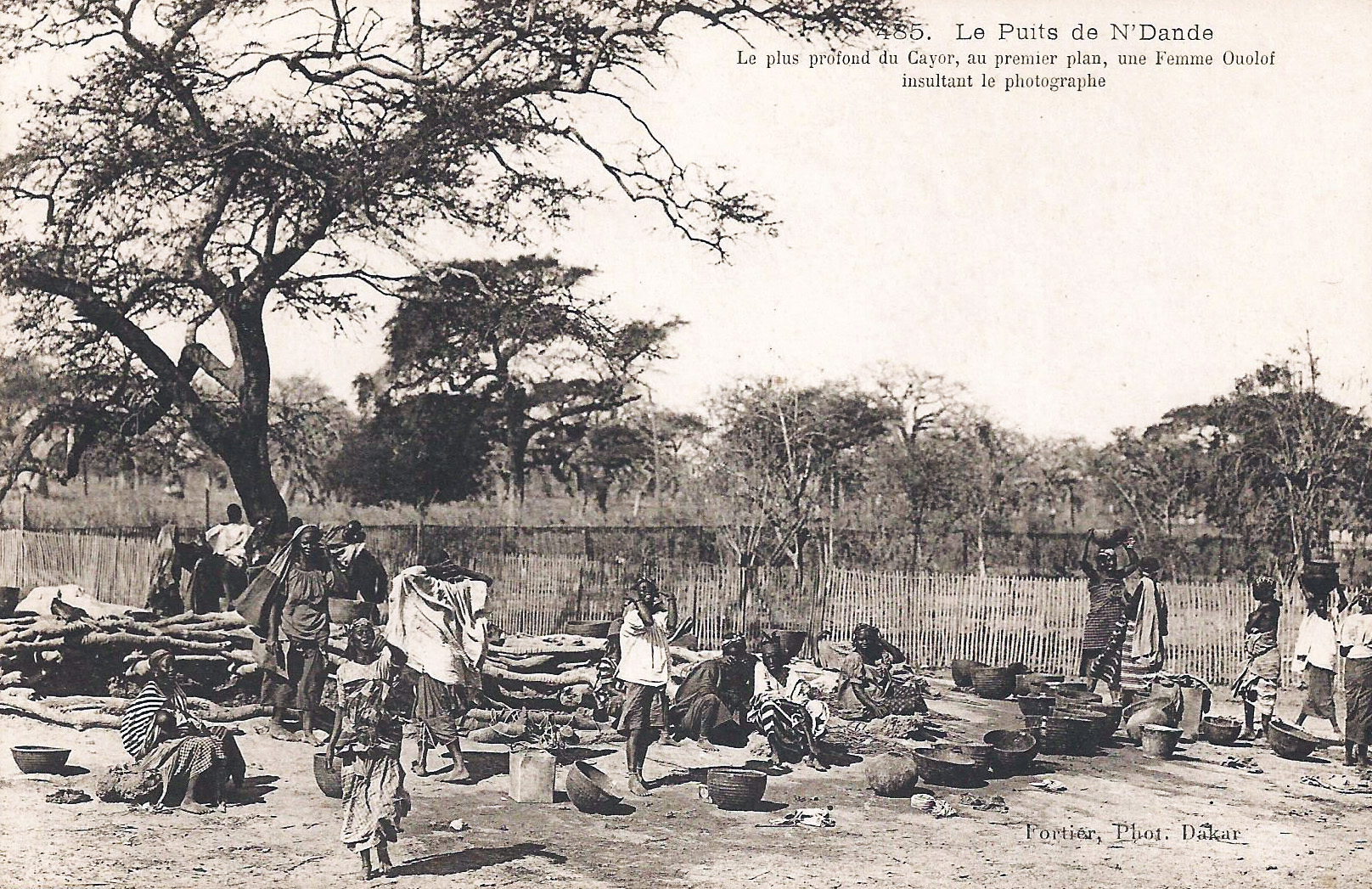
The well of N'Dande, the deepest of Cayor

== See also ==
- Édouard Foà
- Casimir Zagourski
- Jean Geiser
