= Fabrice d'Almeida =

French historian (born 1963)

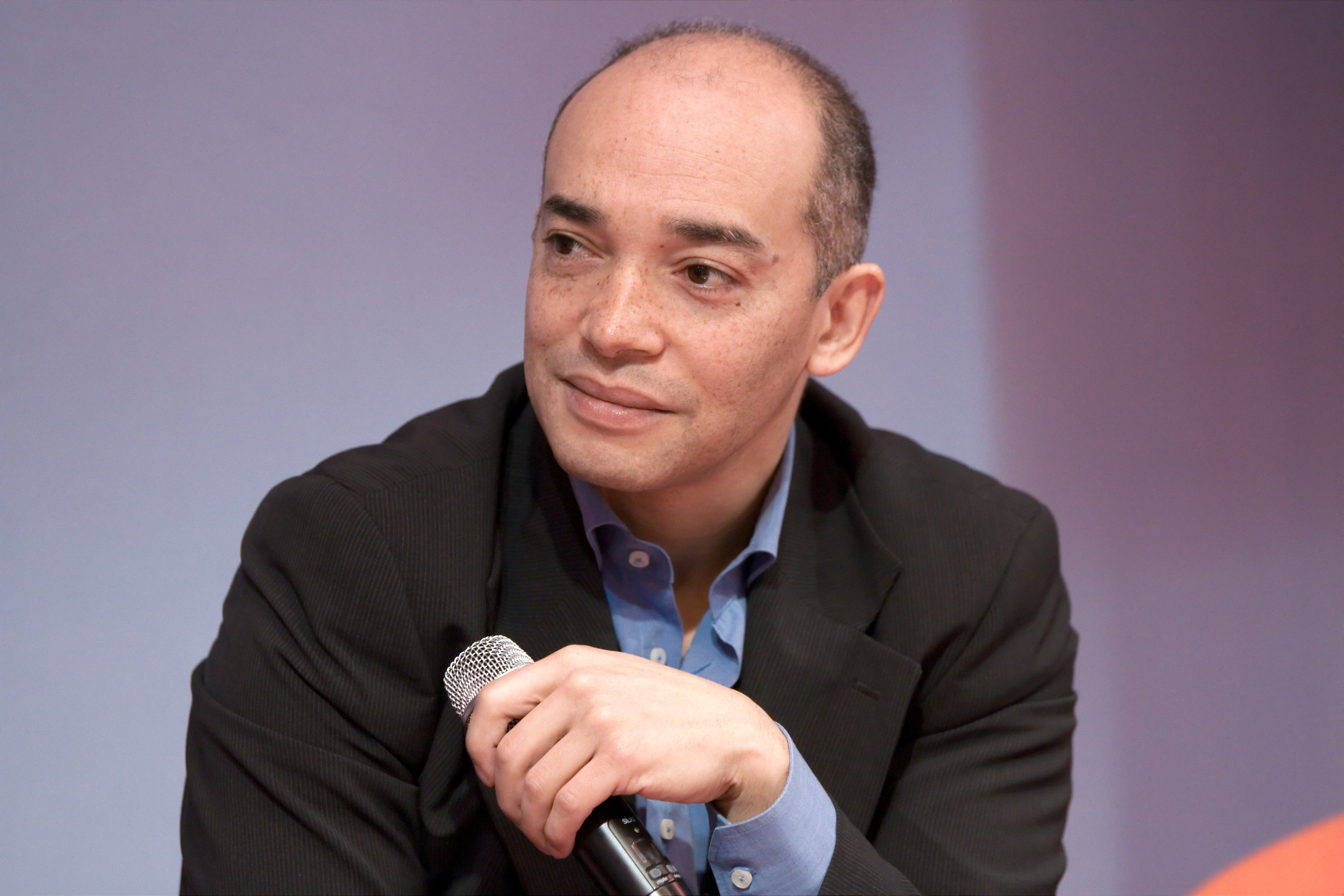
- Born: 15 November 1963 (age 62); Ajaccio, France
- Education: Sorbonne; Sciences Po
- Occupations: Historian; Television personality

Fabrice d'Almeida (born 15 November 1963) is a French historian, whose work focuses on the history of the media, image propaganda and manipulation.

== Biography ==
d'Almeida was born in November 1963 in Ajaccio, the son of academic Hélène d'Almeida-Topor.

After receiving his master's degree from the Sorbonne and Sciences Po, he completed a Ph.D at the Paris West University Nanterre La Défense. As a fellow of the École française de Rome, he initiated the study of socialism in France and Italy, becoming one of the first comparative historians in France. He was invited to the TU-Berlin in Germany as a guest professor as the recipient of the Alexander von Humboldt fellowship, under the supervision of Jürgen Kocka and Harmut Kaelble (ZVGE). D'Almeida also spent two years in Berlin at the Marc Bloch Center.

Upon his return to Paris he was promoted to director of the Institut d'histoire du temps présent (IHTP CNRS) and was then elected to be full professor at Panthéon-Assas University. He is now the director of Master Media and Globalization at the University. He was appointed publisher at Albin Michel in January 2015.

His work with Antony Rowley, Et si on refaisait l’histoire ? is a reflection on French history. It was one of the first "What-If?" genre histories in France.

d'Almeida's work has also formed the basis for several documentaries and TV films, such as "Love, Hate, and Propaganda." (CBC-Toronto)

His book High Society Under the Third Reich is a systematic study using unpublished archival material, private diaries and diplomatic documents to explore the relationship between German high society and the Nazis. His most recently published book in France focused on the management of the SS concentration camp guards.

== Works ==
- Pleasure and Power in Nazi Germany, edited with Pamela E. Swett and Corey Ross, Palgrave-Macmillan, New York, 2011, 308 p. (ISBN 978-0-230-27168-5 (Harback))
- High Society in the Third Reich, Trade paperback Cambridge, Polity Press, 2009 (ISBN 0745643124).
- (in French) Images et propagande, Casterman, coll. « xxe siècle » (n° 18), Paris, et Giunti, Florence, 1995, 191 p. (ISBN 2-203-61019-0)
- (in French) Histoire et politique, en France et en Italie : L'exemple des socialistes, 1945–1983, préf. Gaetan° Arfé, École française de Rome, coll. « Bibliothèque des Écoles françaises d'Athènes et de Rome » (n° 302), Rome, diff. de Boccard, 1998, 629 p. (ISBN 2-7283-0528-5)
- (in French) La Manipulation, PUF, coll. « Que sais-je ? » (n° 3665), Paris, 2003, 128 p. (ISBN 2-13-053332-9); reprint 2005 (ISBN 2-13-055202-1); reprint 2011 (ISBN 2-13-058842-5)
- (in French) Histoire des médias en France : De la Grande Guerre à nos jours, with Christian Delporte, Flammarion, coll. « Champs » (n° 3029) / « Université / Histoire », 2003, 434 p., Paris (ISBN 2-08-083029-5); reprint coll. « Champs » (n° 959) / « Histoire », 2010, 510 p. (ISBN 978-2-08-123770-4)
- (in French) La Vie Mondaine sous le Nazisme, Perrin, Paris, 2006, 418 p. (ISBN 2-262-02162-7); reprint coll. « Tempus » (n° 210), 2008, 529 p. (ISBN 978-2-262-02828-2); trad. Steven Rendall, High Society in the Third Reich, Polity, Cambridge, 2008, 294 p. (ISBN 978-0-7456-4311-3 et 978-0-7456-4312-0)
- (in French) Brève Histoire du xxie siècle, Perrin, Paris, 2007, 174 p. (ISBN 978-2-262-02707-0)
- (in French) La Politique au Naturel : Comportement des hommes politiques et représentations publiques en France et en Italie du xixe au xxie siècle, École française de Rome, coll. « Collection de l'École Française de Rome » (n° 388), Rome, diff. de Boccard, 2007, 525 p. (ISBN 978-2-7283-0606-0)
- (in French) Et si on Refaisait l'Histoire ?, with Anthony Rowley, Odile Jacob, Paris, 2009, 222 p. (ISBN 978-2-7381-2166-0)
- (in French) Ressources Inhumaines. Les Gardiens de Camps de Concentration et leurs Loisirs, Fayard, Paris, 2011, 264 p.(ISBN 2213661782)
- (in French) Sur la trace des serial killers. À chaque époque son tueur, with Marjorie Philibert, Éditions de la Martinière, 2015, 212 p.
