= Jean-Baptiste Alary =

French photographer (1811–1899)

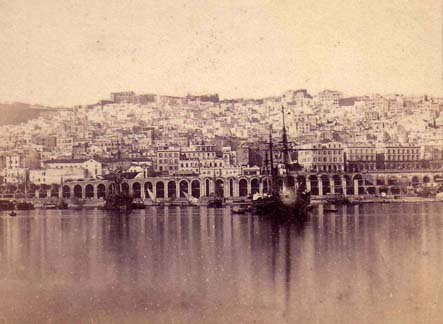
- Construction of the Boulevard de l'Impératrice (1863) in Algiers.
- Born: 20 April 1811; Villeneuve-sur-Lot, France
- Died: 11 March 1899 (aged 87); Saint-Jean-de-Duras, France
- Citizenship: French
- Occupation: Photographer
- Years active: 1855 – 1868
- Known for: Early daguerreotypes and documentary images of French Algeria

Jean-Baptiste Antoine Alary, also known as Antoine Alary, was a French photographer and one of the earliest professional photographers to settle in French Algeria. He produced some of the earliest daguerreotype images in Algeria. Further, he became known for his panoramas of Algiers, as well as for documentary photos of people and places in Algeria, Tunisia and Morocco.

His images have been collected by the National Library of France and the Société française de photographie in Paris, the George Eastman Museum, Rochester and the Getty Research Institute, Los Angeles.

== Biography ==
Initially a primary school teacher in Dausse in the French department of Lot-et-Garonne, Alary moved to the French colony in Algeria in 1847 to work as a framer and gilder. There he met a daguerreotypist named Louis Joseph Delemotte. Delemotte, an established daguerreotypist in Algiers, introduced him to photographic techniques. Delemotte was born in Lille in 1801, but very few of his works are known, apart from three daguerreotypes signed as Delemotte & Alary of 1850. They are the earliest existing daguerreotypes of Algeria and part of the George Eastman Museum's collection.

Alary continued his photographic work in his own studio in Algiers, producing paper negatives and later albumen prints using the wet-plate collodion process. Several of his views circulated in France through the photographer Charles Marville, who added his own stamp to the photographs. In 1854 or 1855, Alary went into partnership with Julie Geiser, the widow of a Swiss watchmaker, and they opened a photography studio known as "Alary & Geiser" until 1868.

Alary made a name for himself at the Société française de photographie exhibition in 1857 with a two-metre grand panorama of the port of Algiers, composed by joining eight individual collodion prints. Works by Alary & Geiser were also exhibited in Bern in 1857 under the name of Julie Geiser. The exhibition featured the "Grand panorama of Algiers" and 18 prints of various sizes, depicting people, landscapes and buildings. In 1858, Alary exhibited views of Algeria at the Photographic Society of London, including the eight-part panorama and a view of the throne room of the Palais du Luxembourg.

Following the success of Félix-Jacques Moulin's collection of photographs from Algeria, Alary undertook a series of journeys between 1857 and 1867 to different regions of Algeria, as well as to Tunisia and Morocco. He built up a collection of over two thousand photographs, the importance of which he praised in the Algerian press of the time. In 1868, Alary handed the studio over to Julie Geiser's two eldest sons, who continued under the name "Geiser frères successeurs".

Alary also took documentary photos of historical Berber and Roman monuments, mosques and important buildings in Algiers, Constantine and Médéa. Photos taken by Alary & Geiser were used in the illustrated press of the time, including scenes from colonial life, French emperor Napoleon III's visit to Algeria in 1865 and the destruction following an earthquake in 1867.

== Works in public collections ==
- Bibliothèque nationale de France, Paris
- Musée d'Orsay, Paris
- Société française de photographie, Paris
- George Eastman Museum, Rochester, New York
- Getty Research Institute, Los Angeles, California

== Gallery ==
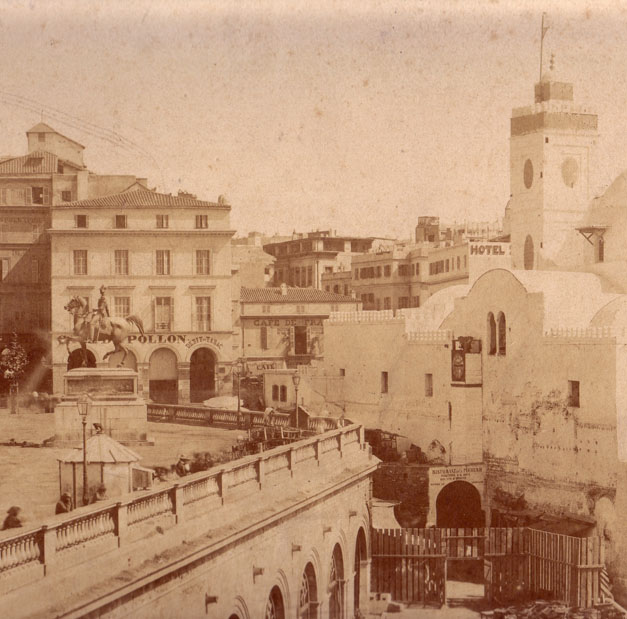
View of Algiers, 1857.

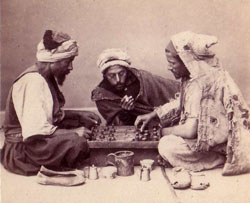
Chess players, 1859.

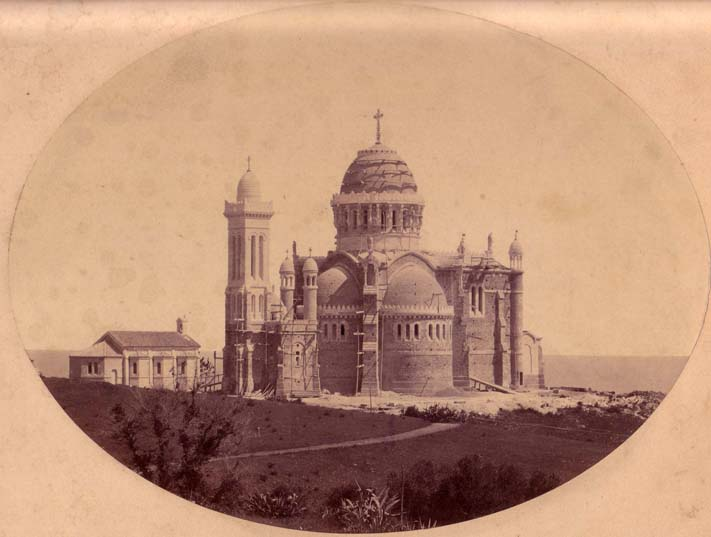
Basilique Notre-Dame-d'Afrique at Bologhine under construction, c. 1860.

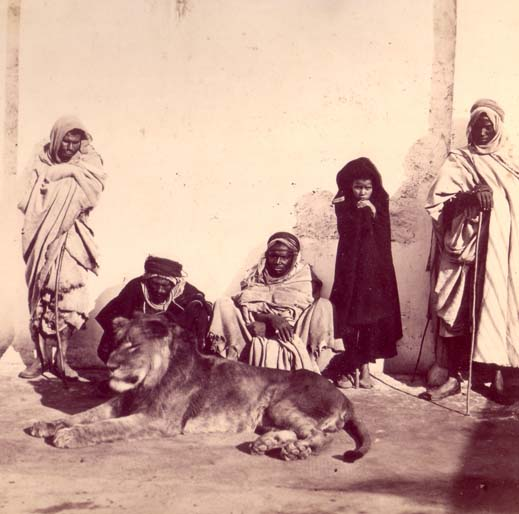
The lion of the marabout, 1864.

== See also ==
- Auguste Maure
- Jean Geiser

== Literature ==
- Marie-Claire Adès; Zaragozi, Pierre (1999). Photographes en Algérie au 19th century (in French). Paris: Musée-galerie de la Seita. ISBN 2-906524-73-5.
- Janet E. Buerger (1989). French daguerreotypes. University of Chicago Press.
- Humbert, Jean-Charles; Humbert, Marie-Noëlle (2022). Antoine Alary: enquête sur un photographe: Algérie 1850-1868 (in French). Paris: L'Harmattan. ISBN 978-2-14-020829-4.
- Michel Megnin (2007). La Photo-carte en Algérie au 19th century (in French). Paris/Alger: Non-Lieu/Edif 2000.
- Terpak, Frances (2009). "The Promise and Power of New Technologies: Nineteenth Century Algiers". In Çelik, Zeynep (ed.). In the Walls of Algiers. Narratives of the city through text and image. Seattle and London: Getty Research Institute, University of Washington Press.
- Pierre Zaragozi (2019). Alary & Geiser, la saga d'un studio photographique (1850-1883) (in French). Paris. ISBN 978-2-9549532-2-9.
