= Hélène d'Almeida-Topor =

French historian and scholar (1932–2020)

- Born: 2 October 1932; Paris, France
- Died: 1 August 2020 (aged 87); Paris, France
- Occupations: Historian; Professor

Hélène d'Almeida-Topor (2 October 1932 – 1 August 2020) was a French historian and university professor of contemporary history.

== Biography ==
Her father, Abram Topor, was a French artist of Polish origin who studied at the Academy of Fine Arts in Warsaw. Her brother, Roland Topor, was also an artist and a writer. Earning an agrégation in history and geography in 1959, d'Almeida-Topor taught in Porto-Novo, Benin from 1960 to 1970. She also taught in Lomé, Togo for several years. Subsequently, she became a lecturer at Paris-Est Créteil University. In 1987, d'Almeida-Topor defended a thesis titled "Histoire économique du Dahomey (1890-1920)" at Paris-Sorbonne University under the supervision of Jean Ganiage. She was a professor at the University of Lorraine from 1988 to 1994 before working at University of Paris 1 Pantheon-Sorbonne until 2003, when she became professor emeritus. Her son, Fabrice d'Almeida, would also become a historian.

Hélène d'Almeida-Topor died on 1 August 2020 at the age of 87.

== Publications ==
- Les Amazones. Une armée de femmes dans l'Afrique précoloniale (1984)
- Les Transports en Afrique xixe – xxe siècle (1992)
- L'Afrique au xxe siècle (1993)
- L'Europe et l'Afrique, un siècle d'échanges économiques (1994)
- Histoire économique du Dahomey. 1890-1920 (1995)
- Le travail en Afrique noire. Représentations et pratiques à l'époque contemporaine (2003)
- Le Goût de l'étranger, les saveurs venues d'ailleurs depuis la fin du xviiie siècle (2006)
- L'Afrique (2006)
- L'Afrique du 20e siècle à nos jours (2013)

== Distinction ==
- President of the Société française d’histoire des outre-mers, Honorary President in 2011
