= Jean Geiser =

Swiss photographer (1848–1923)

- Born: 7 April 1848; La Chaux-de-Fonds, Switzerland
- Died: 7 September 1923 (aged 75); Algiers, French Algeria
- Occupation(s): Photographer and publisher of postcards
- Years active: 1868 – c. 1920
- Known for: Documentary and Orientalist photographs of North Africa

Jean Théophile Geiser (7 April 1848 – 7 September 1923) was a Swiss photographer primarily active in French Algeria, the French protectorate in Morocco, and the French protectorate of Tunisia. He is known for his portraits, Orientalist images and 19th-century picture postcards of North Africa.

His images have been collected by the National Library of France, the Getty Museum and the Victoria & Albert Museum.

== Biography ==
Geiser was born in 1848 in the French-speaking region of Switzerland, but was professionally active in North Africa. He mainly worked in Algiers, the capital of the former colony of French Algeria, where he grew up. In 1850, his parents moved to Algiers with Jean and his brothers. After the early death of his father, Geiser apprenticed as a photographer at the studio of Jean-Baptiste Alary & Geiser, where his mother Julie was a partner. When his brother James Geiser later joined the business, it became known as Geiser Frères. In 1874, he took the studio and the existing photographic stock over as the sole owner, turning it into a successful photo studio in Bab Azoun in the new colonial neighbourhood of Algiers. Additionally, he ran a branch office in Blida.

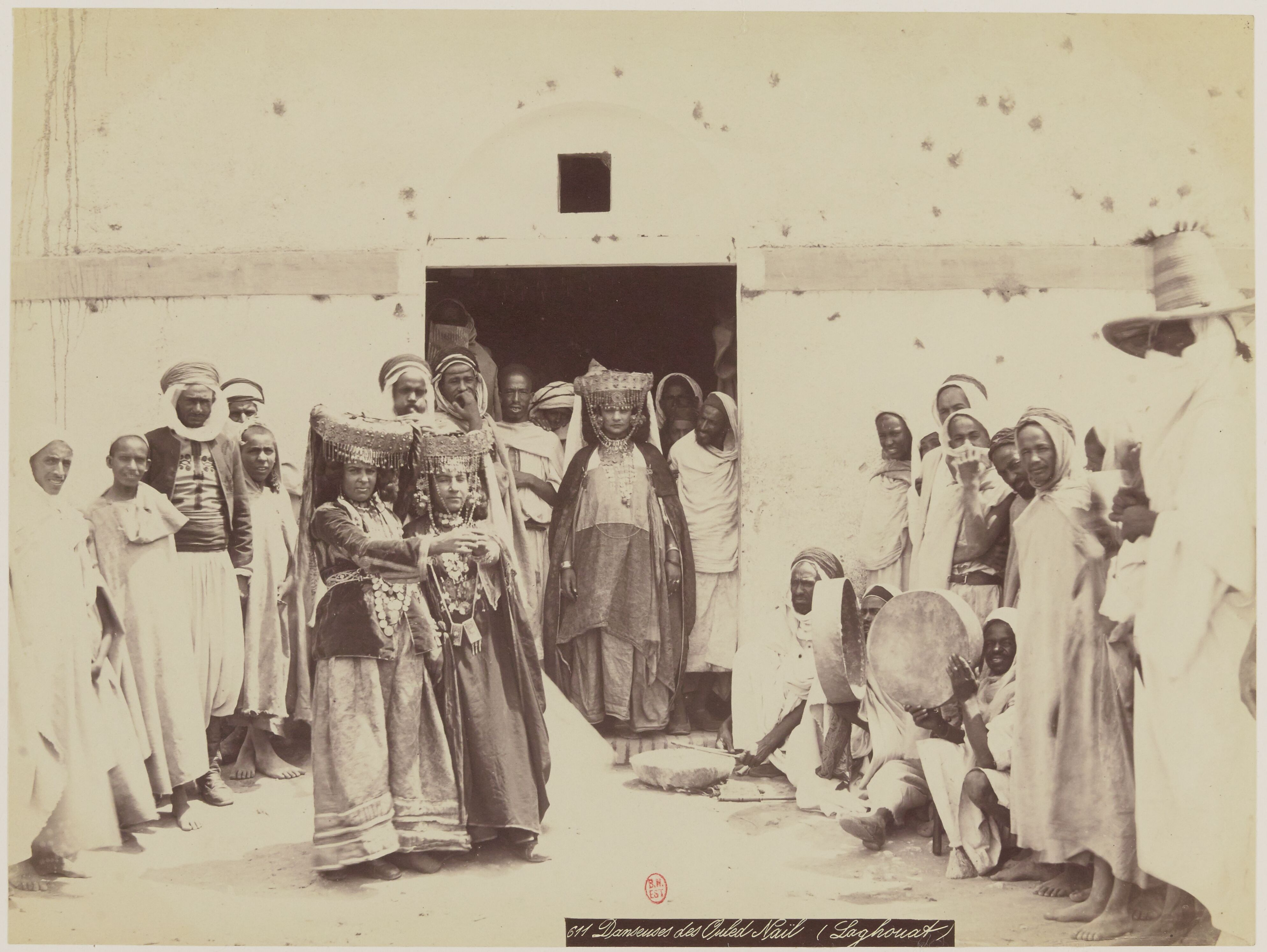
"Types and scenes of Algeria" - Ouled Naïl

Due to his reputation as one of the important photographers in colonial Algeria, Geiser was awarded gold and silver medals at international exhibitions in Lyon (1872), Vienna (1873), Paris (1856, 1878, 1892) and Amsterdam (1883). When French emperor Napoleon III visited Algiers in 1865, Geiser documented the emperor's journey and major events of his visit as one of the official photographers. His large photographic output includes urban views, landscapes, portraits of colonial personalities, ethnic "types" and "scenes", as well as eroticised images of Algerian women. Geiser reproduced many of these as picture postcards around the beginning of the 20th century, when this photographic format became more popular than the earlier cartes de visite.

After approximately 70 years of operation, Geiser sold his family-run studio in late 1921 to photographer Albert Jouve, who took the studio over as Successeur of the Geiser studio.

== Reception ==
=== Scholarly studies ===
In 1981, Algerian writer Malek Alloula discussed Orientalist postcards from colonial Algeria, including many by Geiser, in his book Le Harem colonial, images d’un sous‑érotisme (The Colonial Harem). According to a review in The New York Times, Alloula interpreted these images as expressions of colonial domination and voyeuristic fantasies designed to satisfy French masculine desires. Referring to such staged photographs of Algerian women, Alloula further argued that they projected Orientalist tropes rather than authentic portrayals. In his 2001 illustrated collection Belles Algériennes de Geiser, co-authored with Leyla Belkaïd, Alloula explored Geiser’s portraits of Algerian women, analysing their costumes, jewellery and the colonial male gaze behind these staged images.

Expanding on Alloula's critique of Geiser's work, literary scholar Ali Behdad pointed out that in advertisements and photographs, Geiser called himself a peintre photographe (photographic painter), as he intended to convey an artistic sensibility through his pictures. According to Behdad, in his portrayals of Algerian women, partially nude or dressed in traditional costumes, Geiser employed photographic traditions that evoked well-known Orientalist visual tropes.

In his 2007 book Odalisques and Arabesques: Orientalist Photography 1839–1925 British collector Ken Jacobson suggested that, having existed for roughly 70 years, the Geiser family studio was the longest-lasting photographic enterprise in colonial Algeria. Moreover, from a commercial and artistic point of view, Jacobson judged the Geisers more successful than their competitors.

=== Geiser's work in public collections ===
The National Library of France owns 74 photographic prints on albumen paper and photogravures by Jean Geiser and Alary & Geiser, published between 1850 and 1892. Additionally, the library holds a 1882 general catalogue of Jean Geiser's photographic images. In the Netherlands, the National Maritime Museum also owns turn-of-the-century photographs of ships by Geiser.

In the United States, the Getty Research Institute's Ken and Jenny Jacobson Orientalist Photography Collection possesses both albumen silver prints, cartes de visite, and postcards by Geiser, while the Victoria & Albert Museum in London also owns a carte de visite studio photograph.

== Gallery ==
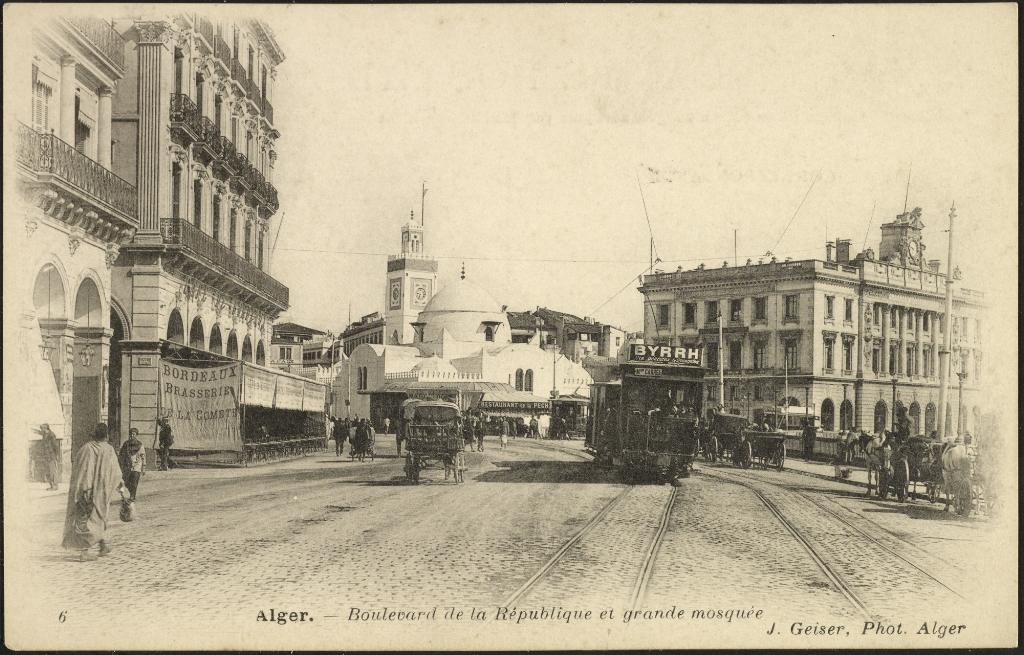
Postcard with city view of Algiers

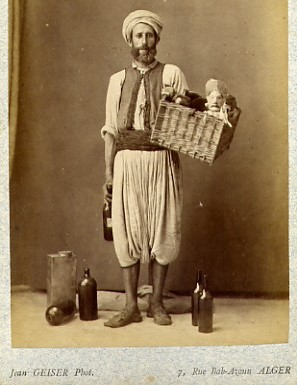
Sorbet seller in Algiers, c. 1880

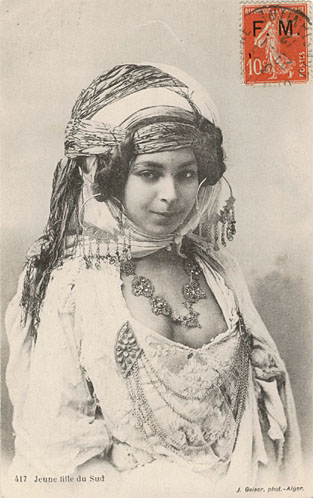
Young woman from the South

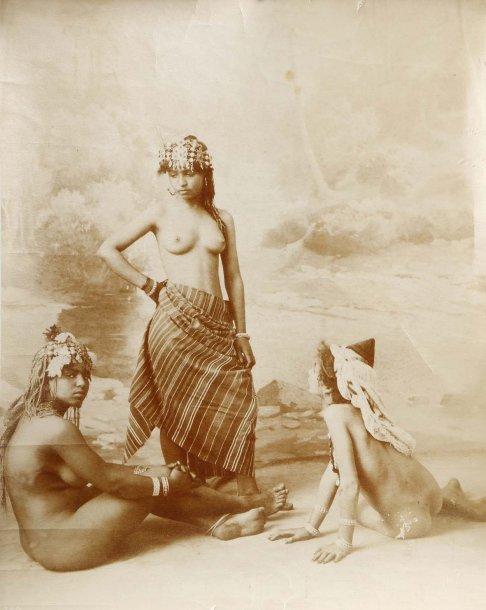
Studio portrait of nudes, c. 1900

== See also ==
- Orientalism
- Nakedness and colonialism
- French postcard
- Auguste Maure
- François-Edmond Fortier
- Casimir Zagourski
