= Casimir Zagourski =

Polish photographer in colonial Central Africa

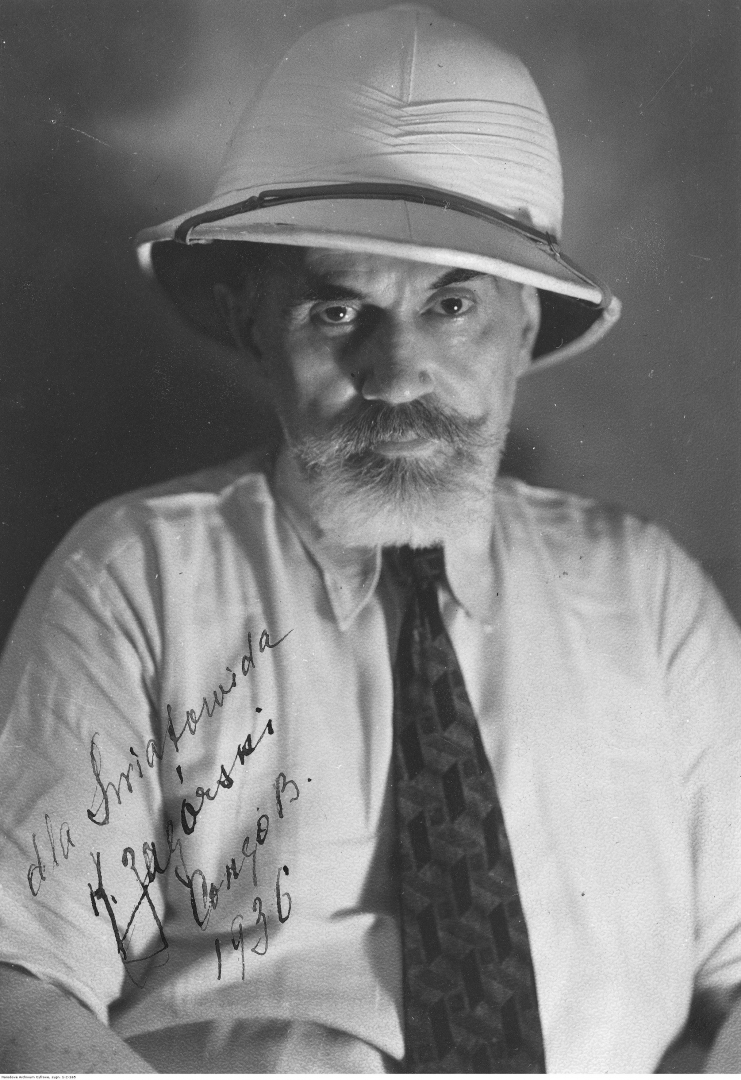
- Zagourski in 1936
- Born: Kazimierz Zagórski; 9 August 1883; Zhytomyr, Russian Empire (now Ukraine)
- Died: 10 January 1944 (aged 60); Léopoldville, Belgian Congo (now Kinshasa, Democratic Republic of Congo)
- Education: Imperial Russian Air Force (aerial intelligence)
- Known for: Photography in Central Africa in the 1920s to 1940s
- Notable work: L'Afrique qui disparaît!

Casimir Ostoja Zagourski (in Polish Kazimierz Zagórski; 9 August 1883 – 10 January 1944) was a Polish former military officer and later photographer of colonial life in Belgian Congo and other Central African regions.

== Life and work ==
Zagourski was born in the city of Zhytomyr in the Russian Empire in 1883. He was Polish, from the noble Clan of Ostoja. Zagourski first served in the Imperial Russian Air Force until the fall of the Russian czar in 1917, rising to the rank of colonel, and then in the Polish military in 1920. During this time, he started with photography, which later would become his profession.

Looking for a new life, he emigrated from Europe in 1924 and settled in Léopoldville, the capital of the former Belgian Congo, where he slightly adapted his name to French spelling and opened a photographic studio. In Léopoldville as well as in other regions of the Belgian and French Congo, he documented colonial life such as the visit of Belgian king Albert I and his wife in 1928. His customers were mainly members of the European expatriate community.

Between 1924 and his death twenty years later, he travelled widely in Central Africa, undertaking expeditions to photograph "disappearing" native African traditions in 1929, 1932, 1935 and 1937. Apart from selling his images to newspapers, he mainly published them as postcards and large prints. In 1937, 60 of his prints in large format were shown at the Belgian pavilion of the Paris World Fair.

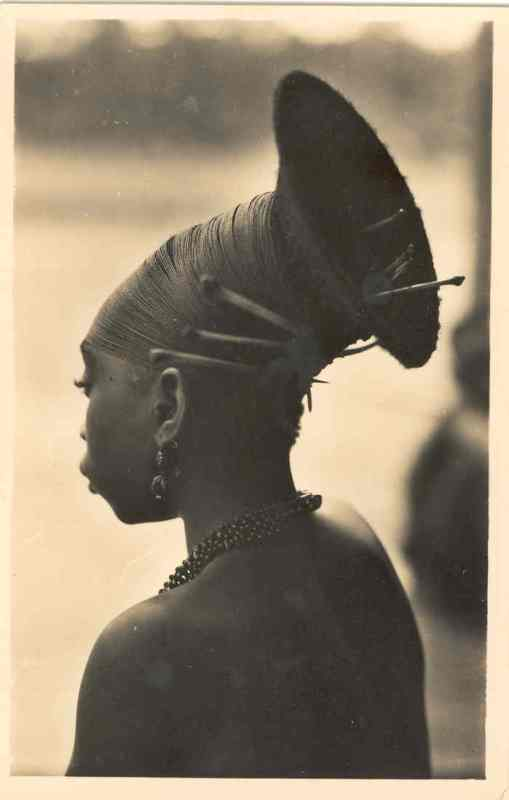
Portrait of a Mangbetu woman

His book L'Afrique qui disparaît! (Lost Africa), with 415 silver gelatin prints on postcard stock, numbered and originally published in leather-bound editions, was later translated into English and Italian and has contributed to his reputation after his lifetime. The photographs in this book were taken in what is now the Democratic Republic of Congo, Uganda, Rwanda, Burundi, Chad, Kenya, Central African Republic, Cameroon, and Congo Brazzaville. Apart from many scenes of everyday life, they include vernacular African architecture, picturesque landscapes, animals and portraits of African men and women, including the Mangbetu people and others.

After his death in Léopoldville in 1944, his nephew Marian Zagórski continued the studio, selling and republishing his uncle's images until 1976.

== Reception ==
Cultural anthropologist Christraud M. Geary included several of Zagourski's images in her book Postcards from Africa: Photographers of the Colonial Era and called him "one of the most accomplished and well-known photographer-publishers" in late-colonial Africa. Referring to his portrait of a Mangbetu woman with traditional hairstyle, Geary pointed out pictorialist lighting and depth of focus, which was different from his usual modernist documentary style.

The Eliot Elisofon Photographic Archives at the National Museum of African Art praised L'Afrique qui disparaît! for the "superb technique and great sensitivity" of Zagourski's portraits of Africans. And although being an example of anthropological photography, the images "evoke a sense of closeness and empathy", shaping "the public's image of central Africa for many years to come."

=== Photographs in public and private collections ===
In Europe, the National Library of Poland presents more than 150 of Zagourski's images in their online collection. In Geneva, Switzerland, the Ethnographic Museum received a copy with 420 original postcards of L'Afrique disparue in 2015. Further, the National Museum of World Cultures in the Netherlands and the collection of the city of Antwerp, Belgium, have collections of Zagourski's images. Further, the State Archives of Belgium possess 415 negatives and postcards, along with official and personal documents from Zagourski's estate.

In the US, Yale University Library holds about 250 of his images in their African postcard collection. Further, negatives, hundreds of postcards and black-and-white prints of his images have been collected by the Eliot Elisofon Photographic Archives at the National Museum of African Art. In 2002/2003, Zagourski's photos were shown in the National Museum of African Art's exhibition In and Out of Focus: Images from Central Africa, 1885–1960. Another exhibition was presented at the Maison de la Photographie in Marrakesh. - Privately held copies of Zagourski's L'Afrique qui disparait have also been sold by Sotheby's and other auction houses.

== Publications ==
- Pierre Loos and Ezio Bassani (eds.) (2001). Zagourski, L'Afrique disparue. Paris: Skira-Seuil. ISBN 978-8884910073. (in French)
  - Pierre Loos and Ezio Bassani (eds.) (2001). Zagourski: Lost Africa Milan: Skira, ISBN 88-8491-008-0.
  - Pierre Loos and Ezio Bassani (eds.)Zagourski: Africa perduta (2001). Milan: Skira, 2001. ISBN 88-8491-006-4. (in Italian)

== Gallery ==
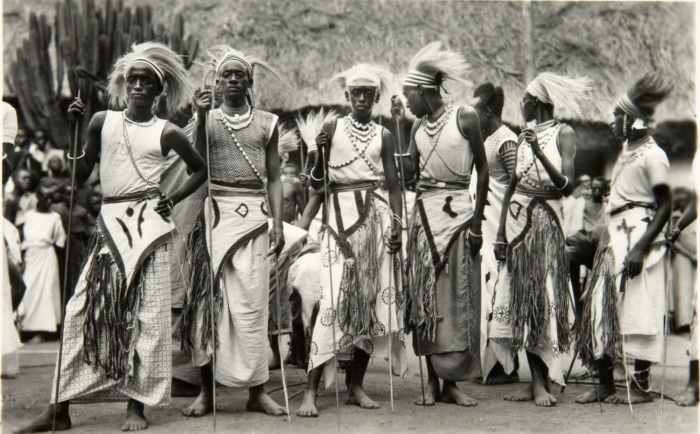

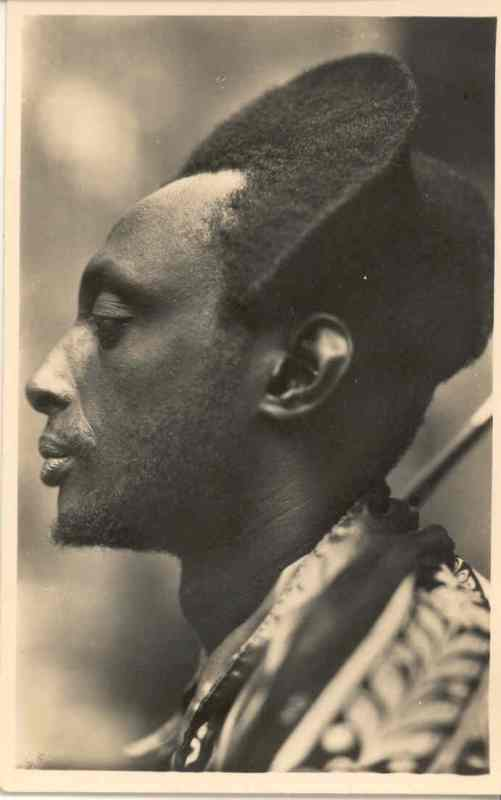

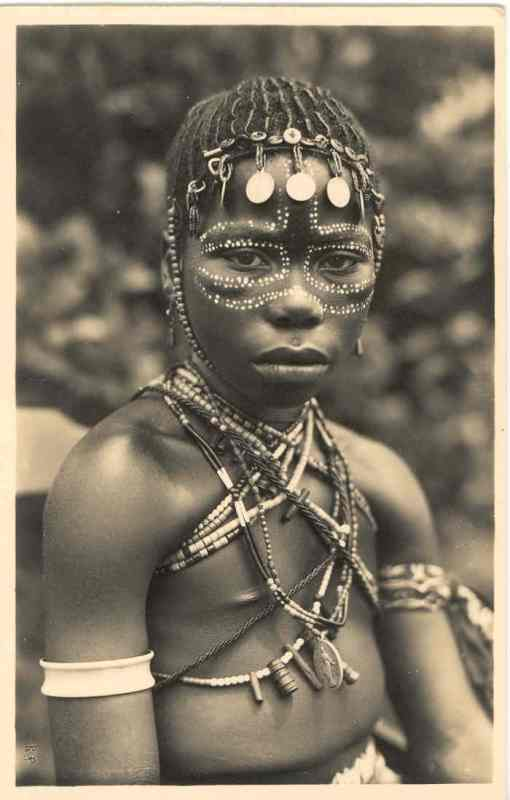

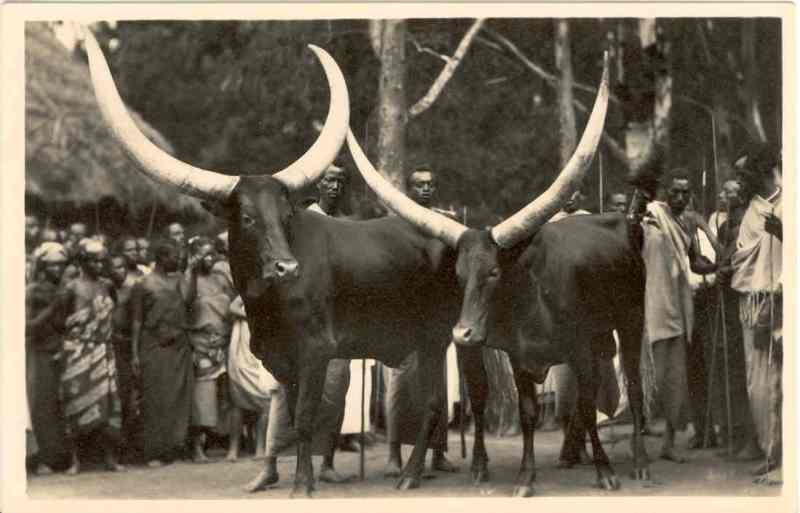

== See also ==
- Ostoja coat of arms
- Clan of Ostoja
- Marcin Szyszkowski
- François-Edmond Fortier
- Édouard Foà
