= Auguste Maure =

French photographer

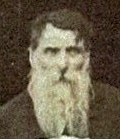
- Born: 4 December 1840; Marseille, France
- Died: 3 March 1907 (aged 66); Biskra, Algeria
- Other name: Joseph Augustin Maure
- Occupation: Photographer
- Known for: Photographs of landscapes and people from South Algeria

Auguste Maure (4 December 1840 – 3 March 1907) was a French 19th-century photographer.

== The "Photographie Saharienne" studio ==
Auguste Maure was an orientalist photographer who lived in Biskra (Algeria) from 1855 to 1907. He created the "Photographie Saharienne" studio in 1860 : the very first photography studio in south Algeria. In the 19th century, Biskra, celebrated as the 'queen of oases,' became a destination for numerous artists (writers, painters, and photographers), who were drawn to its unique climate, exceptional light, and iconic Saharan desert scenery.

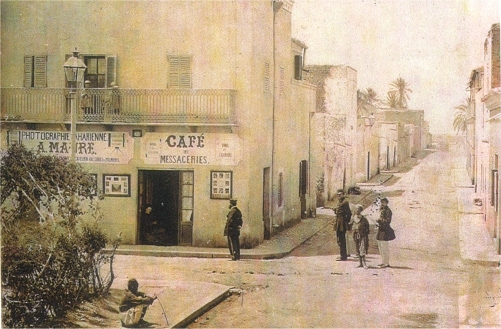
A. Maure studio- "Photographie Saharienne" - Biskra - circ. 1870

== Photographic production ==
Auguste Maure was active from 1860 to 1907 and took many photographs of landscapes and cities of south Algeria (El Kantara, Sidi Okba, Chetma, Tilatou, Tolga, Touggourt ...).

The members of the Ouled Naïl tribe, Berber dancers wearing incomparable costumes and covered by jewels, are often represented on Maure photographs very appreciated by the tourists.

== Gallery ==
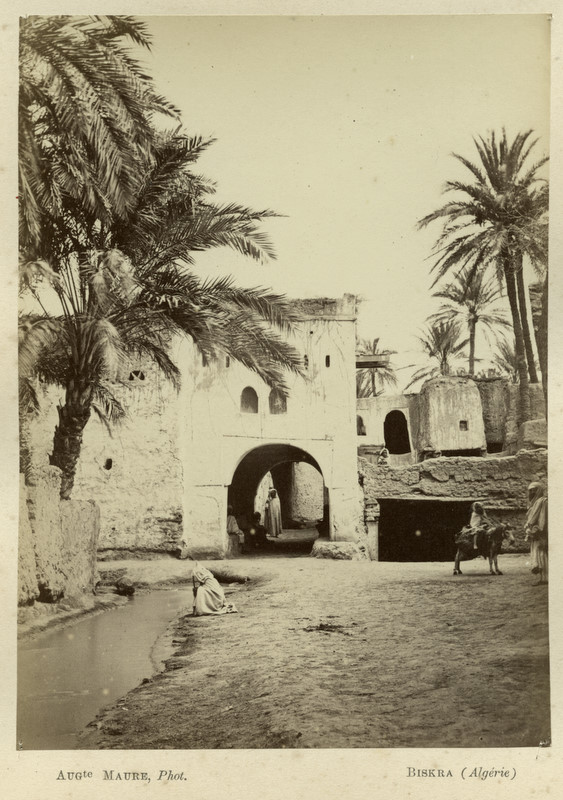
Interior of Biskra - 1870

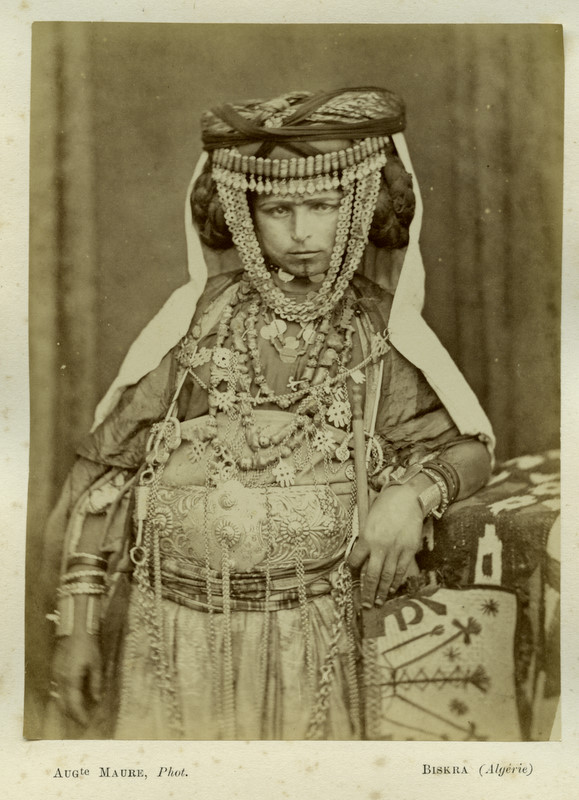
Ouled Naïl - Biskra - 1870

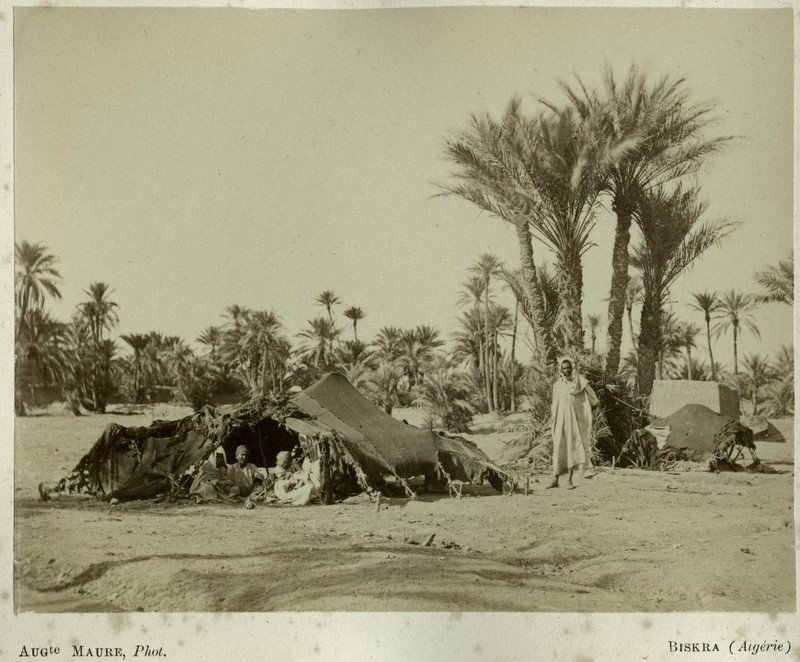
A Bedouin bayt - Biskra - 1880

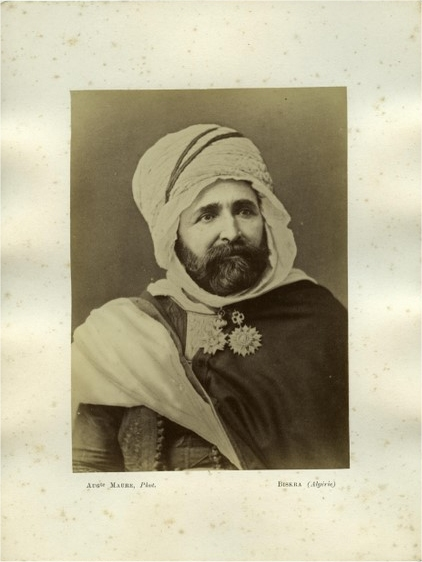
"Si Mohamed Srir Ben Guanah - Biskra Caïd- 1880"

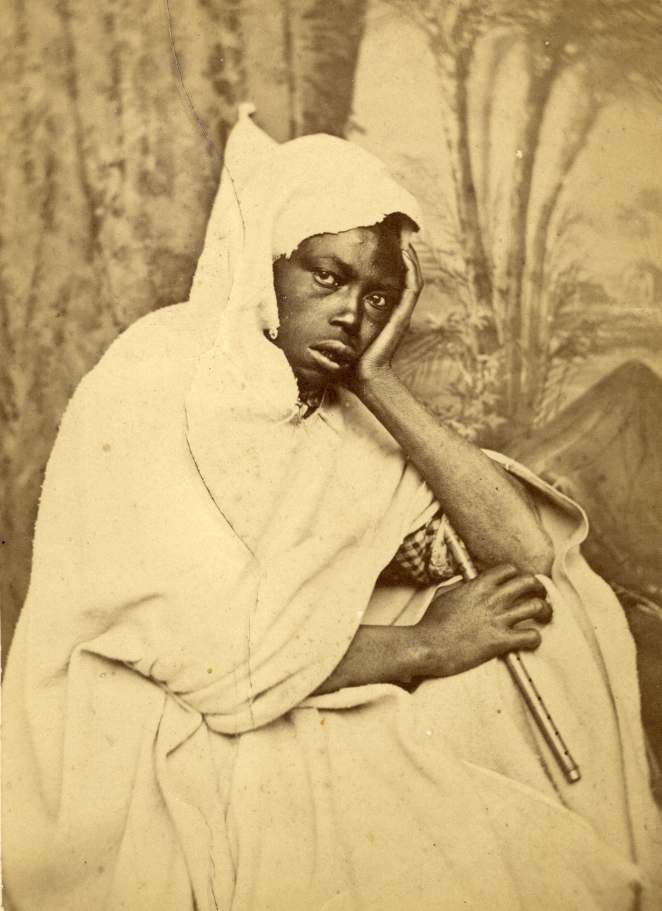
Flute player - Biskra - 1875

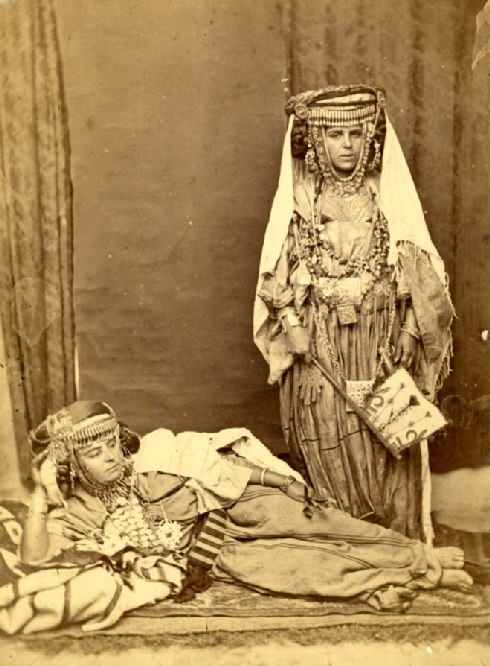
Ouled Naïl - Biskra - 1875

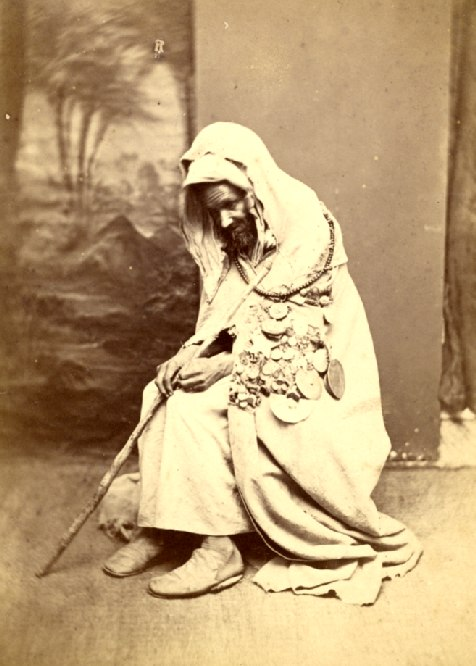
An old Algerian man - Biskra - 1875

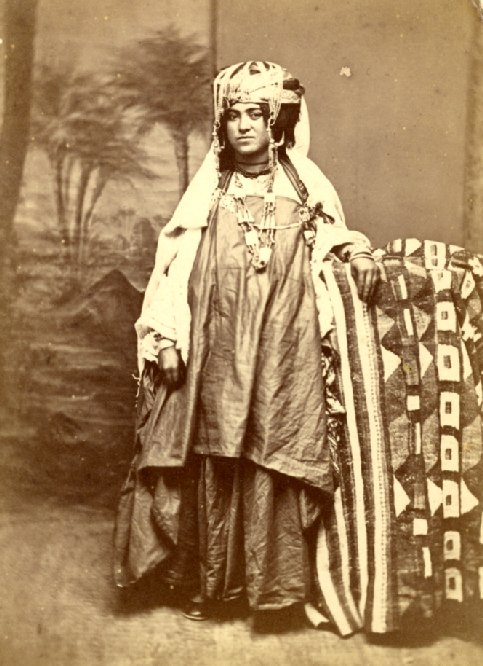
Ouled Naïl - Biskra - 1875

== See also ==
- Orientalism
- List of Orientalist artists
- Jean-Baptiste Alary
- Jean Geiser
