= List of American photojournalists =

This is a list of notable American photojournalists. For photojournalists of other nationalities, see list of photojournalists.

== A ==
- Eddie Adams (photographer)
- Russ Adams (tennis photographer)
- Lynsey Addario
- Tappan Adney
- Lucien Aigner
- Micah Albert
- M.J. Alexander
- William Albert Allard
- Devin Allen
- Ike Altgens
- Stephen Alvarez
- Jeff Antebi
- Tom Arma
- Suzanne Arms
- Eve Arnold
- Kristen Ashburn
- Oliver F. Atkins
- Jane Evelyn Atwood
- George Azar

== B ==
- David Bacon (photojournalist)
- Lester Balog
- Timothy Lee Barnwell
- Charles Barthold
- J. Ross Baughman
- Jessie Tarbox Beals
- Chip Berlet
- Jerry Berndt (photographer)
- Andrew D. Bernstein
- Bill Biggart
- Jack Birns
- Alexander Black (photographer)
- Matt Black (photographer)
- Reid Blackburn
- A. Aubrey Bodine
- Thérèse Bonney
- Karen T. Borchers
- Margaret Bourke-White
- Mathew Brady
- Jerilyn Lee Brandelius
- Jim Brandenburg (photographer)
- Paula Bronstein
- Charlotte Brooks
- Kate Brooks
- Helen Brush Jenkins
- Julien Bryan
- Esther Bubley
- Dan Budnik
- Hal Buell
- Shirley Burden
- David Burnett (photojournalist)
- Susan Burnstine
- Renée C. Byer

== C ==
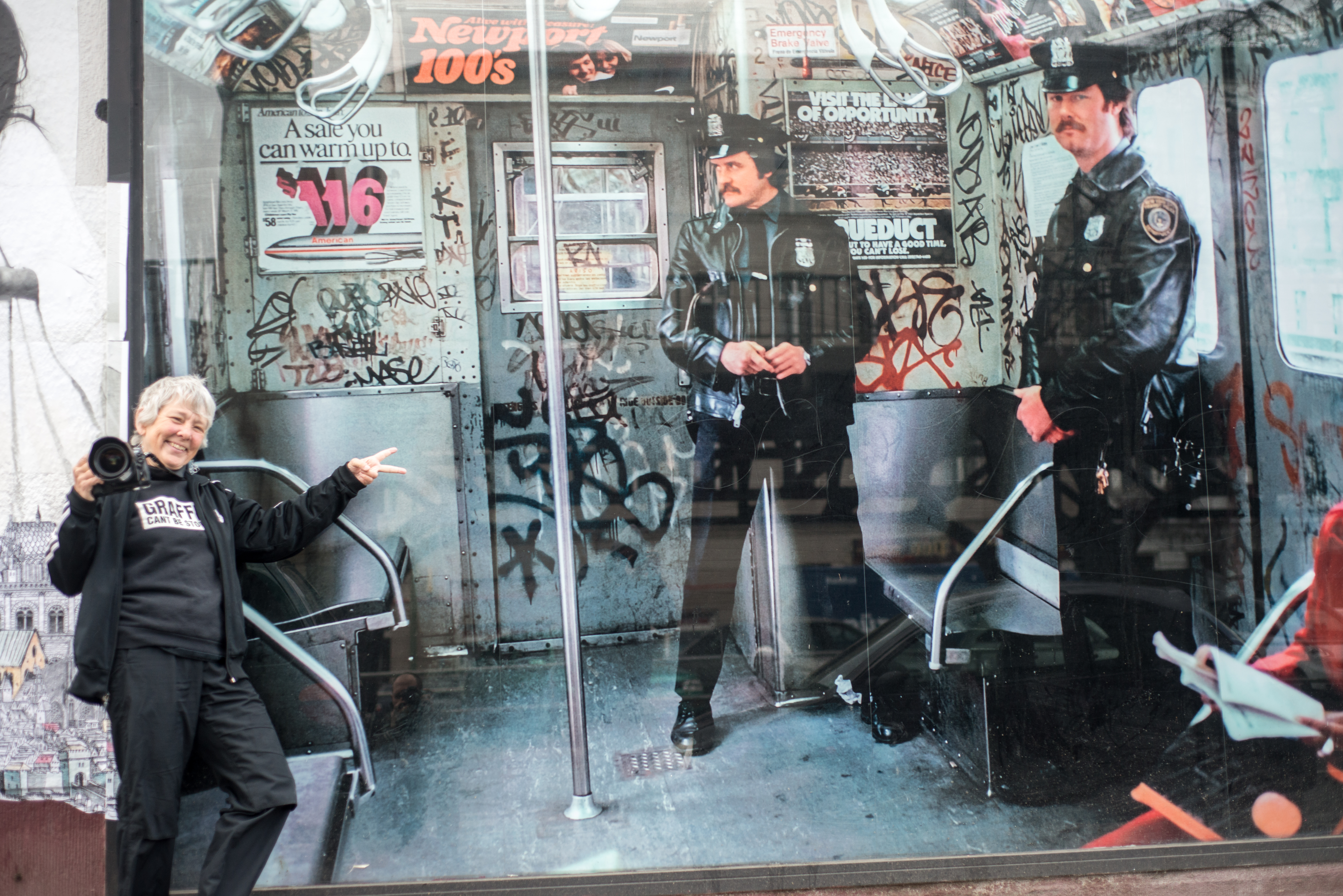
American photojournalist Martha Cooper in front of a Photo-Installation in Berlin, March 2014

- William Campbell (filmmaker)
- Cornell Capa
- Robert Caplin
- Edward Caraballo
- Marion Carpenter
- Virginia de Carvalho
- Dickey Chapelle
- Paul Chesley
- Mary Chind-Willie
- Bettina Cirone
- Carolyn Cole
- Charlie Cole (photographer)
- Marjory Collins
- Jerry Cooke (photographer)
- Martha Cooper
- Deborah Copaken
- Joseph Costa (photographer)
- Kevin P. Coughlin
- Ira Wilmer Counts Jr.
- Jim Cummins (photographer)

== D ==
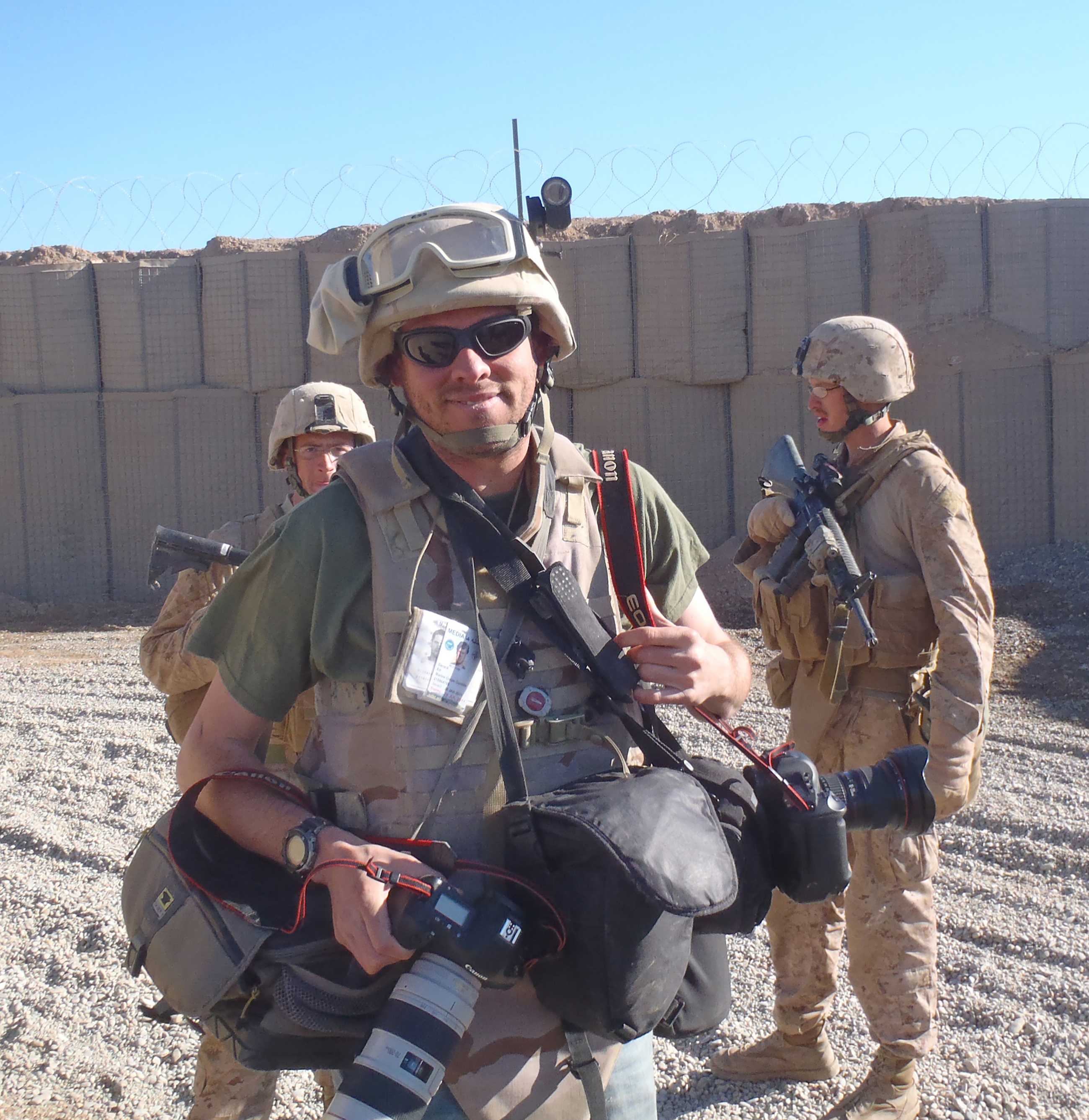
American photojournalist Ed Darack just prior to embarking on a combat operation with U.S. Marines outside of Marjah, Afghanistan

- Ramona d'Viola
- Ed Darack
- Barbara Davidson
- Gerald Davis (photojournalist)
- Myron Davis
- Albert K. Dawson
- Penny De Los Santos
- Lou Dematteis
- Max Desfor
- Sima Diab
- Alan Diaz
- Sheldon Dick
- Jessica Dimmock
- John Dominis
- Richard Drew (photographer)
- Michel du Cille
- Corinne Dufka
- David Douglas Duncan
- Jack Dykinga

== E ==
- Barry Edmonds
- Ronald A. Edmonds
- Clifton C. Edom
- Alfred Eisenstaedt
- Sandra Eisert
- Cynthia Elbaum
- John Engstead
- Bill Eppridge
- Mitch Epstein
- Elliott Erwitt
- Jason Eskenazi
- Frank Espada
- Michael Evans (photographer)
- Walker Evans
- J. R. Eyerman

== F ==
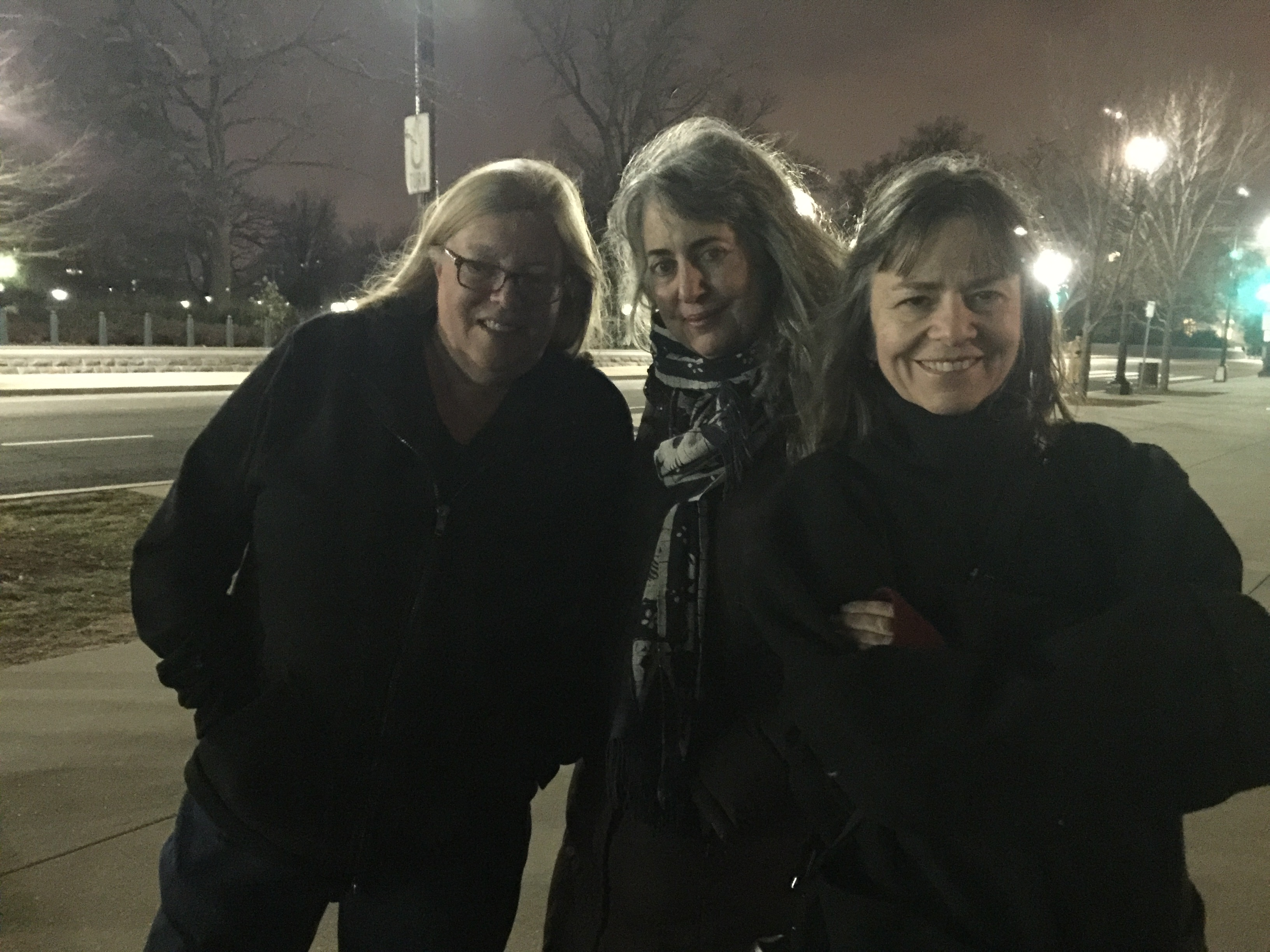
American photojournalist Donna Ferrato (right) and friends documenting Whole Woman's Health v. Hellerstedt

- Warren Faidley
- Gaetano Faillace
- Sharon Farmer
- Patrick Farrell (photojournalist)
- Najlah Feanny
- Donna Ferrato
- John Filo
- Nat Finkelstein
- Deanne Fitzmaurice
- Sean Flynn (photojournalist)
- Bill Foley
- James Foley (journalist)
- Susan Ford
- Harrison Forman
- Stanley Forman
- Michael Forster Rothbart
- Mary Lou Foy
- Thomas E. Franklin
- Leonard Freed
- Ruth Fremson
- Conrad Friberg
- Lawrence Fried
- Jun Fujita
- Paul Fusco (photographer)

== G ==
A portion of the color film taken of the second flag-raising by American photojournalist Bill Genaust, excerpted from the 1945 "Carriers Hit Tokyo" newsreel

- William M. Gallagher
- Preston Gannaway
- Bette Garber
- Clay Geerdes
- Bill Genaust
- Paola Gianturco
- John L. Gihon
- Ashley Gilbertson
- Robert E. Gilka
- Barbara Gluck
- Bob Gomel
- Cork Graham
- Tom Gralish
- Allan Grant
- Clint Grant
- Jennifer Graylock
- Stanley Greene
- Lauren Greenfield
- Lori Grinker
- Bill Groethe
- Stan Grossfeld
- Ruth Gruber
- Chris Gulker
- Carol Guzy

== H ==
- Ernst Haas
- Tara Haelle
- Otto Hagel
- Robert Halmi
- Dirck Halstead
- Jane Hamilton-Merritt
- Charles Harbutt
- Jimmy Hare
- Erich Hartmann (photographer)
- Bill Hatcher
- Hillary Hauser
- Ron Haviv
- Todd Heisler
- Paul Henderson (photojournalist)
- Bob Henriques
- Diana Mara Henry
- Abigail Heyman
- Tyler Hicks
- Wilson Hicks
- John Hoagland
- Benjamin Hoff
- Martha Holmes (photographer)
- Stan Honda
- Chris Hondros
- Tom Howard (photographer)
- Gary L. Howe
- Bill Hudson (photographer)
- Aaron Huey

== I ==
- Walter Iooss
- Polly Irungu

== J ==
- Ted Jackson
- Charles Fenno Jacobs
- Jeff Jacobson (photographer)
- Kenneth Jarecke
- Frances Benjamin Johnston
- Dewitt Jones
- Theodor Jung

== K ==
- Ed Kashi
- Thomas J. Kelly III
- David Hume Kennerly
- André Kertész
- Nikki Kahn
- Brenda Ann Kenneally
- Mell Kilpatrick
- Dallas Kinney
- Helen Johns Kirtland
- Russell Klika
- Heinz Kluetmeier
- Matthew Knisely
- Ed Kolenovsky
- Kim Komenich
- Harry Koundakjian

== L ==
- Kay Lahusen
- Thomas Laird
- Wendy Sue Lamm
- Elliott Landy
- Bettye Lane
- Dorothea Lange
- Erika Langley
- Erika Larsen
- Bud Lee (photographer)
- Russell Lee (photographer)
- Nina Leen
- David Leeson
- Neil Leifer
- Arthur Leipzig
- Catherine Leroy
- Ken Light (photographer)
- Lee Lockwood
- John Loengard
- Rick Loomis (photojournalist)
- Daniel Lorenzetti
- Benjamin Lowy
- Ken Lubas
- Gerd Ludwig
- Danny Lyon

== M ==
- Brad Mangin
- Tom Marcello
- Mary Ellen Mark
- Diana Markosian
- Jim Marshall (photographer)
- Ben Martin (photographer)
- Spider Martin
- Harry Mattison
- Leonard McCombe
- Shane T. McCoy
- Steve McCurry
- Patrick McMullan
- Joe McNally (photographer)
- Susan Meiselas
- Peter Menzel
- Justin Merriman
- Cheryl Diaz Meyer
- Hansel Mieth
- Lee Miller
- Zoriah Miller
- Raúl De Molina
- Charles Moore (photographer)
- José Moré
- Bert Morgan (photojournalist)
- Christopher Morris (photographer)
- John G. Morris
- Ralph Morse
- Carl Mydans

== N ==
- James Nachtwey
- Matthew Naythons
- Roy Neel
- Carol Newsom (photographer)
- Daniel Nicoletta

== O ==
- Joe O'Donnell (photojournalist)
- Bill Owens (photographer)

== P ==
- Gordon Parks
- Marvin Breckinridge Patterson
- Lucian Perkins
- Hy Peskin
- Irving Henry Webster Phillips Sr.
- Arthur Clarence Pillsbury
- Spencer Platt (photographer)
- Alan Pogue
- David Pokress
- Jason Pramas
- Larry C. Price

== R ==
- John Ranard
- Herbert Randall
- I. C. Rapoport
- Steve Raymer
- Eli Reed
- Rita Reed
- Ryan Spencer Reed
- Andrea Star Reese
- Everette Dixie Reese
- Lara Jo Regan
- Ed Rice
- John Rich (war correspondent)
- Eugene Richards
- Robert Riger
- Jacob Riis
- Manuel Rivera-Ortiz
- Ruth Robertson
- Al Rockoff
- Joseph Rodriguez (photographer)
- Samuel Rosenberg (writer)
- Ann Rosener
- Louise Rosskam
- Arthur Rothstein
- Joseph Ruttenberg

== S ==
- Gertrude Samuels
- Dustin Satloff
- Richard Saunders (photographer)
- Herb Scharfman
- Steve Schapiro
- Steve Simon (photographer)
- Michael Schennum
- David Scherman
- Justine Schiavo-Hunt
- Jana Schneider
- Flip Schulke
- Leo Seltzer (filmmaker)
- Robert A. Sengstacke
- David Seymour (photographer)
- Stephen Shames
- Dixie Sheridan
- Stephanie Sinclair
- Brian Skerry
- Moneta Sleet Jr.
- Daniel Wakefield Smith
- Harper B. Smith
- Polly Smith (photographer)
- W. Eugene Smith
- William Snyder (photojournalist)
- Howard Sochurek
- Luke Somers
- Pete Souza
- E. Lee Spence
- Melissa Springer
- Peter Stackpole
- John Stanmeyer
- Sally Stapleton
- Lisl Steiner
- Dana Stone
- Scott Strazzante
- George Strock
- Roy Stryker
- Eric Minh Swenson

== T ==
- Paul Taggart
- Nicholas Teliatnikow
- Bill Thomas (American writer, born 1934)
- Amy Toensing
- Stanley Tretick
- Erin Trieb
- Scout Tufankjian
- David C. Turnley
- Peter Turnley

== U ==
- Neal Ulevich
- Don Ultang
- Burk Uzzle

== V ==
- John Vachon
- Robert Van Lierop
- Paul Vathis
- Priit Vesilind
- Santi Visalli
- Ami Vitale
- Evan Vucci

== W ==
- Craig F. Walker
- Diana Walker
- Brian Walski
- Weegee
- Dan Weiner
- David H. Wells
- John H. White (photojournalist)
- Jeff Widener
- Leigh Wiener
- Clarence Williams (photojournalist)
- Michael Williamson (photographer)
- William George Wilson
- Damon Winter
- Ernest Withers
- Sharon Wohlmuth
- Werner Wolff (photographer)
- Alison Wright (photojournalist)
- Bill Wynne

== Y ==
- Taro Yamasaki
- Boris Yaro

== Z ==
- Walt Zeboski
- Jerome Zerbe

== See also ==
- List of photojournalists (Dynamic list by country of origin)
- Lists of journalists
- List of photographers
- National Press Photographers Association
