= Walski =

Walski is a surname. Notable people with the surname include:

- Brian Walski (born 1958), American photographer
- Michał Walski (born 1997), Polish footballer

== See also ==
- Kowalski (surname)
- Walske
- Wilensky (surname)
- Wolodarsky (surname)
