= J. W. McFarland =

American politician

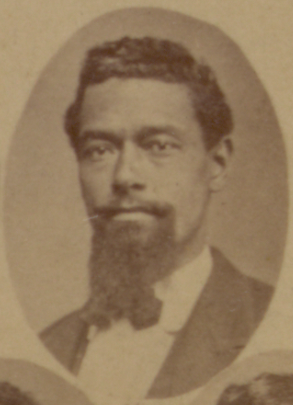

Member of the Mississippi House of Representatives
- In office 1874–1875

Personal details
- Spouse: Mary Birdson (m. 1870)
- Occupation: Politician

J. W. McFarland was a state legislator in Mississippi. He represented Rankin County, Mississippi in the Mississippi House of Representatives in 1874 and 1875.

He married Mary Birdson in 1870. Wilson Hicks also represented the county at that time.

== See also ==
- African American officeholders from the end of the Civil War until before 1900
