= Knisely =

Knisely is a surname. Notable people with the surname include:

- Mary Knisely (born 1959), American middle- and long-distance runner
- Matthew Knisely (born 1974), American photojournalist
- Nicholas Knisely (born 1960), American bishop
- Pete Knisely (1887–1948), American baseball player
