= Literary Rejections On Display =

Literary Rejections On Display is a blog on which featured posts and discussions about rejection letters from magazines, agents and book publishers. The site was founded in 2007 and was run anonymously by a person identifying only as "Writer, Rejected." Entertainment Weekly critic Michael Slezak described the site as for any writer "who's looking for a better way to deal with cruel dismissal than crying into a cup of herbal tea" or any bookworm "who wants to better understand the indignities your future favorite authors are suffering on their way to their seven-figure book deals...."

The website became the subject of a literary controversy in late 2008 when novelist Darin Strauss used it as a forum to respond to his critics. According to The Village Voice, users of the website had launched slashing attacks on Strauss without having read any of his work, mocking his complaints, the "smirky" author photo, his theories about writing and literary history, and the "millions of dollars" that had supposedly been spent promoting him. Strauss responded on the website with an angry attack on his anonymous critics. The website has also criticized short story writer Scott Snyder and Virginia Quarterly Review editor Ted Genoways.

The website also awards a Golden Apple of Kindness award for members of the literary community who have demonstrated "niceness"; previous winners include Rosemary Ahern, the former director of Washington Square Press, and short story writer Jacob M. Appel.

== Writer, Rejected ==
Writer, Rejected, the author and maintainer of the site, operated anonymously also contributing personal stories of their own rejections in the publishing world. They promised to reveal themselves if their work was ever published and on November 7, 2014, she revealed herself as MB Caschetta, author of Miracle Girls.
