= Dixie Sheridan =

American photojournalist

Dixie Sheridan is a photojournalist, based in New York City, specializing in the documentation of the performing arts, primarily theater, off-Broadway and off-off-Broadway. The New York Public Library has acquired Sheridan's photographic archive for its New York Public Library for the Performing Arts, located at the Lincoln Center for the Performing Arts, where it will eventually be made available to the public.

Prior to establishing her photography business in New York City, Sheridan was a journalist, a public relations professional, and a theater producer.

== Biography ==
Originally from Oklahoma, she earned a bachelor's degree in drama from Vassar College and a master's degree in theater history and criticism from the University of Oklahoma.

== Career ==
After completing her education, Sheridan worked as a newspaper reporter, editor, and photographer at the Southern Dutchess News in Wappingers Falls, New York, from 1975 to 1977. While at the Southern Dutchess News, she was elected as the first woman to be president of the Mid-Hudson News Association and she won several Heritage Media Awards for excellence in reporting and feature writing.

Sheridan returned to Vassar College when she was hired as editor for the Vassar Quarterly, the alumnae/i magazine. She continued at Vassar College for 27 years, becoming assistant to the president and finally vice president for college relations. At Vassar, she and her staff in college relations received 20 awards from the international Council for Advancement and Support of Education for excellence in publications design and for strategic special events planning. At Vassar, she also was a founder, executive producer (1990–1996), and photographer (1984–2004) for the Powerhouse Summer Theater Program.

In 1997, Sheridan was given the honorary title of vice president emerita as she left Vassar to embark on a new career as free-lance photographer, and she quickly established herself in theatrical circles in New York.

== Theater work ==
Sheridan has been company photographer for Axis Theatre Company, Classic Stage Company, Collision Theory, Hotel Savant, New York International Fringe Festival, Powerhouse Summer Theater Program / New York Stage and Film. She has also worked with the Jean Cocteau Repertory, the Foundry Theatre, Joe's Pub, MCC, the New York Public Theater, the Ontological-Hysteric Theater, Rude Mechanicals, Split Britches, Theatreworks USA, and 3-Legged Dog, among others. Her theater work includes many American and world premieres, and the work of playwrights Jon Robin Baitz, Kia Corthron, Martin Crimp, Beth Henley, Warren Leight, Steve Martin, Eric Overmeyer, John Patrick Shanley, Elizabeth Swados, and Erin Cressida Wilson; and the work of directors Andrei Belgrader, Barry Edelstein, Leonard Foglia, Richard Foreman, Joe Mantello, Michael Mayer, Annie-B Parson/Paul Lazar, and Randy Sharp. Among the actors she has photographed are Mark Linn-Baker, Kathleen Chalfant, Amy Irving, Bill Irwin, Dana Ivey, Carol Kane, Kiki and Herb, Lady Bunny, Frances McDormand, Bebe Neuwirth, Estelle Parsons, Everett Quinton, Roger Rees, Reg Rogers, Deborah Rush, Tony Shalhoub, David Strathairn, Meryl Streep, Uma Thurman, and John Turturro.

== Other photography ==
Her work as a photographer also includes portraits of writers and artists for book jackets, for newspapers and magazines, and has been included in many books. She has photographed writers Mary Beth Caschetta, Alison Leslie Gold, Carole Maso, Mary McCarthy, Muriel Rukeyser, Paul Russell, Elizabeth Spires, and Monique Wittig; composers Annea Lockwood and Richard Edward Wilson; art world figures Katharine Kuh, Robert Mnuchin, Lydia Malbin; artists Louise Fishman, Nancy Graves, Catherine Murphy, and Harry Roseman.

== In print ==
Her photographs have been published in various newspapers and magazines, including the following: The American Poetry Review, Belles Lettres, BOMB, The Daily News, Dance Magazine, Der Spiegel, El Diario, Elle, L.A. Weekly, New York magazine, The New York Observer, New York Post, The New York Times, Time Out (New York and London), Variety, Village Voice, and The Washington Post.

== Reviews ==
Novelist Carole Maso has written that "Sheridan's photographs, moments generated from the real stage, isolated and freed from their context, their burden of narrative, take on a compelling, mesmerizing drama of their own. These scenarios, having lost their coordinates, are allowed to exist in a kind of staged-for-no-one space where they have a fresh, gently surrealist existence.... At once passionate and dispassionate, logical and deranged, she photographs from the depths of her psyche with wonder and aplomb.... This is the truth upon which Sheridan's seductive and fierce photographs insist."

Her work has been characterized as "Powerful and surreal" and "frighteningly full of real human emotion and mystery." According to one reviewer, Sheridan's "keen eye...has allowed her to capture fleeting moments of intensity, emotion, and action while maintaining a spare visual elegance and a surreal touch."

== One-woman exhibitions ==
May 1997. College Center Gallery, Poughkeepsie, NY

June 1997. Pulse Art Gallery, New York, NY

November 1997. Silent Pictures, Poughkeepsie, NY

June 2000. College Center Gallery, Poughkeepsie, NY

July 2000. 55 Mercer Street Gallery, New York, NY

July 2002. Beech Tree Gallery, Poughkeepsie, NY

February–March 2003. Steven Amedee Gallery, New York, NY

July 2003. Beech Tree Gallery, Poughkeepsie, NY (a changing exhibition each week for four weeks)

July 2004. Beech Tree Gallery, Poughkeepsie, NY

== Collections ==
Sheridan's prints are in various private and public collections. Her photograph, "Two Playwrights/Joe's Pub," is in the permanent collection of the Museum of Modern Art (NY), and two of her photographs are in the archive, "Here is New York," at the New York Historical Society. Two prints were recently shown at the Museum of the City of New York, in an exhibition titled PERFORM. Four prints are in the Brooklyn Council of Arts Archive for an exhibition titled, "Here Was New York." The New York Public Library has acquired Sheridan's photographic archive of Off- and Off-Off Broadway productions for its New York Public Library for the Performing Arts, at the Lincoln Center for the Performing Arts, where eventually it will be made available to the public.

== Books ==
- Main to Mudd, principal photographer. © Vassar College 1987
- Main to Mudd and More, one of two principal photographers. © Vassar College 1996
- A Sense of Occasion, concept and editor, one of 11 photographers. © Vassar College 1992
- fringe nyc '97 - '01, principal photographer. © The Present Company, 2002
