= Everette Dixie Reese =

American photographer and photojournalist

- Born: October 29, 1923; Houston, Texas
- Died: April 29, 1955 (aged 31); Saigon, Vietnam
- Spouse: Dorothy Reese née Bloomfield
- Children: Alan Reese

Everette Dixie Reese (1923–1955) was an American photographer and photojournalist. He was born in Houston, Texas. Reese served in the US Army from May 1943 through January 1946 when he was honorably discharged as Private First Class. Reese was hired as a photographer with the US Economic Cooperation Administration Office of the Special Representative in 1949. During the First Indochina War from 1951 until his death in 1955 he was stationed in Saigon, Vietnam. In 1952 he worked with the United States Information Agency in Saigon to build a photo lab for its operations, and took part in printing cultural propaganda photos.

Reese died when the plane he was flying in was shot down over Saigon.

His work is included in the collection of the Museum of Fine Arts Houston and the George Eastman Museum, which holds 5700 of his photographs and negatives.
