= Suzanne Arms =

American writer

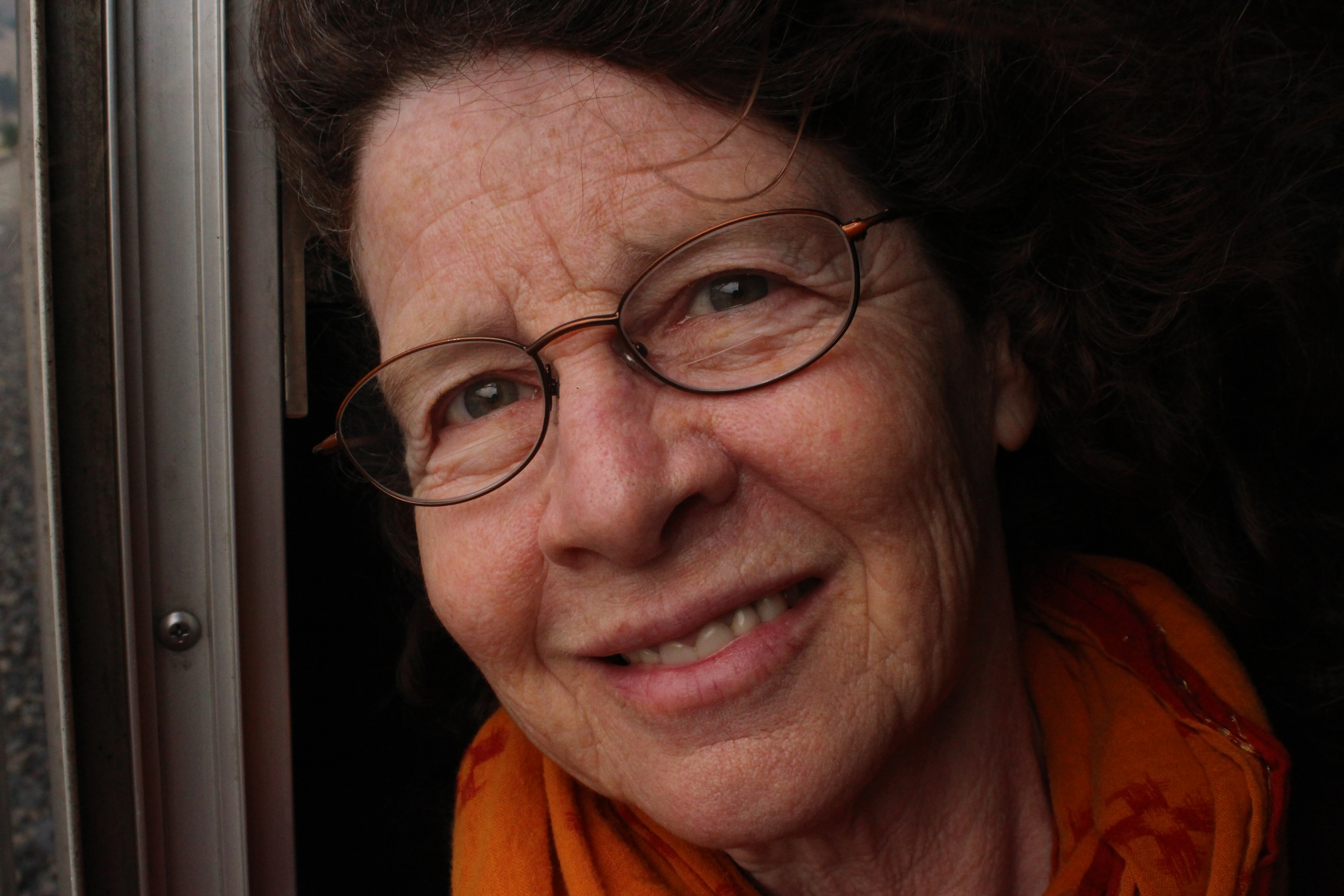
- Born: Suzanne Arms
- Citizenship: United States
- Education: University of Rochester
- Occupation: Writer
- Writing career
- Subjects: Childbirth, adoption
- Notable work: Immaculate deception (1977)
- Notable awards: Lamaze International Lifetime Achievement Award

Suzanne Arms is an American writer. She has published seven books on childbirth and child care.

== Life ==
Arms was born in Summit, New Jersey, and grew up on the East Coast of the United States. Her parents were both teachers. She received a BA in literature from the University of Rochester in Rochester, New York. She moved to Marin County, California to work as a teacher in nursery schools and in the Head Start Program.

== Work ==
Her first book, A Season to be Born, was published in 1973. It was a diary of the birth of her daughter, with photographs by the baby's father, John Arms.

A second book, Immaculate Deception: A New Look at Women and Childbirth in America, appeared in 1975, which became a best-seller, was a New York Times Best Book of the Year; By 1979, it had sold more than 150,000 copies.

Arms has described the precautions against risk in obstetric wards in the West as "just-in-case obstetrics".

In 1978, with six other women, Arms started a birth center, The Birth Place, in Palo Alto, California; it was organized much as she had proposed in her 1975 book. It became a state-licensed facility in the year 1979.

Arms has made documentary films on pregnancy and birth: she shot, directed, and produced Five Women, Five Births in the 1970s; Giving Birth (35') was made in 1998. She also directed and co-produced the film "Birth" with Christopher Carson, which is critical of the medical-pharmaceutical-hospital approach to birth, proposing a different approach.

== Recognition ==
Arms has been awarded the Lamaze International Lifetime Achievement Award for her contribution to the field of childbirth.

== Books ==
- Suzanne Arms, John Arms. A Season to Be Born. New York: Harper & Row [1973]
- Suzanne Arms. Immaculate Deception: A New Look at Women and Childbirth in America. Boston: Houghton Mifflin, 1975 (reprinted 1977, 1985)
- To Love and Let Go (1983)
- Adoption: A Handful of Hope (1985)
- Seasons of Change: Growing Through Pregnancy & Birth (1993)
- Immaculate Deception II: Myth, Magic and Birth (1994 & 1997)
- Breastfeeding: How to Breastfeed Your Baby (2004)
