= Matthew Naythons =

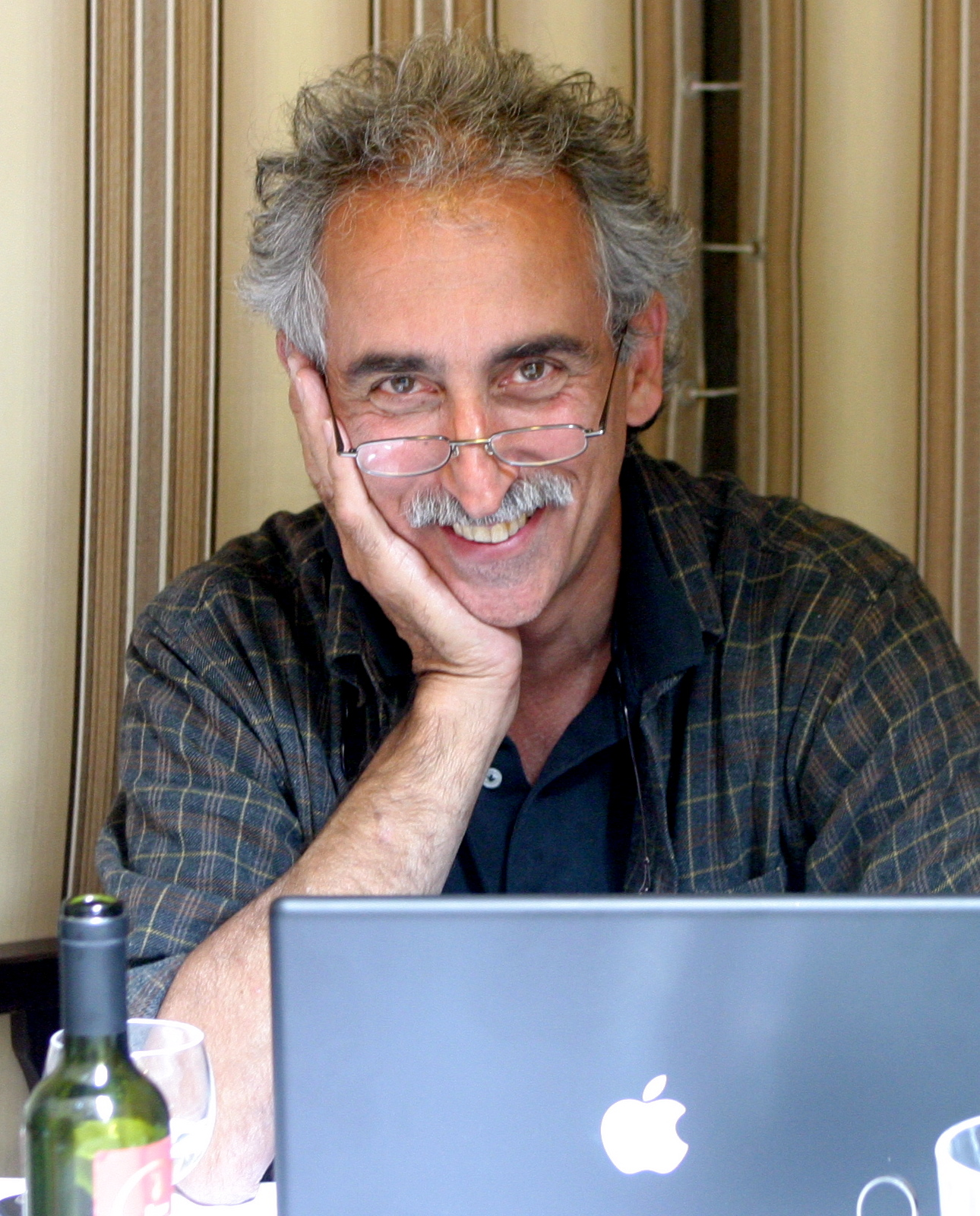
- Born: February 8, 1946 (age 80)
- Occupation: Photographer

Matthew Naythons (February 8, 1946) is an American photojournalist, physician and publisher. Naythons trained as a medical doctor, and began working as a photojournalist in the 1970s. During his photographic career, he founded an NGO, and later became a writer and publisher.

== Biography ==
=== Photojournalism ===
Naythons' arrived in Prague in August 1968, two weeks ahead of the Soviet army, which he photographed during the Warsaw Pact invasion of Czechoslovakia. After graduating from medical school in 1972 he went to California where he completed a rotating internship at Highland Hospital in Oakland. At the end of his internship, he took six months off and moved to Amsterdam. In October 1973, with help from a Dutch publisher and a friendly press-card carrying photographer, he was able to get on an El Al flight from Amsterdam for journalists covering the Yom Kippur War.

In 1975, Naythons arrived in Saigon three weeks before it fell, photographing for Time and evacuating during the Fall of Saigon in a United States Marine Corps helicopter. Naythons was one of the first on the scene of the massacre in Jonestown, 1978; he had originally been scheduled to travel with Congressman Leo Ryan, who was murdered there by members of the Peoples Temple. While covering the Nicaraguan Revolution, he was struck but unharmed by a government soldier's rifle in Managua, Nicaragua, in 1979.

=== NGO work ===
Naythons' profession as a photographer led him to become active in the places he visited. In response to the Cambodian refugee crisis he witnessed first-hand in 1979, Naythons founded and led International Medical Teams (IMT), a mobile team of physicians, nurses and paramedics that brought health care across the Thai border into Cambodia from 1979 to 1981.

== Publishing career ==
In 1989 Naythons worked with Phillip Moffitt and Rick Smolan to publish The Power to Heal

In 1991, Naythons founded Epicenter Communications, of which he is president and CEO. The company creates photojournalism, multimedia, and Internet projects. Projects included The Face of Mercy: A Photographic History of Medicine at War, with an introduction by William Styron, Clinton: A Portrait of Victory—the first best-selling book to have an accompanying CD-ROM, Christmas Around the World, the first coffee table book with an accompanying website and reader community, and the official presidential inaugural books for Bill Clinton, George Bush and Barack Obama.

In 1995 Epicenter formed two Internet health divisions: NetMed and NetHealth. Epicenter created some of the first disease-specific health sites on the Internet, including websites such as Alzheimers.com, Diabetes.com, Depression.com, and Obesity.com.

== Matthew Naythons Photographic Archive ==
The Matthew Naythons Photographic Archive resides in the Dolph Briscoe Center for American History at the University of Texas at Austin. This archive consists of materials from both Naythons’ photojournalism (1972–86) and his work as a publisher/producer (1986–present), and includes negatives (1,000), transparencies (6,800, in both black and white, and color), photographic prints (3,200), contact sheets and other paraphernalia.

Naythons’ photographic work documents the Fall of Saigon, the Yom Kippur War, the Nicaraguan revolution, and the Jonestown suicide/massacre, among other turbulent political events of the late 1970s. In addition to substantive coverage of seven wars and revolutions, the collection includes his features on the Centers for Disease Control, Burmese rubies, and the film Apocalypse Now, and portraits of Steve Jobs, Charles M. Schulz, Pope John Paul II, President Jimmy Carter, Kevin Costner and Hunter S. Thompson.
