= Bill Hatcher =

American photographer (born 1959)

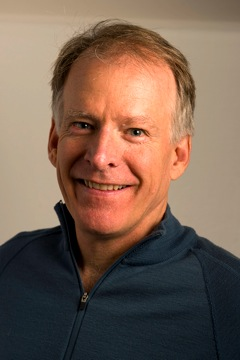
Bill Hatcher, Photographer

Bill Hatcher (born 1959) is an American photographer. His first story published in National Geographic (magazine) was “Storming the Tower” May 1996, a cover story that documents the free ascent of the East face of the Nameless Tower in the Trango Towers, Pakistan. He has covered other stories for National Geographic (magazine) including the first mountain biking and canyoning coverage to appear in the magazine. He has won several awards and recognition for his photography including for photography in Communication Arts (magazine) Advertising Annual 1996, Communication Photography Annual 2004 annual, Sports Emmy Award for electronic cameraperson for the film “Vietnam: Into the Dragon’s Teeth" and inclusion in the National Geographic (magazine) special edition of “100 Best Pictures” 2001.

== External link ==
- Website
