= Michael Schennum =

Mike Schennum is a photojournalist with The Arizona Republic. His face appeared on a 2012 Time magazine cover montage for a story about Latino voters, despite the fact that Schennum has one parent who is of Chinese descent, and one parent who is of Irish and Norwegian descent.

== Education ==
Schennum earned a B.A. in art from University of California, Santa Cruz in 2000. He also took photojournalism courses at San Francisco State University. His first Intro to Photography class sparked his interest in photojournalism.

== Career ==
Schennum has been working in professional photojournalism for eight years. He works as a staff photographer for The Arizona Republic. Prior to working here, he was an intern at the Appleton Post-Crescent and the Palo Alto Daily News. He also taught courses in photojournalism at Arizona State University. He has done freelance work for a number of magazines and newspapers across the US.

== Organizations ==
Schennum is a member of the Asian American Journalists Association. He was also on the board of the local Arizona chapter for seven years.

== Awards and honors ==
In 2005 he won the Sports Illustrated Assignment award.
