= John Ranard =

American photographer

John Ranard (photographer)
- Born: John Kent Ranard; February 7, 1952; Washington, D.C.
- Died: May 14, 2008 (aged 56); New York City
- Education: Center for Photographic Studies, Louisville, Kentucky; Hunter College, New York City
- Known for: Social documentary photography
- Awards: Pictures of the Year International; 1998 First Place for Issue Reporting Picture Story

John Ranard (February 7, 1952 – May 14, 2008) was a social documentary photographer who won critical acclaim for his gritty, multi-layered photographs of Louisville, Kentucky's social classes, the world of boxing, Russia during the period of perestroika, AIDS in Russia and Russian prison life.

== Early life ==
Ranard was the son of a foreign service diplomat, Donald L. Ranard, who, during and after government service, became active in human rights. John Ranard spent much of his childhood in Asian countries, among them Japan, Malaya, Korea, and Burma, and also Australia. After returning to the United States following these sojourns, Ranard attended the University of New Mexico, but his college life was interrupted when it was discovered he had Hodgkin's disease. Ranard overcame this, but it was during his treatment with blood transfusions that his doctors later believed he had contracted Hepatitis C, which dogged him for the rest of his life and finally killed him.

While recovering from Hodgkin's, Ranard returned to his family home in Vienna, Virginia, and there, in the mid-1970s, he suffered a broken neck in a car accident and used the insurance settlement money to study at Louisville's Center for Photographic Studies. In the late 1970s, he was able to publish his work in two alternative Louisville news magazines, City Paper and Louisville Today, experimenting freely. He achieved a reputation during this time "as one of Louisville's most active and original photographers", publishing his work journalistically but also exhibiting in art venues such as Louisville's Portland Museum.

== Boxing portfolio ==
It was during his Louisville period that Ranard began to photograph the inside world of amateur and professional boxing. His entry into professional boxing was empowered through a close association with the Louisville boxer Greg Page, who was managed by Don King in the early part of his career, and who was a heavyweight champion for five months in 1984–1985.

In his boxing portfolio, entitled The Brutal Aesthetic, Ranard developed his work into a tightly-controlled, disciplined style of black-and-white photography. While Ranard photographed battles in the ring, the greater part of this portfolio is given over to capturing the background events of the sport which suggested its explosiveness. Marcy Werner, a curator at the University of Louisville Fine Print Collection, has written an MA dissertation on Ranard's work, and suggests that it was during this time that Ranard transformed from a documentary photographer into a social documentary photographer. She noticed, for instance, Ranard's critical depiction of the entourage of promoters and managers which surround fighters and make (or hope to make) a wealthy living from the fighters' sacrifices in the ring. She also noticed an occasional gentleness in the portfolio, citing the photograph "Purcell Davis (1979)", of a fighter disrobing at weigh-in, a jersey covering his head so that only the contour of his body showed, which recalled to her the contrapposto technique in Michelangelo's David. In "Round 1—Jerry McIntyre (vs. Greg Page) (1979)", a photograph of an unconscious fighter surrounded by handlers, she was reminded of Raphael's The Deposition.

In 1985, Ranard read an essay by Joyce Carol Oates on boxing which appeared in the New York Times Magazine and approached Oates with the idea of a book collaboration. In his letter to her, Ranard expressed his aesthetics on documentary photography:

The photograph is a mystery, said by Winogrand best. "There is nothing more mysterious as a fact clearly described." The emotional impact of a well taken picture is immediate yet the inherent ideas are at best alluded to, specific in detail but always open to interpretation. The documentary photograph deals more in myth than reality. The image that is important when looking at a photograph is the second image, conjured up in the viewers [sic] mind-memory. Only the documentary photograph has this power because the photographic illustration is not believed. In a documentary photograph we know it happened because the photograph proves it and we feel the pain. This explains why Hollywood can't approach the horror of Viet Nam that the news photographs taken in the streets and jungle suggest. Deer Hunter comes close, but that movie always reminds me of the photograph of the South Vietnamese colonel executing the Viet Cong suspect.

Oates subsequently expanded on her essay and portions of The Brutal Aesthetic appeared aside her text in the book On Boxing, published in 1987 and now (2017) a Harper Perennial. In 1986, the year before the publication of On Boxing, Ranard's Brutal Aesthetic portfolio won a Kentucky Arts Council Al Smith Fellowship.

Photographs from On Boxing appeared at an exhibition by the International Center for Photography in New York City of the "most notable photography books" of 1987, entitled "Midtown Review". Oates said of Ranard's photographs, "They're very poetic. They're the highest kind of journalism, where it passes into art. They're very unpretentious."

== Russian work ==
In the mid-1980s, Ranard moved to New York City's East Village and periodically photographed the street life of his neighborhood, squatter rights turmoil, and the Tompkins Square Park protests. In 1992, Ranard began to take numerous long trips to photograph the disintegration of the Soviet Union. A portion of his Russian portfolio focused on drug users and the HIV/AIDS problem in Russia. In 1998, in the 55th Annual Pictures of the Year Competition, he won first place for an Issue Reporting Picture Story from the National Press Association and the Missouri School of Journalism for his photo essay on drug use in Russia, "Inside a High Risk Community". The photos had appeared earlier in The New York Times Week in Review, accompanying an article by Michael Specter.

Later, Ranard received financial contracts from the Soros Open Society Institute to continue his work on AIDS in Russia. He also received support from Médecins Sans Frontières (Holland) and AIDS Foundation East-West (AFEW). The latter used his photographs in media campaigns in Russia and Eastern Europe to warn of the dangers of drugs and also to help the institution raise funds. Médecins Sans Frontières and AFEW together published two of Ranard's books on Russia, The Fire Within (2001) and Full Life (2001).The Fire Within is about drug abuse and Full Life is a general documentary on life in Russia. The books add up to about 100 pages and contain some 54 photographs.

During Ranard's explorations in Russia, he gained an inside look at Russian prisons, for both males and females, and juveniles. Ranard's prison photos overlap with his work on HIV/AIDS in Russia, but it also comprises a separate portfolio entitled The Prisoners which he drafted into a mock-up book.

== Commentary on HIV/AIDS photographs ==
One unusual aspect of Ranard's Russian work on HIV/AIDS is the depth of appreciation it evoked in scholars who were involved in the AIDS field. Ranard's work did not exploit the fiendish aspects of drug users, as has been common among the voyeuristic photography of this genre. HIV/AIDS scholars have remarked of the "stoicism" with which Ranard photographed drug users in Russia, with elements of compassion, maintaining their dignity and representing them as human. Yet Ranard did not view the AIDS problem through rosy lenses; rather, the dry horror of the problem is more commonly intimated through capturing the isolation and alienation of drug users, and those who might be in prison because of it.

== Return to Louisville ==
In the early years after 2000, Ranard began to find that his battle with Hepatitis C was taking its toll. Receiving treatment, he could not travel abroad as he had before, and he decided to return to Louisville to photograph the store-front churches of the black community and the struggles of the churches with the problem of black violence among teenagers. This portfolio was also put into mock-up form for publication and is titled On Every Corner.

== Death ==
As Ranard's health declined, he contracted liver cancer and began to photograph himself in the terminal tangent of his last months. Some of these photographs are shockingly candid, while others are more oblique but resonate with foreboding. One of the more powerful, "Self-Portrait with Female Nursing Assistant" (2007), was exhibited at a memorial, mini-retrospective show at the Hite Art Institute's Cressman Center for Visual Arts in Louisville in 2009 and appears in the hard-copy edition of Kathleen Keish's review of the exhibition in Louisville Eccentric Observer. Many of Ranard's photographs of himself in terminal illness, or which imply illness, were taken with small cameras held by hand at a distance or while he was receiving treatment at hospitals, in the manner of "selfies" with an iPhone camera, or with the help of image reflection in mirrors. In other cases, photographs such as "Self-Portrait with Female Nursing Assistant" were set up with tripods and timers. These photographs constitute his last portfolio. In late 2007, he received a liver transplant but it was unsuccessful and on May 14, 2008, he died.

At the time of his death, Ranard was in possession of four mock-up books of his life's work which he was attempting to publish in a media form that might be widely disseminated: The Brutal Aesthetic (which had never been published in entirety), Lost Heroes (about life in Russia during the fall of the Empire), The Prisoners (about Russian prisons), and On Every Corner (about race relations between blacks and whites in Louisville and the city's African-American store-front churches). Several of these books contain short essays by Ranard and biographical information about his history.

== Legacy ==
Ranard generally shot in black-and-white with a wry eye to exposing the falsities and injustices he encountered. The Cressman Center said of its memorial show of Ranard's work in 2009, it is "most impressive in its breadth, consistency, and emotive impact" and that his photographs 'transcend journalism and become an exquisite representation and expression of shared humanity." AFEW's obituary read:

John was in many ways the backbone of the start-up of harm reduction in Russia. His social photographic work is pure art; but it also showed us the harsh reality and illustrated in a brilliant and compassionate way the urgent need to respond. In my mind, he is a worthy candidate for the Rolleston Award, even if he were to receive it posthumously."

== Awards ==
- 1984: Kentucky Humanities Council, The Photograph as Document.
- 1985: Al Smith Fellowship from Kentucky Arts Council for The Brutal Aesthetic.
- 1998: First Place, Issue Reporting Story, 55th Annual Pictures of the Year, Pictures of the Year International. Sponsored by National Press Photographers Association and Missouri School of Journalism.
- 2005: Lower Manhattan Cultural Council. New York City Library, Tompkins Square Branch, New York. 14 Below.

== Collections ==
Ranard's work is held in the following permanent collections or collections of institutions:

- The University of Louisville, Fine Print Collection
- The Brooklyn Museum
- The Andrei Sakharov Museum, Moscow (Note: The organisation itself is not cited because although the Andrei Sakharov Museum is a prestigious institution, it is devoted to issues of "peace, progress and human rights" and does not advertise art works in its possession.)
- Soros Open Society Foundation (Note: The organisation is not cited. The Open Society Foundation, formerly Open Society Institute, is not in the business of collecting art work although their acquisition of items of art is notable. They do not advertise such acquisitions.)
- Museum of World Culture, Gothenburg, Sweden

== Publications ==
=== Publications by Ranard ===
- Oates, Joyce Carol and John Ranard. On Boxing.
  - New York: Doubleday, 1987. ISBN 9780385239424.
  - New York: Ecco, 1994.
  - New York: HarperCollins, 2006. ISBN 978-0060874506.
- Ranard, John. Forty Pounds of Salt: a Travelogue Through the Environs of Moscow. New York: Fly by Night, 1995. OCLC 35615115. English text with Russian subtitles.
- Ranard, John and Dave Burrows. The Fire Within. Moscow: Médecins Sans Frontières (Holland) & AIDS Foundation East-West, 2001. ISBN 9785933210252. Russian and English text.
- Ranard, John. A Full Life. Moscow: Médecins Sans Frontières (Holland) & AIDS Foundation East-West, 2001.
- John Ranard: Social Documentary Photography, Russia and Newly Independent States. Louisville: University of Louisville, 2001. OCLC 740264437. Text and photographs by Ranard.
- Ranard, John, Anne-Lore Kuryszczuk and Aleksandr Glyadyelov. Positive Lives. Ukraine: Médecins Sans Frontières, AIDS Foundation East-West, and Center for Contemporary Art, 2001. ISBN 966-95825-2-0.

=== Publications with contributions by Ranard ===
- The Best in Photojournalism 1997: The Year in Pictures. (Anthology). Durham, NC: National Press Photographers Association, 1998.
- Pandemic: Facing AIDS. New York: Umbrage Editions and Moxie Firecracker Films, 2003. With essays by Kofi Annan, Nadine Gordimer, Rory Kennedy, Nan Richardson and Jeffrey Sachs. Hardcover ISBN 1-884167-17-9. An anthology.

== Video contributions ==
- Sex, Needles and Roubles (2005). Produced by Chloe Mercier and Laika Pictures. Directed by Chloe Mercier. Distributed by Journeyman Pictures. Still photography by Ranard.
- HIV Shoots Up (2010). Directed by Martin Feeth. Produced by British Medical Journal Publishing. With 7 photographs by Ranard.
- The AFEW Story (2011). Produced by AIDS Foundation East-West. With 7 photographs by Ranard.

== Exhibitions ==
=== 1988–2005 ===
- University of Louisville Photo Archives, KY. On Boxing. 1988 (solo)
- A Gathering of the Tribes Gallery, New York. Forty Pounds of Salt. 1995 (solo) (Note: Steve Cannon, the founder of A Gathering of the Tribes organization, has confirmed through email correspondence (26 September 2017) that the Forty Pounds of Salt exhibition in 1995 occurred and that he helped to curate the show.)
- Alfred Loewenhutz Gallery, The Camera Club of New York, New York. Moscow/Chechnya. 1996 (solo)
- Leica Gallery, New York. Russia in Transition. 1999–2001 (group, traveling)
- OK Harris Gallery, New York. John Ranard. 2000 (solo)
- Oude Kerk (old church), Amsterdam, Netherlands. Photography and HIV/AIDS. 30 November – 9 December 2001. Ranard and Bertien van Manen
- Allan R. Hite Art Institute, Louisville, KY. Social Documentary Photography from Russia. 12 January – 9 February 2001 (solo)
- Moscow Center for Prison Reform, Moscow. Man and Prison. 2000–2005 (traveling)
- Andrei Sakharov Museum, Moscow. The Fire Within. 6–30 June 2001 (solo)
- Center for Contemporary Arts, Kyiv, Ukraine, 2001; International AIDS Conference, Barcelona, Spain, 2002; Museum of Arts Lviv, Ukraine, 2002; Museum of Arts Odesa, Ukraine, 2002.Positive Lives. Ranard, Kuryszczuk, and Glyadyelov (traveling)
- Philadelphia Art Alliance. Pandemic, Facing AIDS. 2003–2004 (traveling)
- Museum of World Culture, Gothenburg, Sweden. HIV/AIDS in the Age of Globalization. 2005.
- The Fire Within, shown as Moving Walls 10 in the Moving Walls series of exhibitions, Open Society Institute, New York, 2005.
- A Gathering of the Tribes Gallery, New York. John Ranard and Chin Chih Yang. 2005. (Collaboration) (Note: Steve Cannon, the founder of A Gathering of the Tribes organization, and Chin Chih Yang, with whom Ranard collaborated, have confirmed through correspondence (26 September 2017 and 27 September 2017) that the John Ranard and Chin Chih Yang exhibition in 2005 occurred at A Gathering of the Tribes.)
- New York Public Library, Tompkins Square Branch. 14 Below. 13 July – 24 August 2005. (group, curated by Ranard)

=== Posthumous ===
- John Ranard Memorial Exhibition, A Gathering of the Tribes Gallery, New York City, September 2008; Hite Art Institute's Cressman Center for Visual Arts, Louisville, KY, 2009; Open Society Institute Offices, New York, March 2010 – 2011.
- The Brutal Aesthetic (exhibition), Muhammad Ali Center, Louisville, KY, September 23 – November 30, 2011.
- Famous Faces: Picturing Celebrity in the Photographic Archives (exhibition), Archives and Special Collections, Ekstrom Library, University of Louisville, KY, June 13 – September 27, 2013. (group)
- Kentucky Captured:Photographs Inspired by the Bluegrass State (exhibition), Speed Art Museum, Louisville, KY, 12 March – 17 July 2016. (Note: .Three of Ranard's photographs appeared in the exhibition according to correspondence (8 March 2016) with University of Louisville curator Elizabeth Reilly, although Ranard's name is not mentioned on the website advertising the exhibition.)
