= Steve Simon (photographer) =

American photographer and author

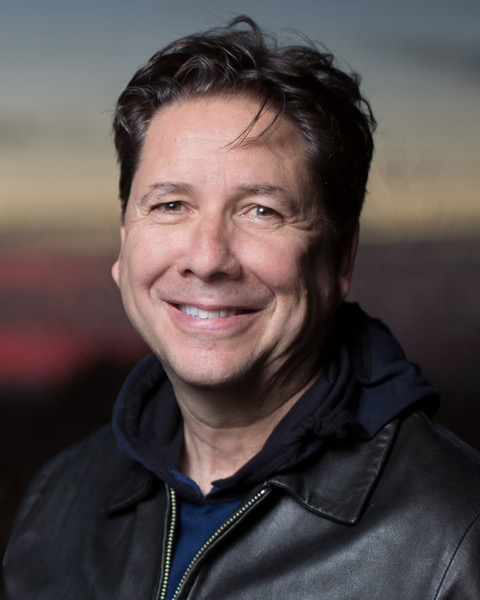
- Born: 1960 (age 65–66); Montreal
- Education: Dawson Institute of Photography, Concordia University
- Occupations: Documentary photographer & author.
- Website: www.stevesimonphoto.com/index

Steve Simon (born 1960) is an American-Canadian documentary photographer and author. He has authored five critically-acclaimed photography books. His book, The Passionate Photographer (translated in German, Spanish, Chinese and Malay was chosen as one of Amazon's Top Ten Art and Photography Books of 2011 (in its second edition as of 2019).

== Early life and education ==
Simon's first experience with a camera was at age 11 in his home city of Montreal. Three years later he began shooting professionally, working at the weekly newspaper The North Shore News (1962–1980) on Montreal's West Island, documenting life where he lived. By age 17, he was writing a weekly How To Photography Column self-syndicated to several newspapers in Canada including The Montreal Gazette, Toronto Star and Ottawa Citizen (1979–1986). In 1981, Bernard Gladstone of The New York Times published the first of his three articles on photography featured in The Times.

Simon received his Certificate of Professional Photography in 1981 after attending the Dawson Institute of Photography in Montreal. He went on to complete a Bachelor of Arts in Photography from Concordia University, Montreal in 1985. He has studied with photographers Eugene Richards, Mary Ellen Mark and Sam Abell on workshops in Maine and Santa Fe.

== Career ==
Simon worked as a photographer at The Edmonton Journal, Edmonton, Alberta, Canada, from 1986 to 1996.

He captured The Canadian Press Photo of the Year in 1987 of the Edmonton Tornado. From 1996 to 2000, Simon served as the Photojournalism Professor and head of the Loyalist College Photojournalism Program in Belleville, Ontario.

Simon began his project America at the Edge documenting the United States bordering Canada in 1996.

He left his teaching job in 2000 and emigrated to New York City. He has photographed on assignment in more than 40 countries and his work has been published in The New York Times Magazine, Maclean's, The Walrus, and other media.

In 2004, Simon started his American Political Convention project with his coverage of the Republican National Convention in New York City. His book, The Republicans was released soon after, focusing on the attendees, media and protests that highlight political identity in American life.

In June 2008, Simon became one of four contributing photographers for The Digital Journalist, along with Peter Turnley, David Turnley and James Whitlow Delano.

In 2024, Simon continued his long-term project documenting American political conventions, capturing both the Republican National Convention in Milwaukee; and the Democratic National Convention in Chicago.

Simon has delivered lectures and presentations at numerous prominent institutions, conferences, and events globally.

=== Educator ===
From 1996 to 2000, Steve Simon was the Photojournalism Professor and head of the Loyalist College Photojournalism Program in Belleville, Ontario. During his tenure, he designed and taught various courses, including Documentary Photography, Electronic Imaging, Ethics, Staff Photography, and Freelance Photography.

Following his work at Loyalist College, Simon joined the faculty at the International Center of Photography (ICP) in New York from 2007 to 2010. There, he taught core courses in the Documentary Practice and Visual journalism Program.

In 2009–2010, Simon created and taught the Editorial Photography course for the Masters of Professional Studies program at the School of Visual Arts (SVA) in New York City, as part of their Digital Masters Program. He continued his involvement at SVA as a Thesis Advisor in 2016.

Currently, Simon leads photography workshops around the world through his company, PhotoEducate.com. He is a faculty member at Maine Media in Rockport, Maine, where he conducts both online and in-person workshops, providing mentorship to photographers of all levels.

== Exhibitions ==
- 2008: America at the Edge, Leica Gallery, New York City
- 2008: America at the Edge, Sol Mednick Gallery, Philadelphia
- 2006: Heroines & Heroes, Gallery One, Toronto, Canada
- 2006: America at the Edge, Muestra Fotografica, Zapala, Argentina
- 2005: The Republicans, Gallery One, Toronto, Canada.
- 2005: America at the Edge, Museo Fine Arts – Rafaela, Santa Fé, Argentina

== Books ==
- Simon, Steve (2011). The Passionate Photographer: Ten Steps Toward Becoming Great. New Riders. ISBN 9780321719898.

- Simon, Steve (2006). Heroines & Heroes: Hope, HIV and Africa. Charta. ISBN 88-8158-610-X.

- Simon, Steve (2006). The Republicans. Charta, Italy. ISBN 88-8158-561-8.

- Simon, Steve (2002). Empty Sky: The Pilgrimage to Ground Zero. Stanke. ISBN 2-7604-0914-7.

- Simon, Steve (1995). Healing Waters: The Pilgrimage To Lac Ste. Anne. University of Alberta Press. ISBN 0-88864-277-6.

== Awards and honors ==
Simon has won multiple awards. Notable among them include:

- 1993 – Canadian News Photographer of the Year by The Canadian Press
- 1994 – Award of Merit in Editorial Photography
- 1999 – National Press Photographers Association Pictures of the Year : Award of Excellence.
