= William Campbell (filmmaker) =

American photojournalist, filmmaker and film producer

William "Bill" Campbell is a former Time Magazine photojournalist and a current documentary filmmaker and the president of Homefire Productions, Inc. He is married to Maryanne Vollers.

== Background ==
Campbell established his career as photojournalist with Time Magazine in Africa and the Middle East, and has been a member of the National Press Photographers Association since 1978. After moving to Montana in 1997, he switched his focus to film and video, and has since produced current affairs programming for Nightline, NBC News and PBS Now, where he is a contributing producer. Two of Campbell’s hour-long documentaries, Season of the Grizzly, about grizzly bears surviving in Yellowstone National Park, and Sole Survivors: The Yellowstone Bison, about the fate of the Yellowstone bison herd, have been shown on Animal Planet and the Discovery Channel. In 2007, Campbell co-produced, directed and filmed Wolves in Paradise, a documentary about wolves and ranchers in the "New West", in conjunction with Montana PBS and ITVS.

== Filmography ==
- Season of the Grizzly (2003)
- Sole Survivors: The Yellowstone Bison (2004)
- Wolves in Paradise (2007)
- America's Wild Spaces (2008)

== Recognition ==
Campbell's documentary film Wolves in Paradise, received a 2008 CINE Golden Eagle Award for 'Best Documentary - Environmental and Natural Science', and a 2008 'Best of Fest Award" at the Hazel Wolf Environmental Film Festival, as well as a 2008 Regional Emmy Award nomination .
