= Justine Schiavo-Hunt =

Justine Schiavo-Hunt (born September 9, 1966) is an American photojournalist and newspaper photographer.

She is known mostly for her work as a staff photographer for The Boston Globe and Boston.com. Her work includes New England and Boston's breaking news, EMS, pictorials, crime, courts and sports. Her work and contribution to photojournalism is notable as photojournalists and Boston Globe staff photographers were predominantly male in the early 1990s.

In 1989, Schiavo graduated from Northeastern University with a B.A in journalism. After college, she was briefly employed at the Boston Herald. In 1990, Schiavo began working as a staff photographer at The Boston Globe, where she worked until 2008.

She has also used the names Justine Schiavo and Justine Ellement.
