= Steve Raymer =

American journalist

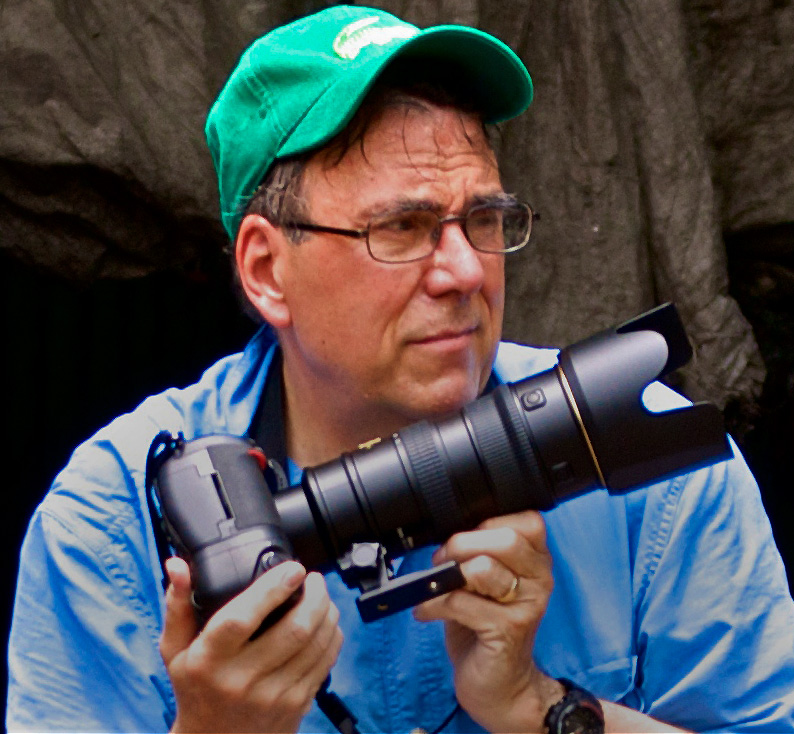
- Steven Laurence Raymer
- Born: Beloit, Wisconsin
- Occupations: Photojournalist, Writer, Educator

Steve Raymer is an American photojournalist, author, and educator. A National Geographic staff photographer for over two decades, Raymer reported extensively on the Soviet Union and covered numerous conflicts and humanitarian crises in South and Southeast Asia. He served as director of the National Geographic Society News Service in Washington, D.C. from 1989 to 1995. Raymer is currently a Professor of Journalism at Indiana University.

== Early life, education and military service ==
Raymer was born in Beloit, Wisconsin, where his father, Laurence "Larry" Raymer, was executive editor of the Beloit Daily News. Raymer attended the University of Wisconsin–Madison, earning a Bachelor of Science in Journalism in June 1967. He was thereafter commissioned a second lieutenant in the United States Army and served as an artillery and public affairs officer during the Vietnam War. After leaving the service in 1970, he returned to Madison to continue his studies, earning a Master of Arts in Journalism and Mass Communication in 1971. (He would go on to receive a John S. Knight Fellowship for the academic year of 1984–85 at Stanford University and a DART Fellowship in Reporting Trauma and Conflict at the Columbia University Graduate School of Journalism.)

== National Geographic career ==
Raymer began working as a picture editor for National Geographic in 1972, and in eighteen months' time was promoted to staff photographer. His first reporting dealt with the Menominee Indians of Wisconsin and the Amana Colonies of Iowa. His first major international assignments were articles on the global hunger crisis and the Bangladesh famine of 1974.

Later stories reported on the construction of the Trans-Alaska Pipeline System, and Raymer was picture editor of National Geographic's book "Alaska: High Roads to Adventure", published in 1976, in addition to contributing a sizable number of its photographs. From 1977 to 1985, he photographed stories on numerous issues in South Asia, including the international narcotics trade, the worldwide illegal trade in endangered animals, and covered the Soviet occupation of Kabul, Afghanistan.

The May 1987 issue of National Geographic featured Raymer's photographs of the Chernobyl disaster, as well as a separate, more general photographic study of Ukrainian culture under the Soviet Union. Other notable reportage included stories about the Gulf of Alaska, the revival of Hawaiian culture, the Kingdom of Thailand, and the Falkland Islands five years after the Falkland War in the South Atlantic between Great Britain and Argentina.

Raymer's photograph of a French Foreign Legion sniper in Djibouti became the subject of notoriety after it turned up as part of an elaborate fraud perpetrated by William E. Clark, who falsely claimed to be depicted in the image. The controversy was described in a Tom Junod article entitled "Mercenary", published in Esquire Magazine in June 2007.

The National Press Photographers Association and the University of Missouri honored Raymer as "Magazine Photographer of the Year" — one of photojournalism's most coveted awards — for his reporting of the global hunger crisis in 1976. Raymer also received a citation for excellence in foreign reporting from the Overseas Press Club of America and won numerous first-place awards from the White House News Photographers' Association.

=== National Geographic Society News Service ===
From 1989 to 1995, Raymer was director of the National Geographic Society News Service, supervising National Geographic staff working in collaboration with several other news services, including the Associated Press, while continuing to cover events in the Persian Gulf and former Soviet Union for National Geographic, including articles on Siberia, the birth of a democratic Russia, and the city of St. Petersburg. During this time, he authored and photographed a book on St. Petersburg, published by Turner Publishing Company in 1994.

== Indiana University ==
Raymer joined the faculty of Indiana University in 1995 and was promoted through the academic ranks from assistant, to associate, and finally to full professor based on the strength of his continued authorship of critically acclaimed non-fiction books of words and images on subjects ranging from Vietnam and Islam in Southeast Asia to the global Indian Diaspora and a profile of Calcutta. Raymer teaches classes in numerous sub-disciplines within the field of journalism such as media ethics and values, international newsgathering, reporting war and terrorism, and various classes in visual journalism. He also is an adjunct professor of the Dhar India Studies Program at Indiana University and associated with the Russia and East European Studies Institute, and remains a Professor of Journalism as of 2013, teaching classes in numerous sub-disciplines within the field of journalism such as media ethics and war/crisis reporting. During this time he authored several books. His book Redeeming Calcutta: A Portrait of India's Imperial Capital, did not receive favourable reviews in India for its depiction of visual clichés and inaccurate captions. According to Kolkata-based journalist Shamik Bag, "while the introduction lays the pitch for an effort at redemption, the photographs often betray the plan. For all his nuanced understanding of perceived notions, Raymer devotes around nine frames to the hand-drawn rickshaws or portraits of its pullers as an emphatic continuation of a Calcutta visual cliché. Some of the captions seem stretched, erroneous and irrelevant. A photograph of an elderly lady sitting on a rickshaw is explained as the lady being vulnerable to the toxic brew of vehicle exhausts, with the additional information that Calcutta is the air pollution capital of India, even though a 2011 World Health Organization survey found Ludhiana, Kanpur, Delhi, Lucknow and Indore to be more polluted. Yet another caption mentions that the most frequent users of the rickshaw are "just a notch above the truly poor"—a lazy assertion ripped from a 2008 National Geographic article by Calvin Trillin".

== Other projects ==
Raymer's photographs have been exhibited widely in museums and galleries in the United States and Great Britain, including at Christie's in New York. Under the auspices of the State Department, the Asia Society and the Overseas Press Club, Raymer has lectured on photojournalism, war correspondence, and media ethics in the United States, Great Britain, Russia, Poland, China, India, Malaysia, Singapore, the Philippines, Hong Kong and Vietnam. He has also appeared on the Today Show, the BBC, Voice of America, and many other global news outlets. Raymer is a longtime contributor to Bloomington lifestyle publication Bloom Magazine.

== Published works ==
- Redeeming Calcutta, Oxford University Press, 2012 worldcat.org. A study in photographs and text of India's former imperial capital.
- Images of a Journey: India in Diaspora, Indiana University Press, 2007 worldcat.org. Deals with the culture of Indian immigrants throughout the world.
- Living Faith: Inside the Muslim World of Southeast Asia, Asia Images Group Pte. Ltd, 2001 worldcat.org.
- The Vietnam Cookbook, Capital Publishers, 2002.
- Land of the Ascending Dragon: Rediscovering Vietnam, Hastings House Publishers, 1997.
- St. Petersburg, Turner Publishing/CNN, 1994 worldcat.org. A study in photographs and text of St. Petersburg after the fall of the Soviet Union.
