= Bill Groethe =

American photographer (1923–2020)

William McAndrew Groethe
- Born: November 2, 1923; Rapid City, South Dakota, U.S.
- Died: December 20, 2020 (aged 97); Rapid City, South Dakota, U.S.
- Occupations: photographer and photo printer and finisher
- Years active: 1930s-2020
- Known for: 1948 photo of Battle of the Little Bighorn survivors
- Spouse: Alice
- Parent(s): Emma and Amos Groethe
- Awards: William Groethe Day in South Dakota, photos displayed in the Smithsonian Institution

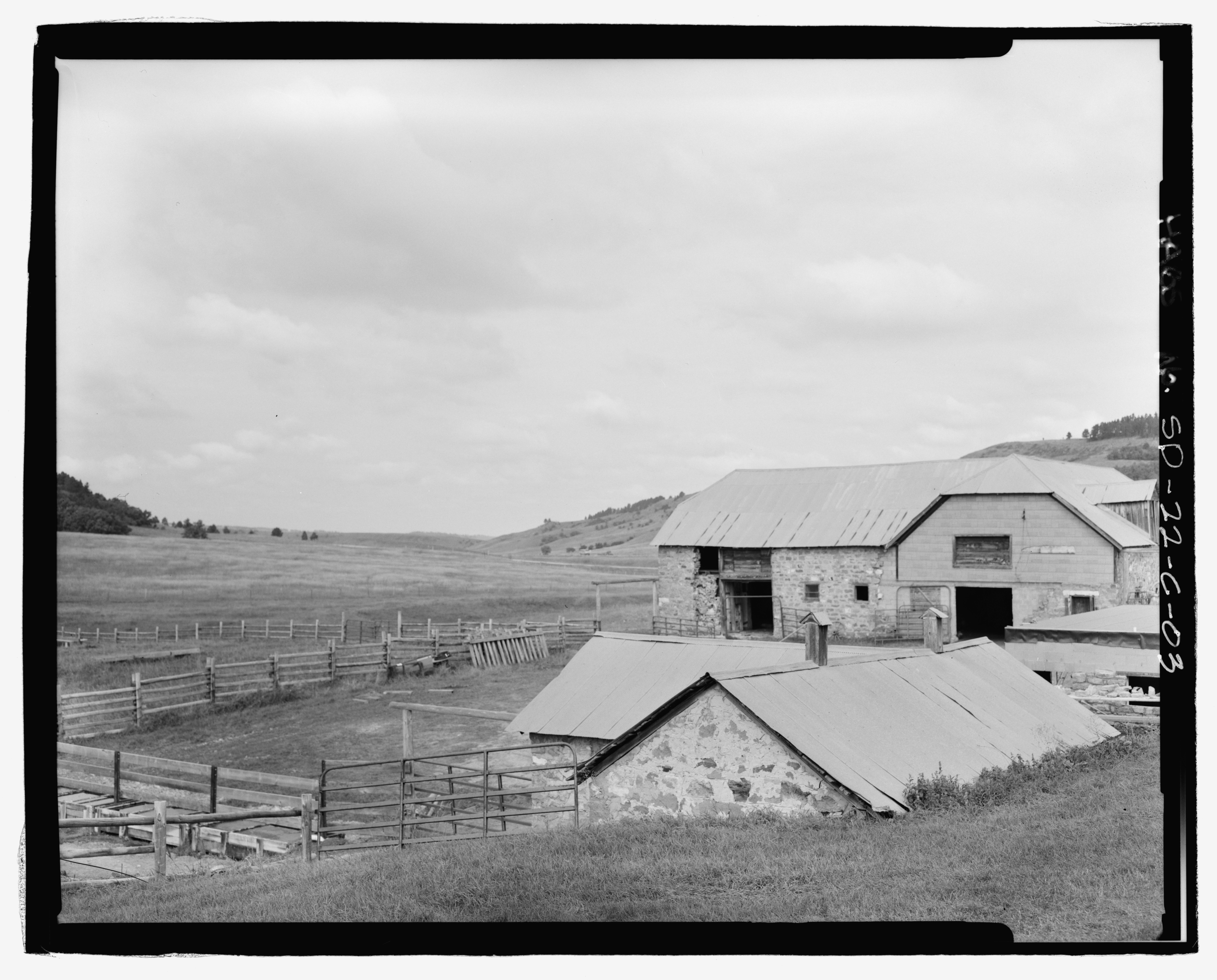
A photo of Lawrence County, South Dakota, taken by Groethe during work for the Historic American Buildings Survey

William McAndrew Groethe (November 2, 1923 – December 20, 2020) was an American photographer who photographed the last eight survivors of the 1876 Battle of the Little Bighorn on September 2, 1948.

People in the photo are Little Warrior, Pemmican, Little Soldier, Dewey Beard, High Eagle, Iron Hawk, Comes Again, and Nicholas Black Elk. John Sitting Bull, present in the photo though not a survivor, represented his adoptive father Sitting Bull. Groethe was the only professional photographer who attended the 1948 reunion of the survivors. The picture hangs in the Smithsonian Institution, and Groethe still sells autographed copies from his store First Photo in Rapid City, South Dakota.

Groethe lived in Rapid City, South Dakota. Over many decades, beginning in the 1930s, he took photographs of the construction of the Mount Rushmore National Monument, the South Dakota Badlands, the Lakota prophet Black Elk, and the Native American survivors of the Battle of the Little Bighorn. Groethe was mentored by fellow Rapid City photographers Carl Rise, a neighbor who gave him his first camera, and Bert Bell, with whom he began an apprenticeship at age 12. Groethe began selling his work at age 16. He served in World War II as a photo reconnaissance technician for the Army Air Force.

Bill Groethe's pictures are housed and displayed at the Rapid City Airport, the Smithsonian Institution, Mount Rushmore, Little Bighorn Battlefield National Monument Visitor Center, a theme park in Imachi City, Japan, and many other museums and private collections.

On August 17, 2009, Groethe was honored by the City of Rapid City and the State of South Dakota, which declared September 2, 2009, as William M. Groethe Day in honor of the 61st anniversary of the Little Bighorn photo.

He died in Rapid City, South Dakota in December 2020 at the age of 97.
