= Shane T. McCoy =

American photographer (born 1974)

- Born: 1974 (age 51–52); Redwood City, California, U.S.
- Occupations: Still and video photographer, graphic designer
- Website: www.usmarshals.photo

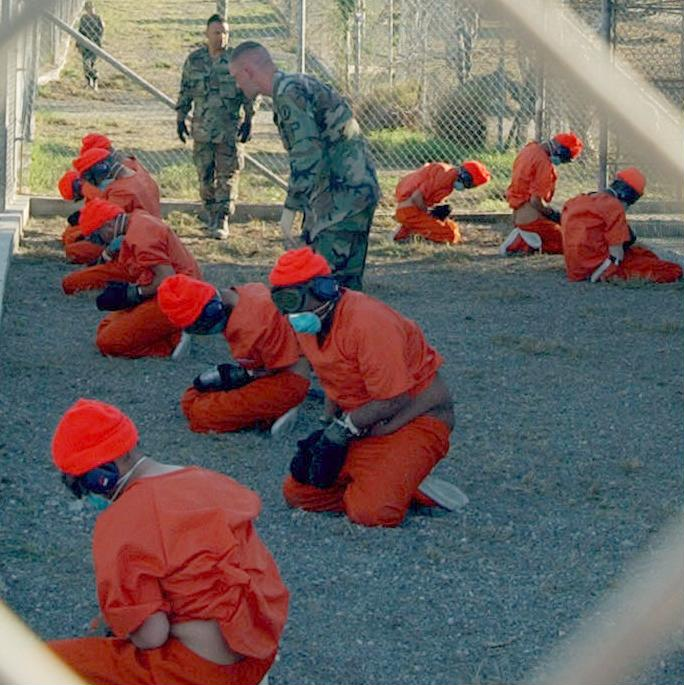
Detainees upon arrival at Camp X-Ray, January 2002, Photograph by Shane T. McCoy

Shane T. McCoy is an operational photographer for the U.S. Marshals Service, where he started working in 2009. His photos have been published in hundreds of publications worldwide. McCoy is responsible for covering all operational aspects of the multi-mission U.S. Marshals Service, and he has photographed thousands of arrests of people wanted on federal and local warrants.

Prior to working for the U.S. Marshals, McCoy spent more than 15 years as a combat photographer for the U.S. Navy. His positions in the Navy also included being the photo editor and lead photojournalist for the Navy's "All Hands" magazine for more than five years, video editor for "All Hands Television" for more than one year, and director of multimedia for one year. During his time in the Navy, his work took him to 35 countries and multiple active war zones. McCoy's most known series of photos was one that he shot as the first detainees arrived at Guantanamo Bay's Camp X-Ray in 2002.

While in the Navy, McCoy won awards in every category of the "Military Photographer of The Year" contest, including runner-up "Military Photographer of the Year" twice, winning third place three times, and receiving multiple honorable mentions. He also won first place in video editing and graphic design multiple times in military competitions for those categories. McCoy delivered the graduation speech for the Basic Still Photography course at the Defense Information School at Fort Meade, Maryland, in June 2006. During the 13-week course, students are trained to create professional visual information products.

McCoy has served as a mentor for the Department of Defense Worldwide Military Photography Workshop since 2004. He is one of the founding staff of the Shoot Off Visual Media Workshops, which are held for government and military photographers. In addition, he was one of the volunteers, known as the "Black Team" for the Eddie Adams Workshop for six years.
