= Ramona d'Viola =

American cyclist (born 1958)

- Born: October 30, 1958 (age 67); Chicago, Illinois, U.S.
- Known for: American cyclist, photojournalist, veteran of the United States Marine Corps

Ramona d'Viola (born October 30, 1958) is an American cyclist.

She was a member of the 1985 Women's US National Cycling Team and competed in the second Women's Tour de France known as the Tour Feminin. During 1984, 1985, and 1986, the women's Tour de France was held simultaneously with the men's race before being rescheduled, renamed (the Grand Boucle), and largely forgotten by the cycling community.

In 2003, d'Viola captained the first team of women to attempt crossing the Florida Straits from Marina Hemingway, Cuba to Key West by paddleboard (110 miles). The team was pulled from the water mid-crossing due to bad weather, however, a 2004 attempt proved successful. Acting as captain and alternate, the team of international world-class paddlers set a world record in the process. Founder of the Santa Cruz Paddleboard Union which hosts the annual Jay Moriarity Memorial Paddleboard Race, d'Viola is a photojournalist, veteran of the United States Marine Corps, and former crew member aboard the retired America's Cup yacht Stars and Stripes, USA-11.

== Photo gallery ==
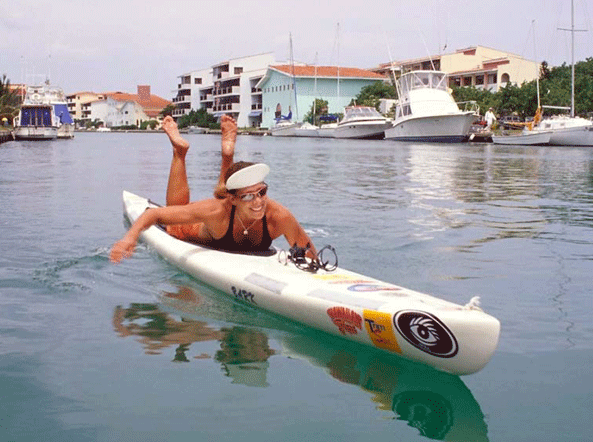
Full moon paddle from Marina Hemingway, Cuba en route to Key West, Florida—2003. (photo Aline Paterson)

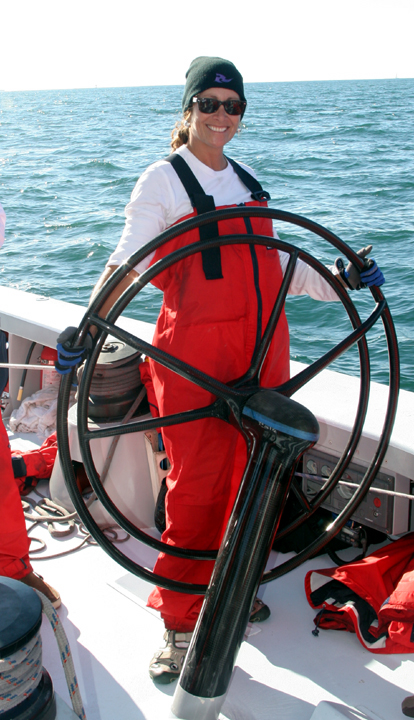
At the helm of Stars&Stripes USA-34, September 2006
