= Scott Strazzante =

Scott Strazzante (born March 11, 1964) is an American photojournalist at the San Francisco Chronicle. As a member of the Chicago Tribune staff, he co-won the 2008 Pulitzer Prize for Investigative Reporting for a series about faulty government regulation of dangerously defective toys, cribs and car seats.

== Education ==
He grew up in Chicago and graduated from Ripon College, where he majored in business management and art (1982–86).

== Career ==
He has been published in National Geographic Magazine, Mother Jones Magazine, Sports Illustrated, and other publications. Strazzante's Common Ground project has been published in National Geographic and made into a video by MediaStorm.

He is a former Illinois Press Photographer Association president (2001–2010) and National Press Photographers Association Region 5 Director and Associate Director (1999–2005).

Strazzante is a street photographer, using his iPhone with Hipstamatic app.

== Awards ==
He is an eleven-time Illinois Photographer of the Year. He was awarded National Newspaper Photographer of the Year in 2000 and National Newspaper Photographer of the Year runner-up in 2007.
