= Bill Thomas (American writer, born 1934) =

American author and photojournalist (1934–2009)

Bill Thomas (November 11, 1934 – June 3, 2009) was an American author and photojournalist.

Thomas was born November 11, 1934, to William Roy Thomas and Margaret Elizabeth (Crabtree). He was born on the family farm near Glendale, Kentucky.

While attending Western Kentucky University, Thomas reported for the Park City Daily News. Upon graduation, he accepted a commission in the US Army Reserve and trained in 1958 at Fort Holabird in Baltimore, Maryland. He was later employed by United Press International in Louisville, Kentucky, and then The Cincinnati Enquirer in 1962. He was promoted to Travel Editor at the Enquirer.

Thomas left the Enquirer in 1966 to freelance for a number of newspapers and magazines. His work focused in the areas of outdoors, travel, and human interest, and was published in Field & Stream, Woodall's Trailer Travel, Outdoor Life, The Saturday Evening Post, and many other periodicals.

He published his first book in 1974.

In 1976, Thomas received the National Geographic Award for Photography.

== Books ==
- Tripping in America: Off the Beaten Track (1974)
- Eastern Trips & Trails (1975)
- Mid-America Trips and Trails (1975)
- The Swamp (1976)
- The Complete World of Kites (1977)
- Lakeside Recreation Areas (1977)
- American Rivers: A Natural History (1978)
- The Island (1981)
- The Brown County Book (1981)
- Talking with the Animals: How to Communicate with Wildlife (1985)
- How You Can Make $50,000 a Year as a Nature Photojournalist (1986)
- Natural Chicago, with Phyllis Thomas (1986)
- Natural New York, with Phyllis Thomas (1988)
- Indiana Off the Beaten Path (1989)
- Natural Los Angeles, with Phyllis Thomas (1989)
- Natural Washington (1991)
- Wild Woodlands: The Old-Growth Forests of America (1992)
- Travel America's Past and Future: The Travel Guide to Americas Living Restorations and Futuristic Attractions (1993)
- The River Purple (2002)
