= Jerry Berndt (photographer) =

American photographer

Jerry Berndt (1943–2013) was an American photojournalist and documentary photographer. He made work about the Combat Zone, Boston in the late 1960s. Berndt has posthumously had solo exhibitions at the Centre national des arts plastiques in Paris and the Deichtorhallen in Hamburg. His work is held in the collection of the Museum of Modern Art in New York City.

== Life and work ==
Berndt was born in Milwaukee, Wisconsin, USA into a working-class family.

He was based in Boston, Massachusetts on and off for three decades, beginning in the late 1960s. He was a self-taught photographer who made work about an area of Boston known as the Combat Zone (1967–1970); a homeless shelter on Boston's Long Island in the early 1980s; the living conditions of people in San Salvador (1984), and Haiti at a time of civil unrest (1986–1991); the First Nagorno-Karabakh War in Armenia (1993–1994); and orphans from the Rwandan genocide (2003–2004).

Berndt moved to Paris in the late 1990s. He was found dead in his Paris studio on July 10, 2013, probably from a heart attack, aged 69.

== Publications ==
=== Books by Berndt ===
- Missing Persons the Homeless. Boston: Many Voices, 1986.
- Armenia: Portraits of Survival. Self-published, 1994. With an introduction by Donald E. Miller.
- Insight. Göttingen, Germany: Steidl, 2008. Edited by Felix Hoffman and Maik Schlüter. ISBN 9783865217257.
- Beautiful America: Protest, Politics and Everyday Culture in the USA, 1968–1980. Göttingen, Germany: Steidl, 2018. Edited by Maik Schlüter. ISBN 978-3-86930-898-2.

=== Books with contributions by Berndt ===
- Armenia: Portraits of Survival and Hope. University of California Press, 2003. Text by Donald E. Miller and Lorna Touryan Miller, photographs by Berndt. ISBN 9780520234925.
- Orphans of the Rwanda Genocide. Text by Donald E. Miller and Lorna Touryan Miller and photographs by Berndt. Pasadena, CA: New Vision, 2004.

== Exhibitions ==
=== Solo exhibitions ===
- Jerry Berndt: Beautiful America, Centre national des arts plastiques, Paris, 2016
- Beautiful America, Deichtorhallen, Hamburg, Germany, 2020–21

=== Group exhibitions ===
- Photography: Recent Acquisitions, Museum of Modern Art, New York, 1987

== Collections ==
- Museum of Modern Art, New York: 1 print (as of 3 January 2022)
