= Boris Yaro =

American photojournalist (1938–2020)

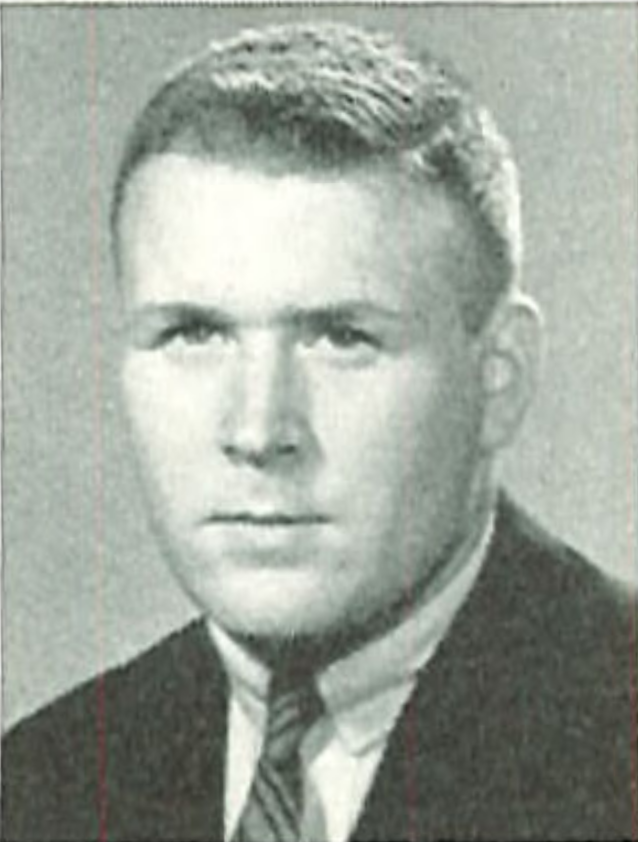
- Yaro in 1959
- Born: Boris Anthony Yaroslavski; April 19, 1938; Des Moines, Iowa, U.S.
- Died: March 11, 2020 (aged 81); Northridge, Los Angeles, California, U.S.
- Resting place: Mount Sinai Simi Valley, Simi Valley, California
- Education: University of Iowa
- Notable work: Photographs of the assassination of Robert F. Kennedy

Boris Yaro (born Boris Anthony Yaroslavski; April 19, 1938 – March 11, 2020) was an American photojournalist who was best known for his photographs of the 1968 assassination of Robert F. Kennedy.

== Biography ==
Boris Anthony Yaroslavski was born on April 19, 1938, in Des Moines, Iowa. He and his brother Max abbreviated their last name to Yaro as children, after many years of using it as a nickname. Yaro attended Des Moines Technical High School, where he studied commercial art and developed an interest in photography.

After graduating from high school, Yaro served in the United States Army as a photographer from 1956 to 1957. He studied photography at the State University of Iowa (now the University of Iowa) for four years, where he was a member of Alpha Epsilon Pi. He did not graduate; Yaro recalled in 2007 that his father's health prevented him from completing his studies, and he had already been working as a stringer for the Associated Press.

Yaro began working as a photojournalist for the Los Angeles Times in the mid-1960s. He photographed the Watts riots in 1965, in one case narrowly avoiding injury while photographing two people being shot. By 1968, he was a staff photographer for the paper's San Gabriel Valley bureau, covering breaking stories and closely monitoring the activities of the local police and fire departments. His colleague Rick Meyer recalled that Yaro was always sharply dressed, and kept multiple radio scanners on his nightstand.

On the afternoon of June 4, 1968, Yaro was ill with an upset stomach and left the newsroom early. He felt better in the evening, and while watching TV coverage of the Democratic presidential primary results, decided to drive to the Ambassador Hotel and photograph candidate Robert F. Kennedy. Yaro admired Kennedy, and brought his personal Nikkormat FTn camera to take photographs for his own collection. In the early hours of June 5, as Yaro waited to photograph Kennedy exiting the hotel, Kennedy was assassinated in the hotel's kitchen. Yaro took 6 photographs of the immediate aftermath, including a photograph of Kennedy in the arms of busboy Juan Romero.

Yaro's photograph of the dying Kennedy ran on the front page of the Times the next morning, and is included in the permanent collections of the J. Paul Getty Museum and the Museum of Modern Art. In an interview in 2018, Yaro expressed that "I hate that damn picture. I had no copy in the house. I didn't like it then, and I'm not crazy about it now." Pulitzer Prize-winning colleague Don Bartletti argued that Yaro's photographs were worthy of the 1969 Pulitzer Prize for Spot News Photography, which was awarded to "Saigon Execution" by Eddie Adams.

Yaro continued working for the Times for the rest of his career. He covered the aftermath of the 1971 San Fernando earthquake, and mentored actor Daryl Anderson for his role as photojournalist Dennis "Animal" Price in the TV series Lou Grant. In 1981, Yaro photographed an interaction between boxer Muhammad Ali and a suicidal man in a Miracle Mile office building, where Ali persuaded the man to go to the hospital with him.

Yaro switched from film to digital photography in the mid-1990s, and retired from the Times in 2001. Yaro died on March 11, 2020, in his home in Northridge, at the age of 81. He is buried in the Mount Sinai Simi Valley cemetery in Simi Valley, California.

== Personal life ==
Yaro was married to Jill Noskin, with whom he had two children.

== Selected photographs ==
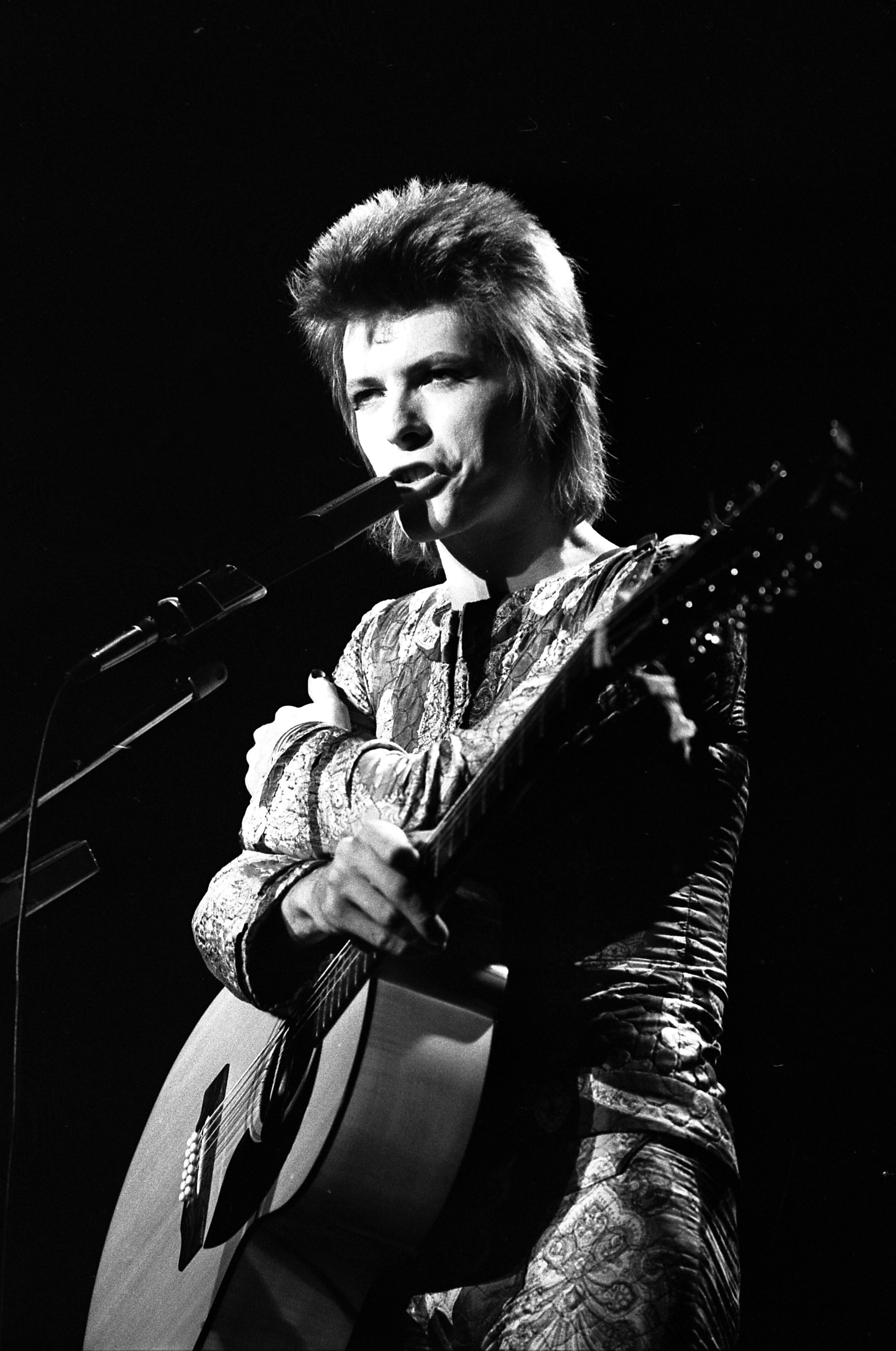
David Bowie as Ziggy Stardust at the Santa Monica Civic Auditorium, 1972

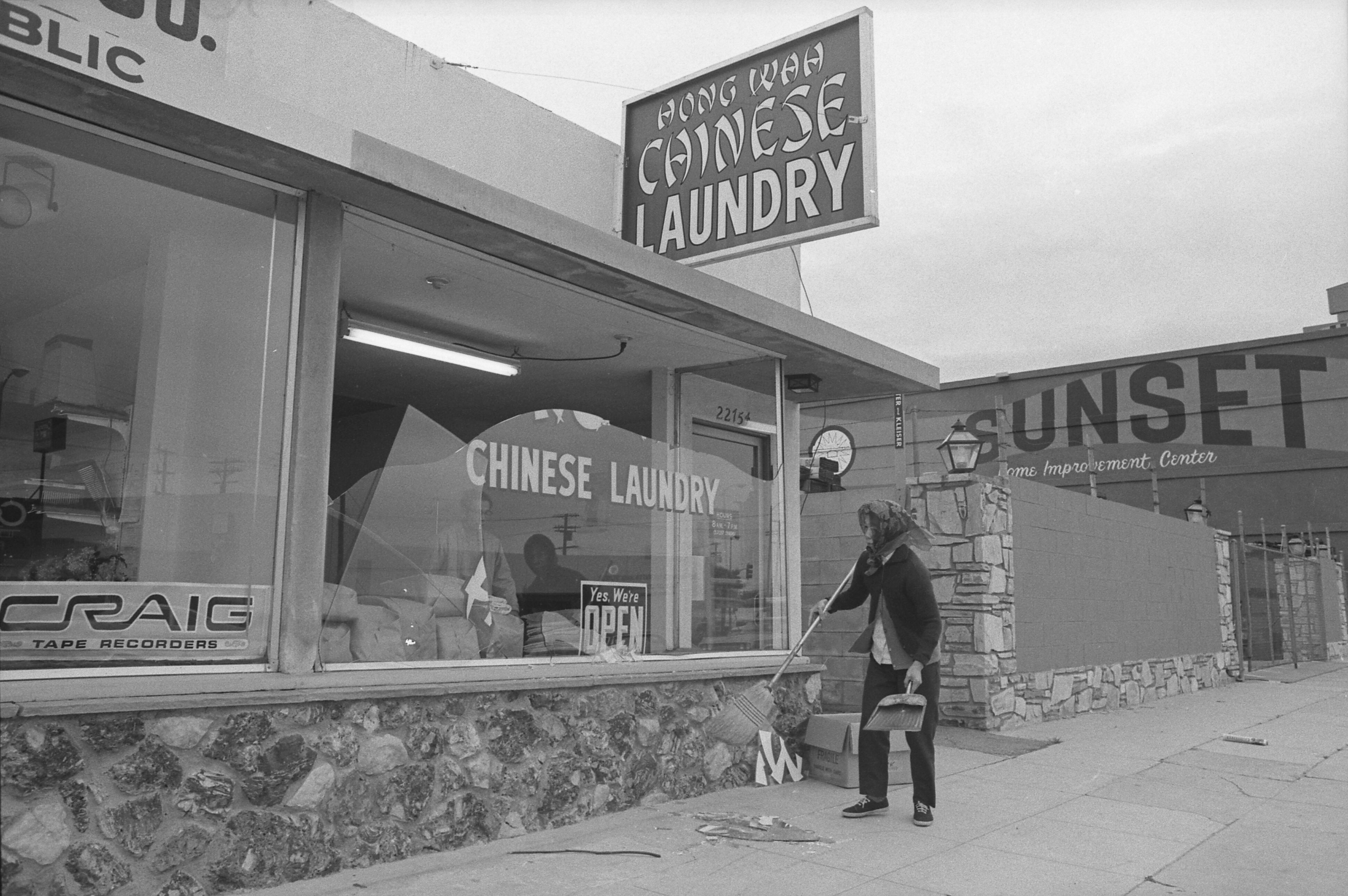
Broken windows on Ventura Boulevard after the 1973 Point Mugu earthquake

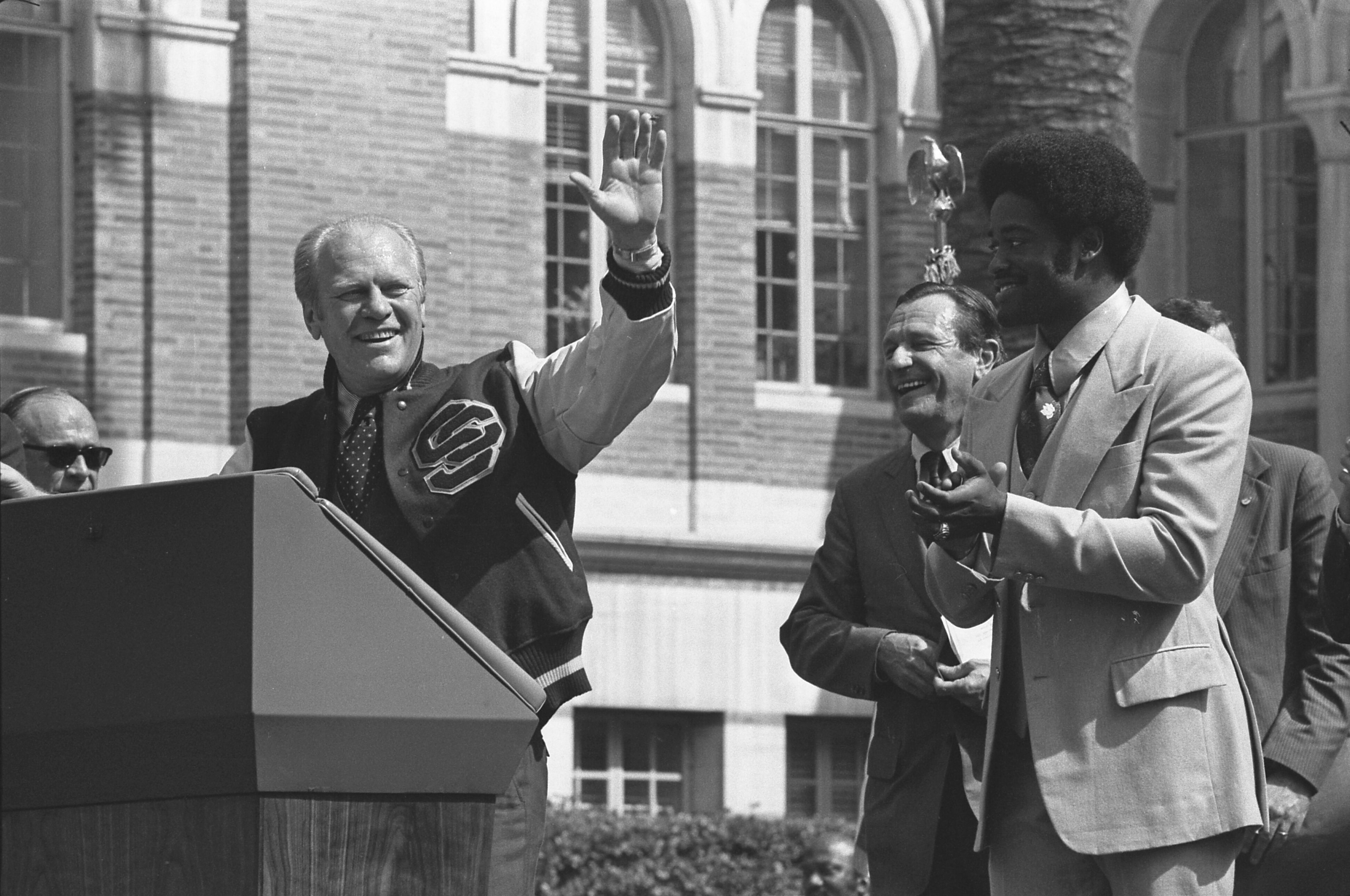
President Gerald Ford speaking at USC, 1976

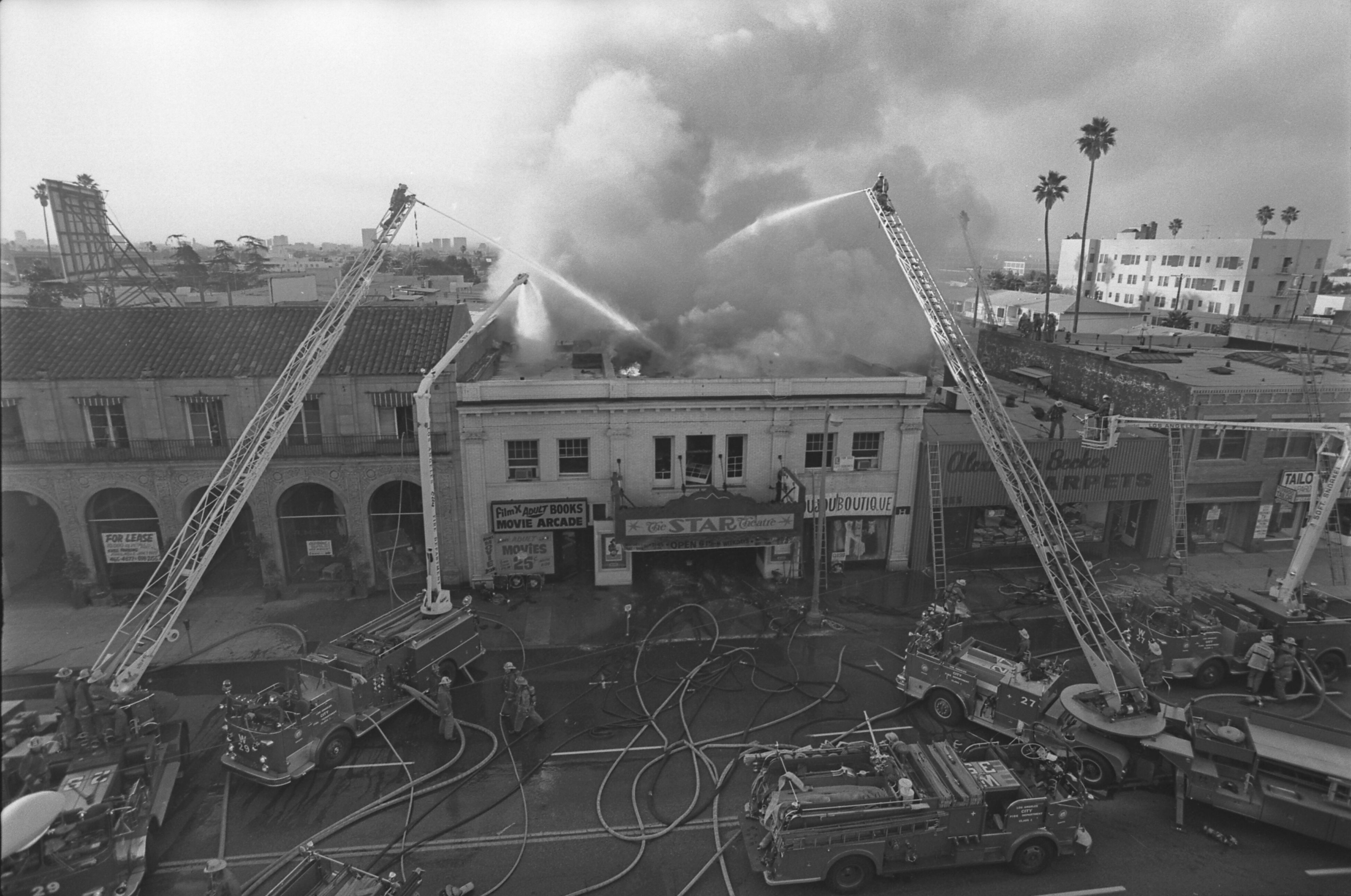
Firefighting efforts at the Star Theatre on Hollywood Boulevard, 1976

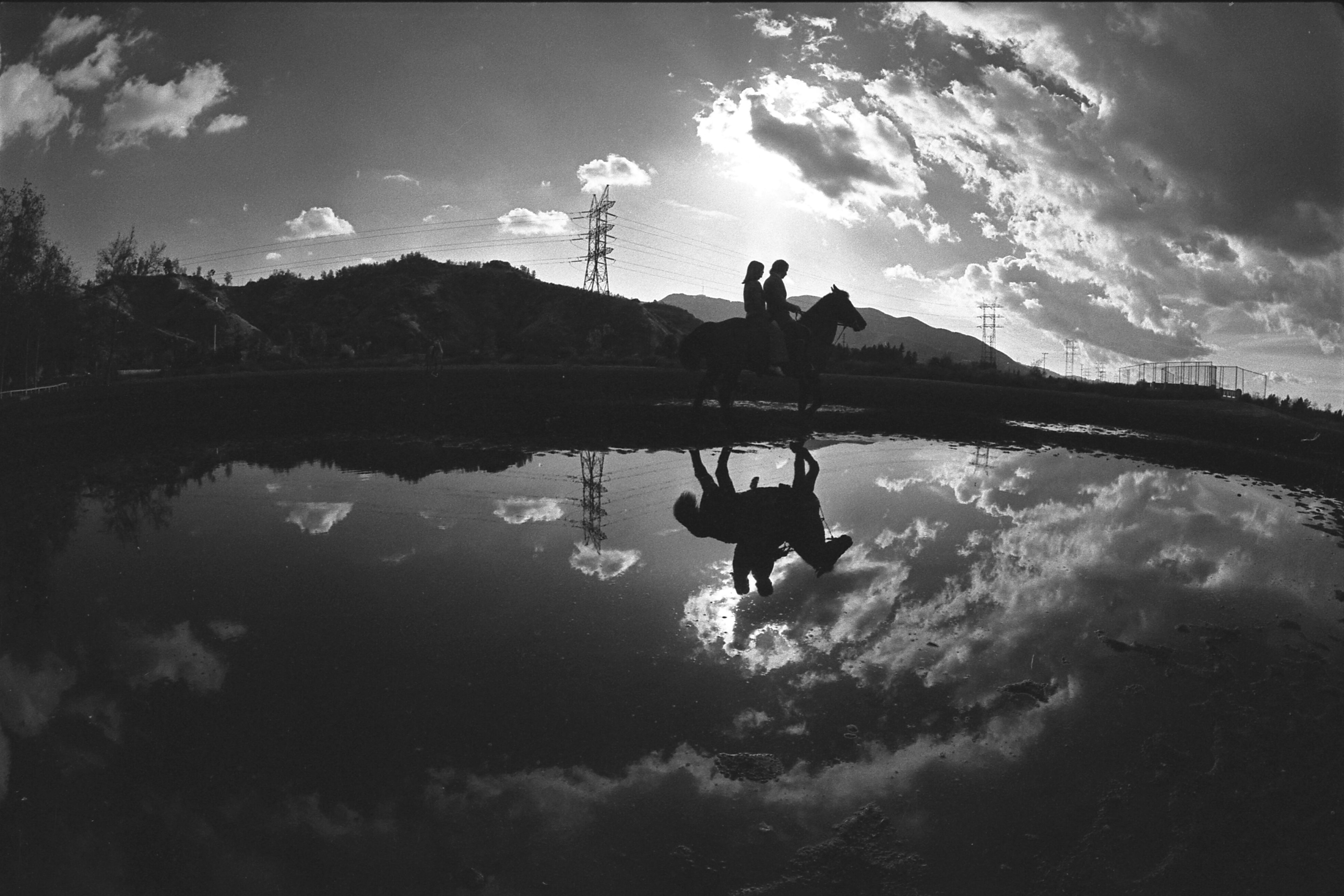
Couple on horseback in Griffith Park, 1977

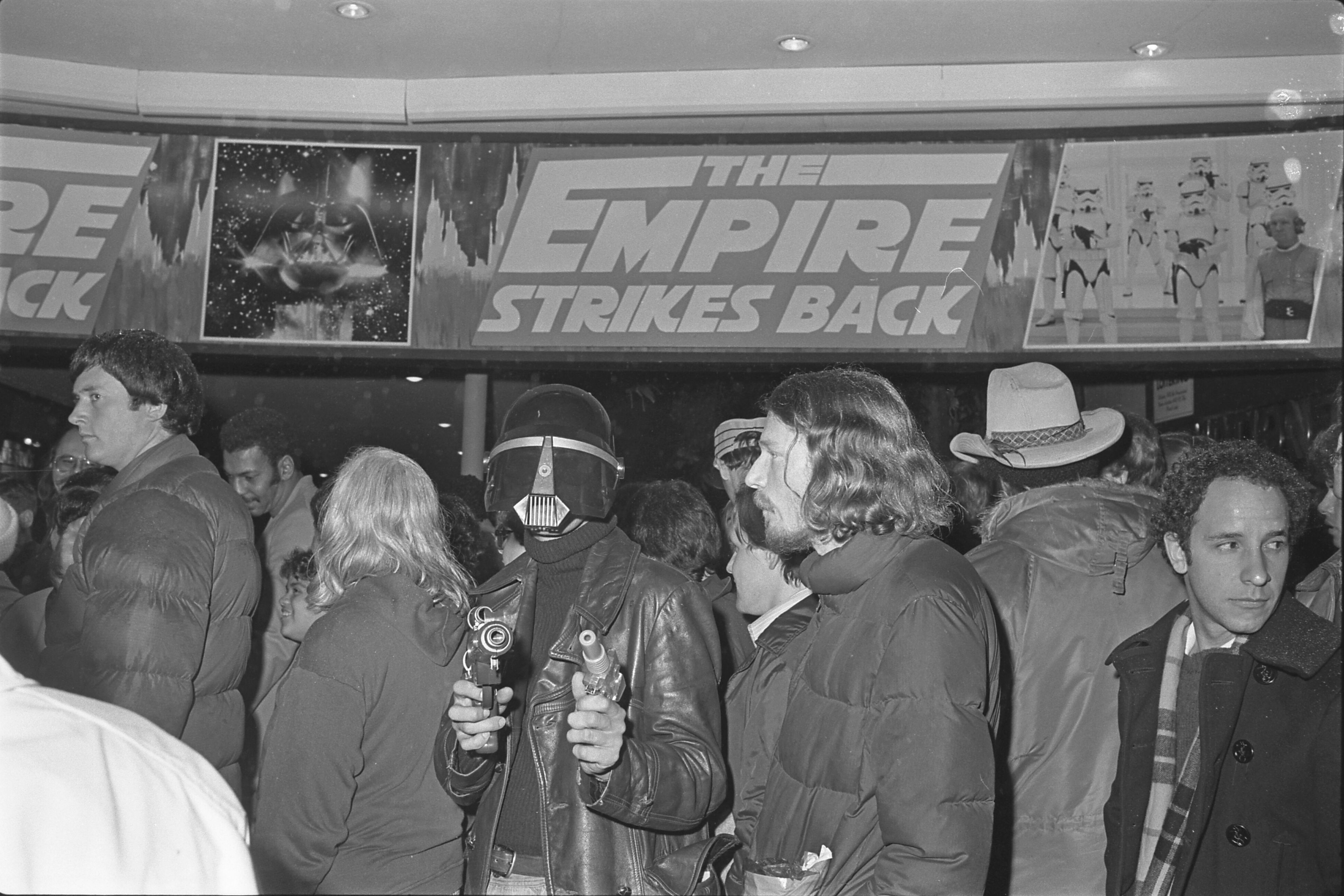
The Empire Strikes Back audience members in costume, 1980
