= Tom Marcello =

American photographer

Tom Marcello has been a jazz photojournalist since the mid 1970s. His photos have appeared as album covers, in liner notes, in press kits and in the news. Among his subjects are Woody Shaw, Zoot Sims, Dexter Gordon, Sonny Stitt, Marvin Peterson, Charles Mingus, the Heath Brothers, and Kenny Washington.
