= Brad Mangin =

American photographer

Brad Mangin is a Bay Area freelance sports photographer. Mangin has done eight cover shots for Sports Illustrated. Mangin graduated from San Jose State in a degree in photojournalism.
