= MB Caschetta =

American writer and blogger

Mary Beth Caschetta (born August 30, 1966) is an Italian-American writer and blogger best known for her acclaimed novel, Miracle Girls, and her blog Literary Rejections On Display.

== Career ==
=== Literary Rejections On Display ===
Caschetta began the blog Literary Rejections On Display anonymously in 2007 identifying herself only as Writer, Rejected. The blog was initially composed solely of Caschetta's rejections from literary journals with all personal information crossed out. As the blog gained in popularity she began to post anonymous submissions from readers that had been sent to her.

Caschetta also used the blog to anonymously chronicle her own journey with her novel, and her efforts to obtain an agent and publish the work. Caschetta put the blog on hiatus in 2012 before returning in 2014 with the news that she had sold her novel. On November 7, 2014, she wrote a blog post in which she revealed herself as MB Caschetta, and the novel she had been trying to publish as Miracle Girls.

=== Fiction and Non-Fiction ===
In 1996, Caschetta published a collection of short stories Lucy on the West Coast and Other Lesbian Short Fiction under the name Mary Beth Caschetta.

In 2014, Caschetta published Miracle Girls with Engine Press. Miracle Girls won a 2014 gold medal IPPY Award, was a finalist in the Religious Fiction category and honorable mention in the LGBT Fiction category for the IndieFab Book of the Year Awards, and in the spiritual category for the Paris Book Festival, Amsterdam Book Festival, and the San Francisco Book Festival. It was also a finalist for Lambda Literary Award in Lesbian Fiction]. It was also an Honorable Mention selection for the Spiritual Category of the 2015 Los Angeles Book Festival and the general fiction category at the New York Book Festival.

Caschetta's second collection of short stories Pretend I'm Your Friend was published in 2016.

Caschetta's memoir in essays, A Cheerleader's Guide to Spiritual Enlightenment was published in November 2022. Essays include her childhood, AIDS activism, medical writing career, belief in God, disinheritance, and long COVID. For Cheerleader's Guide, she won The Memoir Award For Books in 2023 in the Essay Category

== Personal life ==
Caschetta is the youngest of four children with three older brothers in an Italian-American family. In 2011, she wrote an essay about her physician father's decision to disinherit her for The New York Times, and in 2023, she wrote about her brothers' decision to re-inherit her, also for The New York Times.

Caschetta has been married to advice columnist and playwright Meryl Cohn since 2004.

On May 20, 2021, Caschetta revealed on the Literary Rejections On Display blog that she had been diagnosed with COVID-19. Caschetta subsequently revealed that she was suffering from Long COVID.
