= Justin Merriman =

American photojournalist

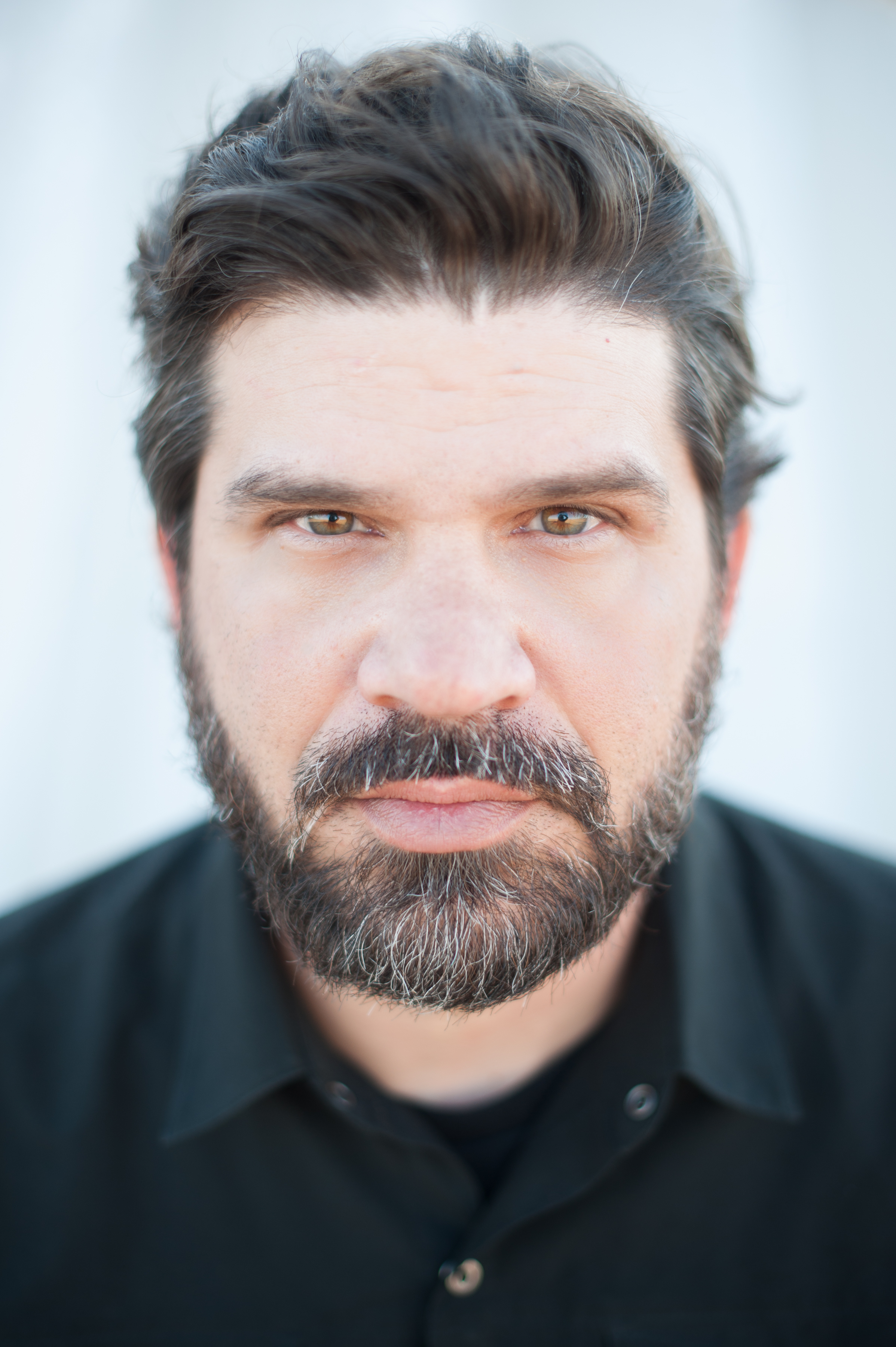

Justin Merriman is an American photojournalist. He is a staff photographer at the Pittsburgh Tribune-Review, in Pittsburgh, Pennsylvania.

In 2014 he won an "award of excellence" in the Pictures of the Year International awards of the Donald W. Reynolds Journalism Institute for his coverage of unrest in Cairo, and in 2016 he took a 'distinguished visual' award in the Keystone Awards of the Pennsylvania Newspaper Association. In 2018 he was one of twenty-seven recipients of an honourable mention in the Atlanta Photojournalism Seminar.
