= Werner Wolff (photographer) =

German-born American photojournalist

Werner Wolff (11 June 1911 – 26 January 2002) was a German-born American photojournalist known primarily for his work with the Black Star agency from 1945 to the late 1980s. Born in Mannheim, Germany in 1911, Wolff emigrated to New York City in 1936, initially working for Alfred Eisenstaedt as a darkroom technician and then starting his own photographic agency, Camera Features. After a brief stint in the U.S. Army Signal Corps during World War II, Wolff became a correspondent for the weekly Army magazine, YANK. Wolff reported on major campaigns in Italy and was one of the first to photograph Hitler's mountain retreat in Berchtesgaden after its capture by the Allies.

After the war, Wolff returned to New York City and began his career with Black Star. Wolff photographed virtually everything, from famous (and not so famous) people to newsworthy events to technically challenging subjects. His work appeared in the pages of many publications, including Time, Life, Ebony and many others. Wolff also worked for many corporations and educational institutions; his photographs appeared in external publications such as annual reports and alumni magazines. Wolff also documented the official foreign travels of US presidents: Dwight D. Eisenhower's eleven-nation tour in 1959, John F. Kennedy's trip to France in 1961, and Lyndon B. Johnson's meeting with the South Vietnamese leaders on Guam in 1967.

Wolff married Alice H. Eckstein in 1941 before he joined the US Army (allowing him to become a naturalized citizen). He returned from the Army in 1946 and raised two sons, Steven and Mark. Wolff stopped accepting assignments from Black Star in the 1980s, but continued to take photographs of various subjects. He died in 2002 as a result of a long-term illness, leaving behind an enormous and rich portfolio.

Werner Wolff's photographs were donated to the Ryerson Image Centre in 2009 along with his negatives, contact sheets, tear sheets, and notebooks. The Wolff archive is currently housed alongside the Black Star print collection at Toronto Metropolitan University.
