= Gary L. Howe =

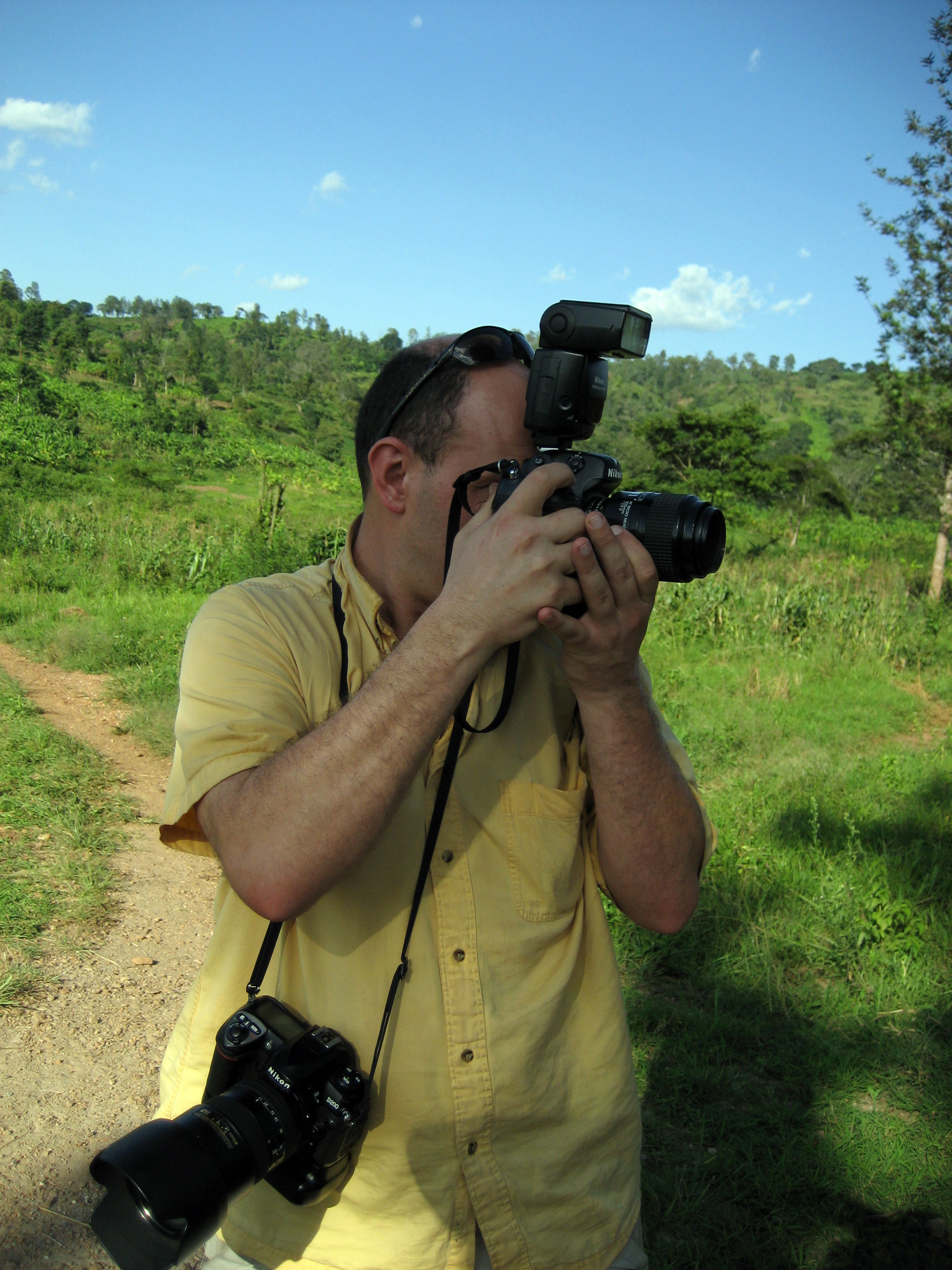
Gary L. Howe

Gary L. Howe is a photojournalist who has worked on assignment for the New York Times, Utne Reader and [Traverse (magazine)|Traverse Magazine]. He has contributed much of his personal work to documenting and promoting Fair Trade coffee with images from Chiapas, Mexico, Bolivia and, most recently, Rwanda.

As an independent journalist, Howe publishes many personal projects on his BLOG, Life on Earth. Following a trend in online reporting, Howe also produces audio reports to create multi-media slide shows. Slurping a Cup of Fair Trade is a 3-minute slide show about the Cup of Fair Trade cupping competition held in Bolivia's Yungas Valley in 2006. Howe's radio pieces have been produced for the community radio program Radio Anyway on WNMC in Traverse City, Michigan

In February 2007, Howe traveled to Rwanda to photograph coffee growers and cooperatives with Cooperative Coffees and Just Coffee.
