= Rita Reed =

American photojournalist and professor

- Citizenship: American
- Education: Undergraduate degree from Southwest Missouri State University & a master's degree in journalism from the University of Missouri
- Occupations: Author, photojournalist, professor
- Writing career
- Language: English
- Subject: Photojournalism
- Notable works: Growing Up Gay: The Sorrows and Joys of Gay and Lesbian Adolescence
- Notable awards: 1993 Nikon Sabbatical Grant, 2014 O.O. McIntyre Professorship, 2015 National Press Photographers Association's Morris Berman Citation

Rita Reed is an American photojournalist and professor. She is currently a University of Missouri journalism professor, where has held the O.O. McIntyre Professorship in 2014. She is also known as the author of Growing Up Gay: The Sorrows and Joys of Gay and Lesbian Adolescence.

== Biography ==
Reed attended University of Missouri, where she received her degree in journalism. In addition, she also received her undergraduate degree from Southwest Missouri State University.

Reed has worked as a newspaper photojournalist for the Minneapolis Star Tribune and at The Gazette in Iowa, where she had 20 years of combined journalism experience.

With statistics suggesting high suicide rates among gay teens and a Congressional effort to suppress the finding in 1989, Reed set out to document gay and lesbian teen life. The effort became a 14-page special section in the Star-Tribune. Reed's 45-picture essay, according to The Advocate, catalyzed much organizing and consciousness raising in the Twin Cities.

Openly gay in the early 1990s Reed was a member of the newly formed National Lesbian and Gay Journalists Association.

In 1992, Reed covered the Bosnian War and was captured with two others by hostile forces and held overnight until the United States Consulate intervened. Her photography is inclusive of women and minorities. Her book, Growing Up Gay, contains seven years worth of documentary pictures and the text is quoted from the photographic subjects. Reed followed Amy Grahn and Jamie Nabozny, documenting important moments in their lives.

Today, Reed teaches photojournalism at University of Missouri. In addition to being a professor, she also oversees the annual College Photographer of the Year competition run through her university.

== Awards ==
In 1993, Reed was awarded the Nikon Sabbatical Grant for after publishing Growing Up Gay: The Sorrows and Joys of Gay and Lesbian Adolescence. which was published by W. W. Norton in 1997. Author Frances Ann Day calls "Growing Up Gay", extraordinary and beautifully written book of photography the follows the lives of two gay teens for several years. The book is cited in "The A to Z of the Lesbian Liberation Movement: Still the Rage In 1999", as providing a "touchstone for lesbian adolescents". And the book appeared on The Advocate's list of best sellers in 1998 and made the magazine's list for its gift guide.

Reed was named the Minnesota Photographer of the Year. In 2014, Reed's outstanding teaching performance was rewarded by the Missouri School of Journalism. $10,000 in additional salary was given over the course of the upcoming year as part of The O.O. McIntyre Professorship Award.

Reed was awarded once more in 2015 with the National Press Photographers Association's Morris Berman Citation, an award honoring a previous National Press Photographers Association (NPPA) president. The NPPA associates nominate the recipient based on the impact he or she has made on the organization.
