= Wilensky =

Wilensky is a surname. Notable people with the surname include:

- Adam Wilensky, American actor
- Amy Wilensky (born 1969), American writer
- Gail Wilensky (born 1943), American health economist
- Harold Wilensky (1923–2011), American organizational sociologist
- Mike Wilensky (born 1983), American politician
- Robert Wilensky (1951–2013), American computer scientist
