= David Pokress =

American photojournalist

David L. Pokress is an American photojournalist. In the 1980s, he worked for New York's Newsday. In 1992 he worked for Esquire. He is currently a photo assignment editor at the Daily News in New York, and has served as the President of the New York Press Photographers Association since 2011.
