= Wilson Hicks =

American journalist, author (1896/7–1970)

Wilson Hicks (1896/7 - 1970) was an American journalist and author who made major contributions to the advancement of photojournalism in the period of the 1930s through the 1950s. After working for the Associated Press from 1929 to 1937 he embarked on his most significant period of work, as picture editor of Life magazine. Beginning in 1937, soon after the magazine’s inception, within three years he had built a staff of 40. It was the most accomplished pool of photojournalists assembled by any publication up to that point. Hicks later was named executive editor of Life, a position he held until leaving the magazine in 1952. Following his departure from Life, Hicks joined the faculty of the University of Miami, bringing photojournalism education to that institution. His book “Words and Pictures: An Introduction to Photojournalism” was published in 1952.

Hicks died in 1970 at the age of 73.
