= Matthew Knisely =

American photojournalist and author

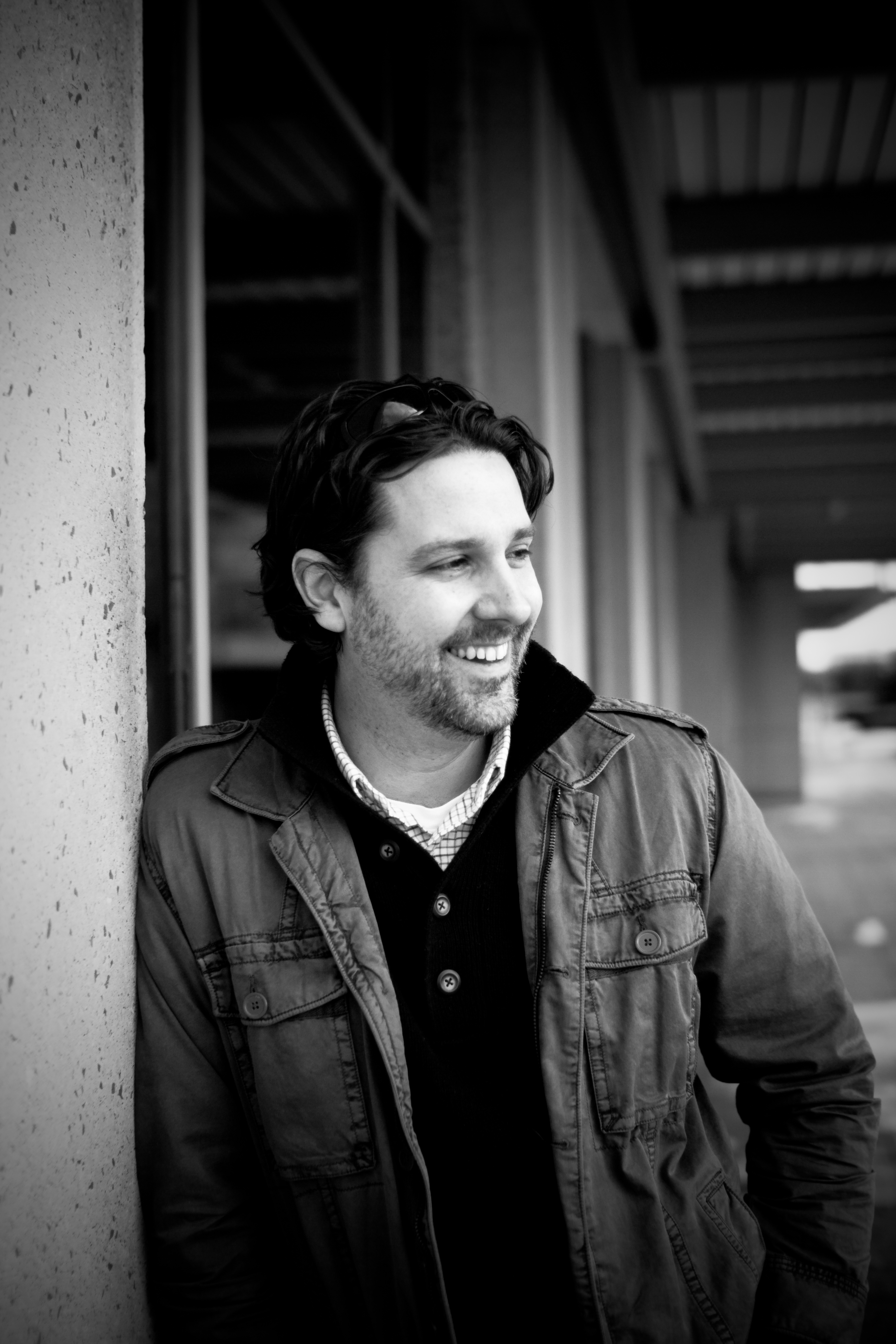
- Knisely (2011)

Personal details
- Born: August 8, 1974 (age 52) York, Pennsylvania, U.S.
- Spouse: Dana Knisely (m. 2002)
- Children: 2
- Education: Millersville University
- Occupation: Photographer, Creative Director, and author
- Profession: Journalism
- Website: Official website

Matthew Knisely is an American TV photojournalist and author.

== Biography ==
Born in York, Pennsylvania, Knisely attended Indiana University of Pennsylvania and majored in journalism at Millersville University. He also studied speech and rhetoric at University of Lincoln. He began his TV photojournalism career at WGAL-TV and WHTM-TV in Pennsylvania. He later worked at the BBC, where he covered the talks and announcement leading up to the Good Friday Agreement, as well as Serbia's unilateral ceasefire and partial retreat from Kosovo. When he returned to the US, he worked as a reporter in the Midwest. In 2002, he joined KTUL-TV as a photojournalist in Tulsa before moving to KNXV-TV in Phoenix, where he and correspondent Jonathan Elias reported on the 2002 Beltway sniper attacks.

In 2003, he left KNXV to become the Director of Photography at KMSP/WFTC-TV in Minneapolis. In 2005, he covered the death of Pope John Paul II, the Papal Conclave, and the election of Pope Benedict XVI. In 2008, he left KMSP/WFTC-TV to start Good World Creative and to serve as Director of Communications and Media for Lawton First Assembly in Oklahoma. In 2013, he was also working as the Creative Director and Chief Storyteller for ACTIVE Network and Fellowship One, and was part of the creative coworking space WELD. He was also Creative Director of Video Production for Gateway Church in 2014. In 2013, he published Framing Faith with Thomas Nelson.

== Awards ==
Year	Award	Awarding body	Result	Notes	Ref
2003	Upper Midwest Chapter Emmy for "News Special"	National Television Academy	Won	As part of the Fox 9 Investigations team	
2004	Upper Midwest Chapter Emmy for "Audio - News"	National Television Academy	Won	For 2003/2004 Composite	
2004	Upper Midwest Chapter Emmy for "Editing - News, within 24-hours"	National Television Academy	Won	For 2003/2004 Composite	
2004	Daily General Assignment News Photojournalism	Best of the West Contest	Runner-up		
2004	Minnesota Broadcasters Awards for "Documentary/Investigative"	Associated Press	Honorable mention	For The Meth Crisis as part of the KMSP-TV team	
2005	Upper Midwest Chapter Emmy for "Lighting - Studio"	National Television Academy	Won	For FOX 9 Image	
2006	Best of Photojournalism for "Spot News"	National Press Photographers Association	Finalist	For Holy Smoke	
2006	Best of Photojournalism for "Team Entry"	National Press Photographers Association	Finalist	For A Gas to Go Fast with the KMSP team	
2006	Upper Midwest Chapter Emmy for "Technical Achievement"	National Television Academy	Finalist	For Getting the Gig	
2007	Station of the Year	National Press Photographers Association	Runner-up	As part of the KMSP-TV team	
2007	Best of Photojournalism for "TV News Feature"	National Press Photographers Association	3rd Place	For Camp K	
2007	Upper Midwest Chapter Emmy for "Lighting-Studio"	National Television Academy	Won	For Composite	
2007	Upper Midwest Chapter Emmy for "Magazine Program"	National Television Academy	Won	For Signature Stories with Kara Owens	
2008	Best of Photojournalism for "Photo Essay Finalists"	National Press Photographers Association	Runner-up	For Home Opener & Herb	
2008	Best of Photojournalism for "In-Depth/Series"	National Press Photographers Association	Honorable mention	For Courage Under Fire	
2008	Best of Photojournalism competition for "News Feature"	National Press Photographers Association	Finalist	For Courage Under Fire	
