= Brian Walski =

American photographer (born 1958)

- Born: 1958 (age 67–68); Illinois, United States
- Occupation: Photojournalism
- Notable credit: Won the California Press Photographers Association's 2001 Photographer of the Year

Brian Walski is a professional photographer who was accused in 2003 of altering a news photograph, which he later admitted to. Until the incident, he was a staff photographer at the Los Angeles Times. Previously, he had won the California Press Photographers Association's 2001 Photographer of the Year.

== Biography ==
Walski was born in Illinois and grew up in Chicago. He studied journalism at Northern Illinois University. He has worked as a photographer since 1980 starting his career at the Albuquerque Journal, Patriot-Ledger in Quincy, MA, and the Boston Herald. He spent 12 years on staff at the Herald until he joined the Los Angeles Times in September 1998. During his career as a photojournalist, he covered stories ranging from local news to the Gulf War, the Africa famine, Northern Ireland, the Kashmiri conflict and the crisis in the Balkans.

== Iraq photo controversy ==
On March 30, 2003 Walski was on assignment for the Los Angeles Times, covering the 2003 Invasion of Iraq near Basra. He took a series of photographs that day of British soldiers telling Iraqi civilians to take cover. When he later viewed them, he decided to use his computer to combine two of the images that had been taken a few seconds apart into a single image with better overall composition. He then sent the pictures to Los Angeles Times staff who posted them on the internal photo sharing system for various media outlets owned by the Tribune News Corporation.

On March 31, media across the country ran the image, including the Los Angeles Times on the front page, the Hartford Courant, owned by the Tribune Corporation, and the Chicago Tribune, which printed it on a jump page.

It was at the Courant, on whose front page the image was published six columns wide, that inconsistencies in the image were noticed. The Courant's assistant managing editor Thom McGuire confirmed that the image was altered, and then contacted Colin Crawford, Los Angeles Times Director of Photography.

It took Crawford several days to get hold of Walski who was still in battle conditions covering the war. When confronted with the image Crawford said, "Give me an excuse. Tell me it was a satellite transmission problem. Say something." to which Walski replied, "No, I did it. I combined the two pictures."

As a result of manipulating the photograph, Walski was fired from the Los Angeles Times via satellite phone on April 1, 2003. The Los Angeles Times ran an immediate retraction, and on April 2 it ran a front-page article explaining Walski's faked image, illustrated by the two source images and the manipulated image. The Hartford Courant and the Chicago Tribune also ran retractions.

== Since the Iraq War ==
In 2005 Walski relocated to Colorado and founded Colorado Visions Photography, a commercial and wedding photography business.

== See also ==
- Ethical and legal considerations in photojournalism
- Photography
