= Bayeux Calvados-Normandy Award for war correspondents =

Journalism award

The Bayeux Calvados-Normandy Award for war correspondents (French: Prix Bayeux Calvados-Normandie des correspondants de guerre), previously the Bayeux-Calvados Awards for war correspondents, is an annual prize awarded since 1994, by the city of Bayeux and the Departmental Council of Calvados and now the Normandy Region in France. Its goal is to pay tribute to journalists who work in dangerous conditions to allow the public access to information about war.

== Details ==
The award was launched as part of the fiftieth anniversary of the Normandy landings. It is awarded in Bayeux, one of the first French cities to be liberated in the Second World War, .

The Bayeux Prize aims to raise public awareness of the profession of war reporter. It takes place during one week each year, in October, including several exhibitions, a book fair, a media forum, discussion evenings, movie screenings and youth-oriented events to participate in education to media. The event focusses on journalism and reporting about a conflict or post-conflict situation, or about an event related to the defense of freedoms and democracy.

The award has had twelve categories since 1994:

- Daily news
- Magazine
- Photojournalism
- Radio
- Television
- Large Format Television
- Web journalism
- Young reporter
- Lower Normandy Secondary School Students’ Prize
- Ouest-France – Jean Marin Prize (Print journalism)
- Public Prize
- Jury Prize

== Awards ==
The Bayeux-Calvados Awards for War Correspondents since 1994.

1994

- Daily news prize: Denis Arcand, La Presse
- Magazine prize: Philipp von Recklinghausen, Stern
- Photojournalism prize: André Soloviev, Associated Press
- Radio prize: Alan Little, BBC News
- Television prize: Élisabeth Burdot, RTBF
- Special prize of the jury: Paul Marchand, Radio Canada

1995

- Print journalism prize: Henri Guirchoun, Le Nouvel Observateur
- Photojournalism prize: Laurent Van der Stockt, Gamma
- Television prize: Ben Brown, BBC News
- The Ouest-France – Jean Marin Prize (print journalism): Xavier Gautier, Le Figaro
- Special prize of the jury: Patricia Coste, France 2

1996

- Print journalism prize: Patrick de Saint Exupéry, Le Figaro
- Photojournalism prize: James Nachtwey, Magnum for Time
- Radio prize: Nicolas Poincaré, France Inter
- Television prize: George Alagiah, BBC News
- The Lower Normandy Secondary School Students’: Eric Monier, France 2
- The Ouest-France – Jean Marin Prize (print journalism): Olivier Weber, Le Point

1997

- Print journalism prize: Alain Bommenel, AFP
- Photojournalism prize: Santiago Lyon, Associated Press
- Radio prize: François Clémenceau, Europe 1
- Television prize: Bob Coen and Amy Merz, CNN News
- The Lower Normandy Secondary School Students’: Roger Motte and Martine Laroche-Joubert, France 2
- The Ouest-France – Jean Marin Prize (print journalism): Jean-Paul Mari, Le Nouvel Observateur
- The Public Prize: Luc Delahaye, Magnum

1998

- Print journalism prize: Jean-Paul Mari, Le Nouvel Observateur
- Photojournalism prize: Achmad Ibrahim, Associated Press
- Radio prize: Nicolas Charbonneau, Europe 1
- Television prize: Morad Aïd-Habbouche and Christian Decarné, France 3
- The Lower Normandy Secondary School Students’: Morad Aïd-Habbouche and Christian Decarné, France 3
- The Ouest-France – Jean Marin Prize (print journalism): Jean Hatzfled, Libération
- The Public Prize: Hocine, AFP

1999

- Print journalism prize: Gabriel Grüner, Stern
- Photojournalism prize: James Nachtwey, Magnum for Time magazine
- Radio prize: Isabelle Dor, France Info
- Television prize: Fergal Keane, BBC News
- The Lower Normandy Secondary School Students’: Fergal Keane, BBC News
- The Ouest-France – Jean Marin Prize (print journalism): Javier Espinosa, El Mundo
- The Public Prize: Brennan Linsley, SIPA Press

2000

- Print journalism prize: Rémy Ourdan, Le Monde
- Photojournalism prize: Eric Bouvet, Freelance
- Radio prize: Madeleine Mukamabano and Médi Elhag, France Culture
- Television prize: Matt Frei and Darren Conway, BBC News
- The Lower Normandy Secondary School Students’: Rageh Omaar, BBC News
- The Ouest-France – Jean Marin Prize (print journalism): Patrick Saint-Paul, Le Figaro
- The Public Prize: Eric Bouvet, Freelance

2001

- Print journalism prize: Françoise Spiekermeier, Paris Match
- Photojournalism prize: Enric Marti, AP
- Radio prize: Gilles Perez, RFI
- Television prize: Ben Brown, BBC News
- The Lower Normandy Secondary School Students’: Marie-Claude Vogric, France 3
- The Ouest-France – Jean Marin Prize (print journalism): Maureen Cofflard, Le Nouvel Observateur
- The Public Prize: Jeffrey B. Russel, Corbis Sygma

2002

- Print journalism prize: Pierre Barbancey, L'Humanité
- Photojournalism prize: Luc Delahaye, Magnum Photos
- Radio prize: Arnaud Zajtman, BBC News
- Television prize: Gilles Jacquier, Bertrand Coq, Tatiana Derouet, Alexandre Berne, France 2
- The Lower Normandy Secondary School Students’: John Simpson, BBC News
- The Ouest-France – Jean Marin Prize (print journalism): Jean Kehayan Libération
- The Public Prize: Yannis Behrakis, Reuters

2003

- Print journalism prize: Sammy Ketz, AFP
- Photojournalism prize: Georges Gobet, AFP
- Radio prize: Renaud Bernard, France Info
- Television prize: Grégoire Deniau and Hervé Paploray, Capa Presse
- The Lower Normandy Secondary School Students’: Philippe Lamair, Luc Cauwenberghs, Stefan Janssens, Nathalie Lucien, RTBF
- The Ouest-France – Jean Marin Prize (print journalism): Caroline Laurent-Simon, Elle
- The Public Prize: Georges Gobet, AFP

2004

- Print journalism prize: James Meek and Suzanne Goldenberg, The Guardian (UK)
- Photojournalism prize: Karim Sahib, AFP
- Radio prize: Andrew Harding – BBC News
- Television prize: Paul Wood, Adam Moose Campbell, Yousseff Shomali, Sarah Halfpenny, Nigel Sawtell, Qais Hayawi, Laith Kawther – BBC News
- The Secondary School Students’: Fergal Keane, Glenn Middleton, Jackie Martens, Isaac Mugabi, BBC News
- The Ouest-France – Jean Marin Prize (print journalism): Christophe Ayad, Libération
- The Public Prize: Jaafar Ashtiyeh, AFP
- Jury's Prize: Caroline Laurent-Simon, Elle

2005

- Print journalism prize: Vincent Hugeux, L’Express
- Photojournalism: Jim MacMillan, AP
- Radio prize: Ishbel Matheson and Dan McMillan, BBC News
- Television prize: Julian Manyon, Sacha Lomakim, Artem Drabkin, Patrick O’Ryan-Roeder, ITN-ITV News
- The Lower Normandy Secondary School Students’: Caroline Sinz, Christian De Carné, Salah Agrabi, Michelle Guilloiseau-Joubair, France 3
- The Ouest-France – Jean Marin Prize (print journalism): Javier Espinosa, El Mundo
- The Public Prize: Roger Lemoyne, Maclean's Magazine/Redux Pictures/Alexia Foundation

2006

- Print journalism prize: Jon Stephenson, Metro
- Photojournalism prize: Jaafar Ashtiyeh, AFP
- Radio prize: Alex Last, BBC News
- Television prize: Neil Connery, ITN-ITV NEWS
- The Lower Normandy Secondary School Students': Jeff Koinange, CNN
- The Ouest-France – Jean Marin Prize (print journalism): Javier Espinosa, El Mundo
- The Public Prize: Tomas Van Houtryve, Freelance

2007

- Print journalism prize: Adrien Jaulmes, La Revue des Deux Mondes / Le Figaro
- Photojournalism prize: Mahmud Hams, AFP
- Radio news: Angus Crawford, BBC News
- Television prize: Alastair Leithead, BBC News
- Young reporter prize: Anne Guion, La Vie
- The Lower Normandy Secondary School Students’: Orla Guerin, BBC News
- The Ouest-France – Jean Marin Prize (print journalism): Benjamin Barthe, Le Monde
- The Public Prize: Mahmud Hams, AFP

2008

- Print journalism prize: Elizabeth Rubin, New York Times Magazine
- Photojournalism prize: Balazs Gardi, VII Network
- Radio prize: Mike Thomson, BBC News
- Television prize: Dominique Derda – France 2
- Young reporter prize: Julius Mwelu, IRIN
- Lower Normandy Secondary School Students’: Dominique Derda, France 2
- The Ouest-France – Jean Marin Prize (print journalism): Anne Guion, La Vie
- Public Prize: Yasuyoshi Chiba, AFP

2009

- Print journalism prize: Christina Lamb, The Sunday Times
- Photojournalism prize: Walter Astrada, AFP
- Radio prize: Tim Franks, BBC News
- Television prize: Paul Comiti, TF1
- Large Format Television: Jeremy Bowen, BBC News
- Young reporter: Mohamed Dahir, AFP
- Lower Normandy Secondary School Students’ Prize: Paul Comiti, TF1
- The Ouest-France – Jean Marin Prize (print journalism): Célia Mercier – XXI
- Public Prize: Jérôme Delay, AP

2010

- Print journalism prize: Christophe Boltanski, Le Nouvel Observateur
- Photojournalism prize: Véronique de Viguerie, Paris Match / Getty Images
- Radio prize: Florence Lozach, Europe 1
- Television prize: Danfung Dennis, PBS
- Large Format Television: Gilles Jacquier, France 2
- Young reporter prize: Miles Amoore, The Sunday Times
- Lower Normandy Secondary School Students’ Prize: Danfung Dennis, PBS
- The Ouest-France – Jean Marin Prize (print journalism): Mélanis Bois – Elle
- Public Prize: Véronique de Viguerie – Paris Match / Getty Imagest

2011

- Print journalism prize: Jon Stephenson, Metro Magazine
- Photojournalism prize: Yuri Kozyrev, Noor
- Radio prize: Etienne Monin – France Info
- Television prize: Alex Crawford, Sky News
- Large Format Television: Vaughan Smith, Frontline Club
- Web journalism: Zoé Lamazou and Sarah Leduc, France 24
- Young reporter: Sara Hussein – AFP
- Lower Normandy Secondary School Students’ Prize: Alex Crawford, Sky News
- The Ouest-France – Jean Marin Prize (print journalism): Mariana Grépinet, Paris Match
- Public Prize: Yuri Kozyrev, Noor

2012

- Print journalism prize: Javier Espinosa, El Mundo
- Photojournalism prize: Aris Messinis, AFP
- Radio Prize: Jeremy Bowen, BBC News
- Television prize: Nic Robertson, CNN
- Large Format Television: Mathieu Mabin, France 24
- Web journalism prize: David Wood, Huffington Post
- Young reporter prize: Ed Ou, Getty Images
- Lower Normandy Secondary School Students’ Prize: Mathieu Mabin, France 24
- The Ouest-France – Jean Marin Prize (print journalism): Rémy Ourdan, Le Monde
- Public Prize: Manu Brabo, AP

2013

- Print journalism prize: Jean-Philippe Remy (Le Monde)
- Photojournalism prize: Fabio Bucciarelli (AFP)
- Television prize: Sophie Nivelle-Cardinale (TF1)
- Radio prize: Marine Olivesi (CBC)
- Large Format Television: Ben Anderson (BBC News)
- Young reporter prize: Florentin Cassonnet (XXI)
- Web journalism prize: Laurent Van der Stockt and Jean-Philippe Remy (Le Monde)
- Secondary school students’ prize: Sophie Nivelle-Cardinale (TF1)
- The Ouest-France – Jean Marin prize: Wolfgang Bauer (Die Zeit)
- Public prize: Javier Manzano (AFP)

2014

- Photojournalism prize: Mohammed al-Shaikh (AFP)
- Print journalism prize: Anthony Loyd (Times)
- Television prize: Lyse Doucet (BBC News)
- Large Format Television: Marcel Mettelsiefen (Arte Reportage)
- Radio prize: Olivier Poujade (France Inter)
- The Ouest-France – Jean Marin prize: Claire Meynial
- Young reporter prize: Alexey Furman
- Secondary school students’ prize: Mathieu Mabin (France 24)
- Web journalism prize: Gerald Holubowicz, Olga Kravets, Maria Morina, Oksana Yushko and Anna Shpakova
- Public prize (photojournalism): Emin Ozmen (Sipa Press)

2015

- Photojournalism prize: Heidi Levine (Sipa Press)
- Print journalism prize: Christopher Reuter (Der Spiegel)
- Television prize: Mikhail Galutsov (Vice)
- Large Format Television: Xavier Muntz (Arte)
- Radio prize: Emma-Jane Kirby (BBC)
- The Ouest-France – Jean Marin prize: Wolfgang Bauer (Die Zeit)
- Young reporter prize: Pierre Sautreuil (L'Obs)
- Secondary school students’ prize: Alex Crawford (Sky News)
- Web journalism prize: Christian Werner (Süddeutsche Zeitung)
- Public prize (photojournalism): Heidi Levine (Sipa Press)

2016

- Photojournalism prize: Yannis Behrakis (Reuters)
- Print journalism prize: Wolfgang Bauer (Die Zeit)
- Television prize, Amnesty International prize: Arnaud Comte and Stéphane Guillemot (France 2)
- Large Format Television: Ayman Oghanna and Warzer Jaff (Vice News)
- Radio prize: Jeremy Bowen (BBC News)
- The Ouest-France – Jean Marin prize: Célia Mercier (Revue XXI)
- Young reporter prize: Mohammed Badra (European Pressphoto Agency)
- Normandy Secondary school students’ prize: Virginie Nguyen Hoang and Dastane Altaïr (France 4)
- Web journalism prize: Guillaume Herbaut and Paul Ouazan (Arte)
- Public prize (photojournalism): Yannis Behrakis (Reuters)

2017

- Print journalism prize: Samuel Forey (Le Figaro)
- Photojournalism prize: Ali Arkadi (VII Photo Agency)
- Television prize: Waad Al-Kateab (Channel 4)
- Radio prize: Gwendoline Debono (Europe 1)
- Large Format Television: Olivier Sarbil (Channel 4 News)
- Young reporter prize: May Jeong (The Intercept)
- Normandy Secondary school students’ prize: Waad Al-Kateab (Channel 4)
- The Ouest-France – Jean Marin prize: Fritz Schaap (Der Spiegel)
- Public prize: Antoine Agoudjian (Le Figaro Magazine)

2018

- Print journalism prize: Kenneth R. Rosen (The Atavist magazine)
- Photojournalism prize: Mahmud Hams (AFP)
- Television prize: Nima Elbagir, Alex Platt and Raja Razek (CNN)
- Radio prize: Gwendoline Debono (Europe 1)
- Large Format Television: Nicolas Bertrand and Thomas Donzel (France 2)
- Young reporter prize: Mushfiqul Alam (freelance)
- Normandy Secondary school students’ prize: Stéphanie Perez, Nicolas Auer and Laetitia Niro (France 2)
- The Ouest-France – Jean Marin prize: Jean-Philippe Rémy (Le Monde)
- Public prize: Paula Bronstein (Getty images reportage)

2019

- Print journalism prize: Fritz Schaap (Der Spiegel)
- Photojournalism prize: Patrick Chauvel (Freelance for Paris Match)
- Television prize: Orla Guerin, Lee Durant and Nicola Careem (BBC)
- Radio prize: Sami Boukhelifa (Radio France Internationale)
- Large Format Television: Clément Gargoullaud and Shafat Farooq (Babel Press for Arte)
- Young reporter prize: Wilson Fache (L'orient-Le Jour / The National Newspaper / Vice)
- Normandy Secondary school students’ prize: Leo Ramirez, Jesus Olarte, Yorman Maldonado, Carlos Reyes, Natasha Vazquez and Edinson Estupinan (AFP TV)
- The Ouest-France – Jean Marin prize: Fritz Schaap (Der Spiegel)
- Public prize: Patrick Chauvel (Freelance)

2020

- Print journalism prize: Allan Kaval (Le Monde)
- Photojournalism prize: Lorenzo Tugnoli (The Washington Post)
- Television prize: John Sudworth and Wang Xiping (BBC)
- Radio prize: Sonia Ghezali and Shahzaib Wahlah (Radio France Internationale)
- Large Format Television: Suzanne Allant, Yamaan Khatib and Fadi Al-Halabi (Arte)
- Young reporter prize: Anas Alkharboutli (Deutsche Presse-Agentur)
- Normandy Secondary school students’ prize: John Sudworth and Wang Xiping (BBC)
- The Ouest-France – Jean Marin prize: Allan Kaval (Le Monde)
- Public prize: Anthony Wallace (AFP)
- Video Image Prize: Olivier Jobard (Arte / France24)

2021

- Photojournalism Prize : Anonymous Journalist from Myanmar (New York Times)
- Print Journalism Prize : Wolfgang Bauer (Zeit Magazin)
- Television Prize : Orla Guerin and Goktay Koraltan (BBC)
- Radio : Margaux Benn (Europe 1)
- Large Format Television : Damir Sagolj and Danis Tanović (Al Jazeera)
- Young Reporter Prize : Thomas D’Istria, Anonymous Journalism student from Minsk (Le Monde)
- The Ouest-France – Jean Marin prize: Wolfgang Bauer (Zeit Magazin)
- Public Prize: Abu Mustafa Ibraheem (Reuters)
- Video Image Prize: Damir Sagolj and Danis Tanović (Al Jazeera)
- Normandy Secondary school students’ prize: Orla Guerin and Goktay Koraltan (BBC).

2022

- Photojournalism Prize : Evgeniy Maloletka (Associated Press)
- Public Prize: Vadim Ghirda, Associated Press
- Young Reporter Prize : Abdulmonam Eassa, freelance for (Le Monde, The New York Times, Getty Images)
- Print: Mariam Ouédraogo (Éditions Sidwaya)
- The Ouest-France – Jean Marin prize: Nicolas Delesalle (Paris Match)
- Radio: Maurine Mercier (France Info) (Radio Télévision Suisse)
- Television: Théo Maneval and Pierre Dehoorne (France 5, C dans l’air)
- Large Format Television Prize: Philip Cox (The Guardian)
- Normandy Secondary school students’ prize: Dorothée Ollieric, Nicolas Auer and Mortaza Behboudi (France 2)
- Video Image Prize: Mstyslav Tchernov (Associated Press).

2023

- Photojournalism prize: Siegfried Modola (freelance)
- Print journalism prize: Anthony Loyd (The Times)
- Television prize: Nick Paton Walsh, Brice Lainé, Natalie Gallon and Étienne Dupont (CNN)
- Large Format Television: Edward Kaprov, Daniel Fainberg and Eugene Titov (Magnéto Presse for Arte)
- Radio prize: Maurine Mercier (Radio Télévision Suisse-France Info)
- The Ouest-France – Jean Marin prize: Louis Imbert (Le Monde)
- Young reporter prize: Francis Farrell (The Kyiv Independent)
- Normandy Secondary school students’ prize: Nick Paton Walsh, Brice Lainé, Natalie Gallon and Étienne Dupont (CNN)
- Video Image Prize: Quentin Sommerville and Darren Conway (BBC News)
- Public prize (photojournalism): Paula Bronstein (Getty Images)
