= 24h.com =

24h (24h.com) is a photography program established by the French photography magazine Photographie.com and kicked off in October 2010 commissioning photographers to document specific events around the globe. During each event, selected photographers are given 24 hours to express their talent and explore and photograph whatever interests them. Selected shots are disseminated live on the 24h.com website. This experiment in "neo-media" enables a photographer's work to be posted very quickly.

Events covered by 24h.com include:

- 2 October 2010: Nuit blanche in Paris
- 9 October 2010: Hanoi Millennium
- 23 April 2011: Beijing (on the occasion of the opening of the Caochangdi Photo Spring festival)
- 11 September 2011: 10 Year Commemoration 9-11
- 12/13 November 2011: Le Paris de la Photo

According to founder Didier de Faÿs, "24h is the press experience which upsets the usual codes of journalism and tries to show people a new approach of photography. 24h usually works with local photographers and brings an authentic vision of the culture and the populations".

Photographers participating in 24h-projects include Claudius Schulze, Jane Evelyn Atwood, Jean-Christian Bourcart, Patrick Chauvel, Olivier Laban-Mattei, Reza Deghati or Manuel Rivera-Ortiz.
