= Greenpeace (disambiguation) =

Greenpeace or Greenpeace International is a non-governmental environmental organization founded in Vancouver in 1971.

Greenpeace may also refer to:

- Greenpeace USA, an affiliate of Greenpeace International
- Greenpeace Foundation, a USA based environmental organization founded in Honolulu in 1976, not affiliated to Greenpeace International
- London Greenpeace, an anarchist environmentalist activist collective that existed between 1971 and 2001, not affiliated to Greenpeace International
- Greenpeace India, Indian affiliate of Greenpeace International
- MV Greenpeace, another ship used by Greenpeace International
- Greenpeace Energy, German energy company affiliated to Greenpeace International
- Greenpeace Magazin, environmental magazine in Germany
- Greenpeace (music group), 2005 New Zealand charity supergroup affiliated to Greenpeace International
- Phyllis Cormack, the first ship used under the name Greenpeace by the organisation that later became Greenpeace International
- The Green Peace Laboratory was the metallurgist Henry Marion Howe's laboratory in retirement (1913-1922)
