= Recherche =

Recherche or La Recherche may refer to:

== Publications ==
- Recherche (newspaper), a former French-language newspaper in Chania, Greece
- La Recherche (magazine), a monthly French language popular science magazine
- La Recherche, short for À la recherche du temps perdu, French novel cycle by Marcel Proust

== Places ==
- Recherche, Tasmania, Australia, rural locality in Huon Valley local government area
- Recherche Archipelago, Western Australia
- Recherche Bay, Tasmania, Australia
- Recherche Fjord, Bellsund, Spitsbergen

== Other ==
- French ship Recherche (1787) (or La Recherche), of the 1791–1793 Bruni d'Entrecasteaux expedition to Australia
- La Recherche or Recherche, of the 1838–1840 La Recherche Expedition to the Faroe Islands, Spitsbergen and Iceland
- Ensemble Recherche, German contemporary classical music ensemble

== See also ==
- Research (disambiguation), English-language equivalent
