= Manuel Rivera-Ortiz =

Puerto Rican photographer

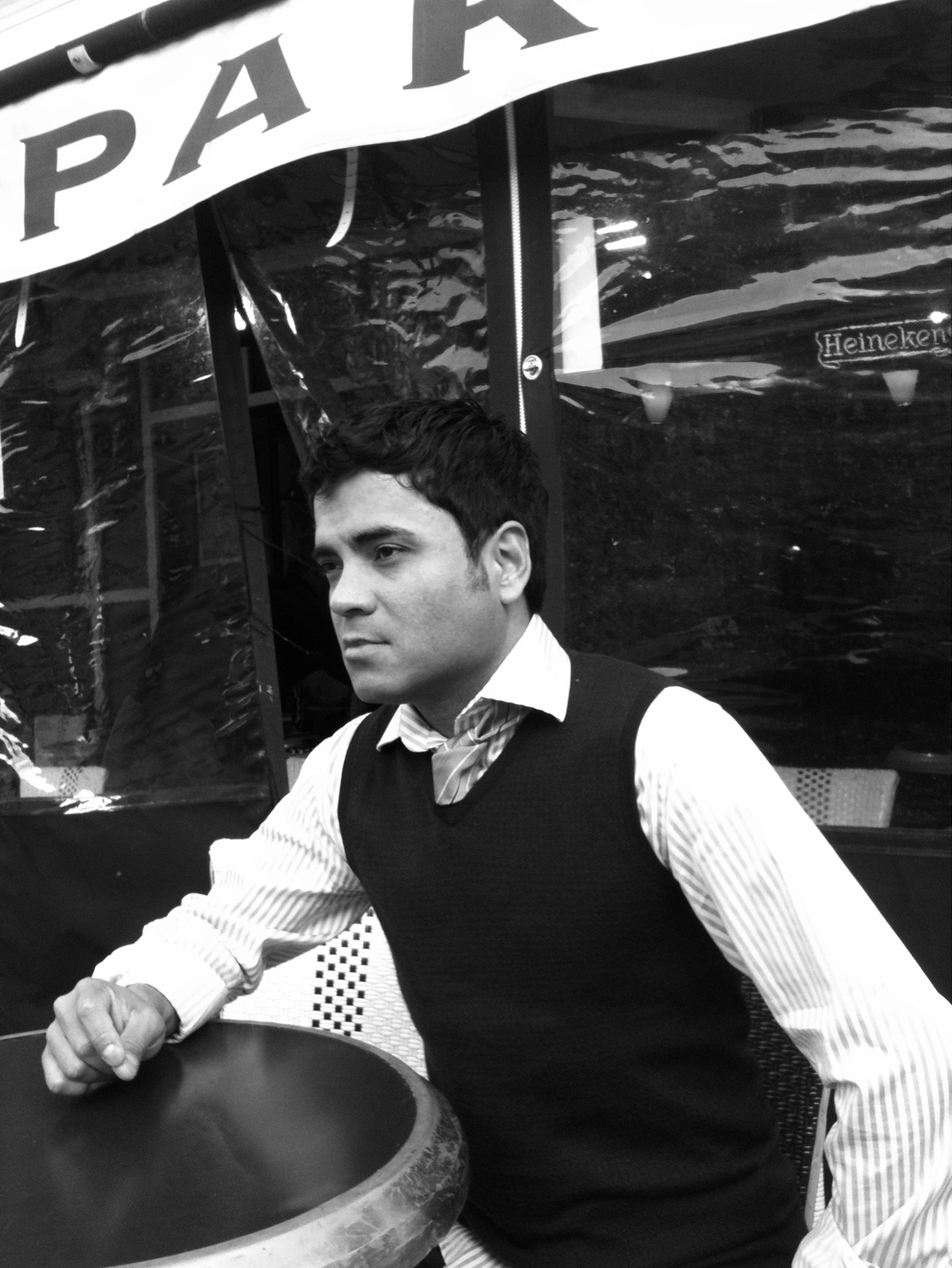
- Manuel Rivera-Ortiz, Paris, France, 2009
- Born: December 23, 1968 (age 57); Guayama, Puerto Rico
- Notable credit(s): 2004: En Foco New Works Photography Award. 2007: Artist of the Year, Arts & Cultural Council for Greater Rochester
- Website: www.rivera-ortiz.com

Manuel Rivera-Ortiz (born December 23, 1968) is a stateside Puerto Rican photographer. He is best known for his social documentary photography of people's living conditions in less developed nations. Rivera-Ortiz lives in Rochester, New York, and in Zurich.

== Life and work ==
Rivera-Ortiz was born into a poor family in the barrio of Pozo Hondo, outside Guayama on the Caribbean coast of Puerto Rico, the eldest of ten children (including four half-siblings and two stepsisters). He grew up in a corrugated tin shack with dirt floors devoid of running water. His father hand-chopped sugar cane in the fields of Central Machete and Central Aguirre in the declining days of the Puerto Rican sugar industry, and, following the Zafra or sugar-harvesting season, labored as a migrant farmworker in New England and the Mid-Atlantic states.

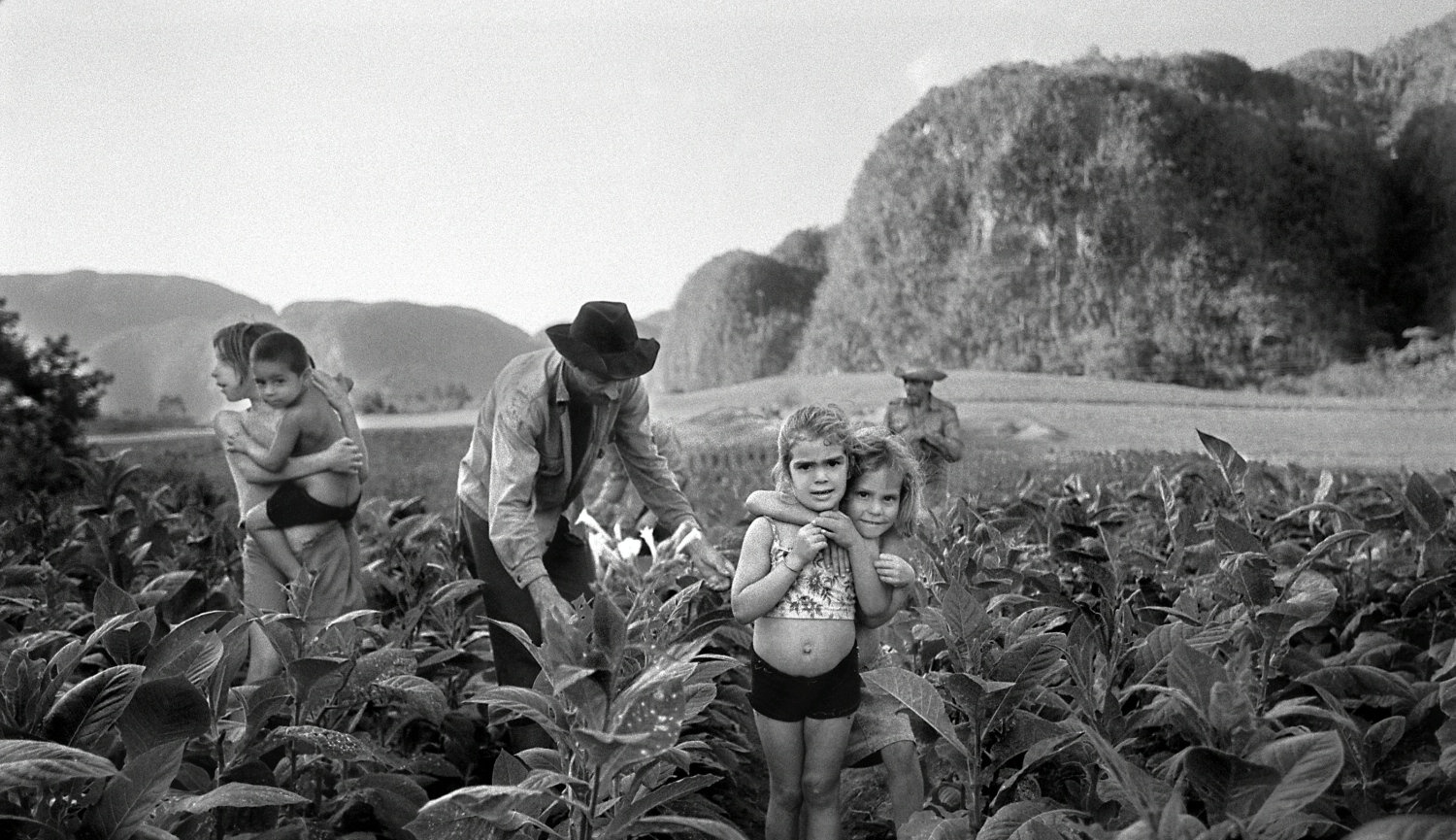
Tobacco Harvesting, Viñales Valley, Cuba 2002

When Rivera-Ortiz was 11 years old, his parents separated and his father moved with the children to the USA mainland in Holyoke, Massachusetts. The separation from his mother, whom he has not seen since, had a profound effect on Rivera-Ortiz. He attended classes at Mt. Holyoke and Springfield colleges as part of the Massachusetts Migrant Education summer program, where he was offered his first courses in photography and film development. The family later moved to Rochester, New York.

After attending East High School (Rochester, New York) Rivera-Ortiz worked as a journalist. In 1995, he graduated cum laude with a B.A. degree as an English major from Nazareth College, and in 1998, he received his Master's degree from the Columbia University Graduate School of Journalism. Rivera-Ortiz was the 2024 Commencement speaker of Nazareth University and also received an honorary doctorate from the university for his achievements. His alma mater Nazareth College became a university in 2023 after 99 years of existence.

Following his graduation, he worked as a journalist for newspapers (e.g. Democrat and Chronicle) and magazines (e.g. Elle), but soon turned to photojournalism and documentary photography. In 2001, he began traveling as a freelance photographer with an emphasis on social issues and has exhibited his work in photographic exhibitions.

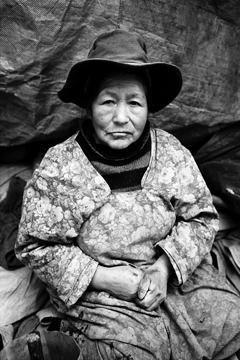
Widow Of The Mines, Potosí, Bolivia 2004

Traveling widely, his photography focuses on humanitarian issues often ignored by mainstream media. His work is included in museum and corporate collections, including George Eastman House International Museum of Photography and Film, the Nelson-Atkins Museum of Art and the Museum of Fine Arts Berne. In 2004, he received En Foco's New Works Photography Award, and in 2007 the Artist of the Year Award of the Arts & Cultural Council for Greater Rochester.

In 2002, he photographed Cuba, comparing what he found there to the Puerto Rico of his youth. He has exhibited photographs showing the dignity of the Dalit ("Untouchable") Caste of India and the Aymara living in the arid altiplano of Bolivia. He has also photographed people from Kenya to Turkey to Thailand. His work has been featured in the April 2008 issue of Rangefinder magazine. In 2010, Rivera-Ortiz visited Dharavi and Baiganwadi and took pictures of daily life in these two Mumbai slums. In 2011, he documented the September 11 Commemorations in Shanksville, Pennsylvania for the French photography organization 24h.com. In 2012, the Columbia University Graduate School of Journalism featured Rivera-Ortiz' work on poverty in the developing world in its collection of 50 Great Stories produced by alumni over the past century.

The work of Manuel Rivera-Ortiz demonstrates that social documentary as activism still continues to exist in the modern world.

Rivera-Ortiz can be classified as a social realist with his focus on social issues and the hardships of everyday life.

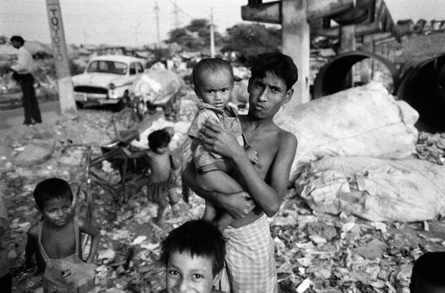
City Dump, Yamuna River Slum, Delhi, India 2005

== Publications ==
=== Publications by Rivera-Ortiz ===
- India - A Celebration of Life, Heidelberg, Germany: Kehrer, 2015. ISBN 978-3-86828-609-0.
- Cuba, Heidelberg, Germany: Kehrer, 2021. ISBN 978-3-96900-030-4.

=== Publications with others ===
- Viajeros: North American Artist / Photographers’ Images of Cuba. Bethlehem, PA: Lehigh University Art Galleries, 2005. Catalog of an exhibition held at the Dubois Gallery, Lehigh University, Bethlehem, PA, 2 November 2005 - 8 January 2006. "This exhibition consists of 59 artists featured in a multimedia project of over 100 images. It presents photographic essays, videos and single/dual images of Cuba..."
- Voices in First Person. New York: Simon & Schuster, 2008. Edited by Lori Marie Carlson. ISBN 1-4169-8445-3. Rivera-Ortiz provides the photographs in what the publisher describes as "A collection of monologues featuring the most respected Latino authors writing today, including Sandra Cisneros, Oscar Hijuelos, and Gary Soto."
- Percepciones en Blanco & Negro – Colombia. Ediciones Adéer Lyinad, 2009.
- 100 Photographs: The Most Influential Images of All Time. New York: Time, 2016

=== Publications edited by Rivera-Ortiz ===
- A New Documentary. The Manuel Rivera-Ortiz Foundation for Documentary Photography & Film, 2013. ISBN 978-0-9896053-0-4.

== Exhibitions ==
=== Selected solo exhibitions ===
- 2004 Weitman Gallery, Washington University in St. Louis, MO
- 2004 Link Gallery, City Hall, Rochester, NY
- 2006 Seventh & Second Photo Gallery, New York, NY
- 2006/2007 Link Gallery, City Hall, Rochester, NY
- 2007 El Museo Francisco Oller y Diego Rivera, Buffalo, NY
- 2007 Columbia University Joseph Pulitzer Graduate School of Journalism, New York, NY
- 2007 William Whipple Art Gallery, Southwest Minnesota State University, Marshall, MN
- 2007 Memorial Art Gallery, Rochester, NY
- 2008 Nuyorican Poets Café, New York, NY
- 2008 Swiss Re, Zurich, Switzerland

=== Selected group exhibitions ===
- 2003 Credit Suisse, New York, NY
- 2004 Memorial Art Gallery, Rochester, NY
- 2005 Longwood Art Gallery, New York, NY
- 2005 Chelsea Art Museum, New York, NY
- 2005 Lehigh University Art Galleries, Bethlehem, PA
- 2006 George Eastman House, Rochester, NY
- 2007 The Centre Gallery, Miami Dade College, Wolfson Campus, Miami, FL
- 2007 Art Off The Main, Art Expo, Puck Building, New York, NY
- 2013 Istanbul Modern, Istanbul, Turkey
- 2013 Rencontres d'Arles, Arles, France
- 2013 Ikono Gallery, Brussels, Belgium
- 2015 Paris Photo, Paris
- 2019 Rencontres d'Arles, Arles, France

== The Manuel Rivera-Ortiz Foundation for Documentary Photography & Film ==
The Manuel Rivera-Ortiz Foundation for Documentary Photography & Film is a non-profit private operating foundation headquartered in Rochester, New York. Rivera-Ortiz established the Foundation in 2010 to support underrepresented photographers and filmmakers from less developed countries with awards, grants, exhibitions, and educational programs. The foundation operates an exhibition space in Arles, France.

== Collections ==
- Columbia University Graduate School of Journalism, NY.
- George Eastman House, Rochester, NY.
- Lehigh University Art Galleries, Bethlehem, PA.
- William Whipple Art Gallery and Museum, Marshall, MN.
- Nelson-Atkins Museum of Art, Kansas City, MO.
- The Library of Congress, Washington, D.C.
