= Rémy Ourdan =

French journalist

Rémy Ourdan is a French journalist, war correspondent for the newspaper Le Monde, and documentary filmmaker.

== Biography ==
=== Journalism ===
Rémy Ourdan began as a reporter in 1992 in besieged Sarajevo. He covers for more than three decades for Le Monde the main conflicts in the world, as well as post-war, human rights and international justice issues. He also continues his long-term work on Sarajevo.

=== Various Publications ===
- "Après-guerre(s)" (foreword & "Sarajevo, après le siège"), edited by Rémy Ourdan, Autrement, Paris, 2001
- "A War, and Ricochets" (VII, "WAR", de.MO, New York, 2003)
- "America vs Al Qaeda : A Foe's Best Friend" (Dispatches, "Beyond Iraq", 2008)
- "Le Monde, les grands reportages 1944-2009" (Les Arènes, Paris, 2009)
- "Sarajevo, a love story" (foreword & "Soldier's Words", "Bosnia 1992-1995", edited by Jon Jones, Sarajevo, 2012)
- "Le Monde, les grands reportages 1944-2012" (Pocket, Paris, 2012)
- "Première nuit à Sarajevo" ("Robert Capa - 100 photos pour la liberté de la presse", Reporters Sans Frontières, Paris, 2015)
- "Marcher dans les ruines" (Zérane S. Girardeau, "Déflagrations. Dessins d’enfants, guerres d’adultes", Anamosa, Paris, 2017)
- "Partez ou vous allez tous mourir" (introduction, Bruno Philip, "Aung San Suu Khi, l’icône fracassée", Les Equateurs, Paris, 2017)
- "643 enfants" (Zérane S. Girardeau, "Dessins d’enfants et violences de masse", Lienart, Paris, 2021)
- "Patrick Chauvel, tant qu'il y aura des guerres" ("Patrick Chauvel - 100 photos pour la liberté de la presse", Reporters Sans Frontières, Paris, 2022)

=== Film ===
Rémy Ourdan is the author and director of the documentary film The Siege (co-directed with Patrick Chauvel, Agat Films & Cie, 2016).

=== Exhibitions ===
- "The world of 9/11" (co-curated with Stéphane Grimaldi, Mémorial de Caen, Caen, 2021)
- "Traces of Humanity" (co-curated with Damir Šagolj, Hôtel du Doyen, Bayeux-Calvados Awards for war correspondents, Bayeux, 2021)
- "Tragovi humanosti" (co-curated with Damir Šagolj, Bosnian Cultural Center, Sarajevo, 2022)

=== Other ===
Rémy Ourdan organized on April 6, 2012, for the 20th anniversary of the war in Bosnia, a reunion called "Sarajevo 2012", for which hundreds of war reporters came back to Sarajevo. He published, with Jon Jones and Gary Knight, the photo book Bosnia 1992-1995 (edited by Jon Jones, 2012), for which he wrote the foreword Sarajevo, a love story.

Rémy Ourdan is a co-founder and was the first director of the WARM Foundation on contemporary conflicts (2012-2019), based in Sarajevo.

=== Awards ===
- Bayeux-Calvados Awards for war correspondents 2000 for a story on the war in Sierra Leone (Le Monde, 1999).
- Bayeux-Calvados Awards for war correspondents 2012, Ouest-France/Jean-Marin Prize for a story on the Mexican drug war in Ciudad Juarez (Le Monde, 2012).
- Gold FIPA for Best Documentary 2016 for The Siege (Agat Films & Cie, 2016).
