= Yannis Behrakis =

Greek photojournalist (1960–2019)

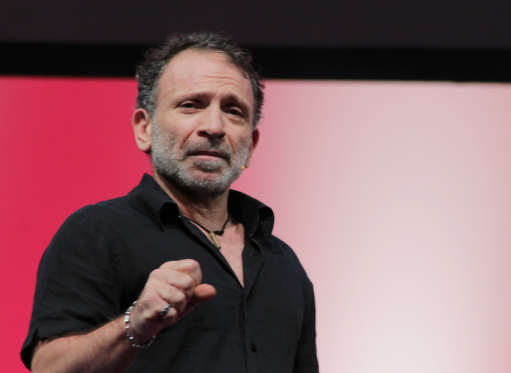
- Born: 29 August 1960; Athens, Greece
- Died: 2 March 2019 (aged 58); Athens, Greece
- Occupation: Photojournalist
- Known for: 2016 Pulitzer Prize for Breaking News Photography; 2015 Photojournalist of the year by Reuters

Yannis Behrakis (Greek: Γιάννης Μπεχράκης; 29 August 1960 – 2 March 2019) was a Greek photojournalist and a Senior editor with Reuters.

== Biography ==
Yannis Behrakis was born in 1960 in Athens. He studied photography in the Athens School of Arts and Technology and received his BA (Honours) from Middlesex University. He worked as a studio photographer in Athens in 1985–86. In 1987 he started a working relation as a contractor for Reuters and in late 1988 he was offered a staff job with the agency based in Athens. His first foreign assignment was in Libya in January 1989. Since then he documented a variety of events including the funeral of Ayatollah Khomeini in Iran, the changes in Eastern Europe and the Balkans, the wars in Croatia, Bosnia and Kosovo, Chechnya, Sierra Leone, Somalia, Afghanistan, Lebanon, the first and second Gulf wars in Iraq, the Arab Spring in Egypt, Libya and Tunisia, the war in Donbas, the NATO bombing of ISIS in Kobane, Syria, the Greek government-debt crisis and the European migrant crisis in 2015.

He also covered the Israeli–Palestinian conflict for many years, earthquakes in Kashmir, Turkey, Greece and Iran and major news events around the world. He also covered four Summer Olympics, the 1994 World Cup in the US and many international sports events. He moved with Reuters to Jerusalem as the chief photographer for Israel and the Palestinian Territories in 2008/9. In 2010 he moved back in Greece to cover the Greek government-debt crisis.

He took part in group and solo exhibitions in Athens, Thessaloniki, London, Edinburgh, New York City, Rome, Barcelona, Madrid, Portugal, France and Dubai.

In 2000, Behrakis survived an ambush in Sierra Leone where the American reporter Kurt Schork and Spanish cameraman Miguel Gil Moreno de Mora of Associated Press Television were killed. He and South African cameraman Mark Chisholm managed to get away from the attackers. In 2016, he led a Thomson Reuters team to win the 2016 Pulitzer Prize for Breaking News Photography.

Behrakis died after a long battle with cancer in Athens on 2 March 2019, aged 58. Behrakis is survived by his daughter Rebecca, son Dimitri and his wife, Elisavet.

== Awards ==
- As a member of the Photography Staff of Reuters, Pulitzer Prize, Breaking News Photography, 2016.
- European News Photographer of the Year, European Fuji Awards (in 1998, 2002 and 2003)
- Greek News Photographer of the year, seven times by the Greek Fuji Awards
- Overseas Press Club of America photography award (1999)
- 1st prize in the General News Stories category, by the World Press Photo Foundation for his work on Kosovo (2000)
- Botsis Foundation Award (2000)
- Three times the Bayeux-Calvados Awards for war correspondents.
- 2004, 2009, 2013, 2014, 2015, and 2016 awards in the China International Press Photo Contest
- 2012 award of excellence in Best of Photojournalism (BOP) in General news stories
- 2013 and 2015 awards in General news category of Pictures of the Year international (POYi) by the Missouri School of Journalism
- 2015 – Photographer of the year by The Guardian newspaper
- 2015 – Photojournalist of the year by Reuters
- 2016 – Days Japan International Photojournalism Awards, first prize
