= Amon Ashaba Mwiine =

Ugandan gender activist and lecturer

- Born: 1 November 1981 (age 45)
- Education: Makerere University; Stellenbosch University
- Occupation: Researcher/Lecturer

Amon Ashaba Mwiine is a Ugandan gender activist and lecturer at the School of Women and Gender Studies, Makerere University. He went to Stellenbosch University, South Africa where he attained his PhD (Sociology). He is a trainer with Gender Responsive Researchers Equipped for Agricultural Transformation (GREAT) on aspects of Masculinities and Agriculture and Gender Transformative Approaches.

He is a visiting research fellow at the Institute of Development Studies (IDS), University of Sussex (2022). He holds a 3-year CHUSS/ MELLON fellowship in the College of Humanities and Social Sciences, Makerere University on archiving memory and method in the College of Humanities and Social Sciences, Makerere University (2022–2024). His research project is entitled Men, Marriage and Memory. and in (2019–2021) Mellon fellowship was supported by Andrew W. Mellon Foundation.

He is currently a certified gender auditor by the United Nations in assessing the mainstreaming of gender in institutional processes, practices, and policy interventions. His recent publication include Mwiine, A. A. et al. (2023) Unravelling Backlash in the Journey of Legislating Sexual Offences in Uganda.

== Background and education ==
Amon Ashaba Mwiine born in 1981, undertook and finished his bachelor's degree at Makerere University, BA (Social sciences) with First Class honors degree, Majoring in Gender studies and minoring in Social Administration from 2001 to 2004.

Attained a Certificate in post-graduate research and writing skills training at Center for Basic research, Kampala in 2006. He also undertook United Nations Development Programme Training in Participatory Gender Auditing Master of Art in Gender studies. (Research Area: Gender Identity Construction and Reconstruction in Student Hostels around Makerere University) 2010 to 2011.

Holds a PhD (Sociology) from Stellenbosch University, South Africa. His PhD project explored the phenomenon of ‘male champions’ – men who speak to issues of gender apparently on behalf of women – in legislative processes. He is currently a lecturer at the School of Women and Gender Studies, Makerere University.

Makerere University, UGA	BA (Hons), 2004	Social Sciences
Center for Basic research (CBR)	Cert, 2006	Post-graduate research and writing skills
University of Oldenburg, Germany	2010	Implementing Migration studies (IMMIS)

== Career ==
=== Academic career ===
In February 2012, he co-facilitated a Participatory Gender Audit of the Ministry of Finance Planning and Economic Development, Government of Uganda. From March to April 2012, he co-facilitated a Participatory Gender Audit of the Ministry of Local Government, Government of Uganda. In April 2012, he facilitated a Participatory Gender Audit of the Forum for African Women Educationalists – Uganda Chapter (FAWEU). In June 2012 he participated in the formulation of Gender Equity Budgeting Curriculum with Ministry of Finance, Planning and Economic Development. In August 2012, appointed Assistant Lecturer, School of Women and Gender Studies, Makerere University. In September 2012, he was the facilitator of the Participatory Gender Audit in the United Nations Development Programme (UNDP – Uganda).

From January to February 2013, he worked as a facilitator at the Participatory Gender Audit in Ministry of Education and Sports, Uganda.

=== Research projects ===
October – December 2013 On the team Developing gender and Development Curriculum with Ministry of Gender, labor and Social development· September 2013 – 2014; Comparative research project on gender for The Effective States and Inclusive Development (ESID); an international research partnership funded by the UK government's Department for International Development and hosted by the University of Manchester in the UK and Center for Basic Research – Uganda · June 2013 – December 2013, Researcher on Isis – WICCE project on Making a Difference:Towards Women ’ s Substantive Engagement in Parliament and Local Council Decision Making in Uganda· Nov 2012 – June 2013, National Study to inform the Review of the National Strategy for Girls’ Education in Uganda · May 2012 – May 2013; Researcher on Uganda at 50 years of Independence; Amplifying citizens ’ voices, CBR · Celebrating active Citizenship. 2012, Gender and Climate change adaptation, Mbale and Sembabule Districts · 2010 – 2012 The Experience of Poverty and Shame in Diverse Cultural Settings, a multi-cultural study coordinated by Oxford University· 2011, participated in the country wide research on advocating for an Educational Policy onSchool Pregnancy and Drop out in Uganda· 2011; Gender and Climate Change: Assessing Impacts and Strategies for Mitigation and Adaptation to Climate change in Uganda · December 2010 to date; working with Gender Mainstreaming Directorate on situational Analysis of the Gender terrain in Public Universities of Kyambogo, Mbarara, Busitema and Gulu.

== Publications ==
=== Books chapters ===
Ahikire, J., & Mwiine, A. (2019). Contesting ideas, aligning incentives: The politics of Uganda’s Domestic Violence Act (2010). In S. Nazneen, S. Hickey, & S. Eleni (Eds.), Negotiating Gender Equity in the Global South: The Politics of Domestic Violence Policy (pp. 67–87) that was published by the London & New York City: Routledge.

Mwiine, A., & Bantebya-Kyobuhendo. (2015). Poverty the invisible and inseparable "shadow": Reflections from the media and the better off in rural Uganda. In E. Chase & Bantebya-Kyomuhendo (Eds.), Poverty and Shame: Global Experiences (pp. 205–217). Oxford: Oxford University Press.
