= Igor Samolet =

Russian contemporary artist

- Born: 28 July 1984 (age 41); Kotlas, Russian SFSR, Soviet Union

Igor Samolet (Russian: Игорь Самолёт; born 28 July 1984) is a Russian artist and photographer.

== Life and work ==
Igor Samolet graduated from Syktyvkar State University in 2008 with a degree in graphic design. He then studied at the Rodchenko School of Photography and Multimedia (Moscow), graduated in 2013. Igor Samolet's first solo exhibition, Steam, took place at the Start Young Art Support Platform, Vinzavod, in 2012.

After graduating from the Rodchenko School, Igor Samolet was awarded the silver medal at the German Photo Book Award 2014, and his artworks were included in the 2014 edition of The Photobook: A History Volume III, edited by Martin Parr and Gerry Badger.

Samolet's projects Drunk Confessions and Breakfast for Artyom were shortlisted for the Innovation Prize in 2018. In 2019, Igor Samolet became a winner of the Credit Suisse award for young artists and the Cosmoscow International Contemporary Art Fair; from 2018 to 2019, Samolet received a grant from the Garage Museum of Contemporary Art within its program in support of Russian contemporary art. Igor Samolet has participated in international festivals and biennials, including the Parallel Programme of Manifesta 10, the 7th Triennial of Photography (Hamburg), the 6th Ural Industrial Biennial of Contemporary Art held in Yekaterinburg, Russia, and Athens Photo Festival 2018, Athens, Greece.

Igor Samolet has been working with his archive of digital content: personal messages, screenshots, and photographs, from which he creates installations. In 2018–2019, he began his colourful period (exhibition Energy of a Mistake at the Multimedia Art Museum, Moscow).

After 2021, Samolet moved to a black-and-white period, and in 2023, he began his concrete period. The latter period is characterised by artworks for the Dead End 2023 art fair at the ART4 Museum and the 2024 project Architecture of Relationships at the Narkomfin Building. In 2025, Igor Samolet began working on a new theme dedicated to Soviet Modernism, he no longer focuses on digital content: this indicates a new stage in his artistic practice.

== Selected solo exhibitions ==
- 2024 Architecture of Relationships, Garage Museum of Contemporary Art, Moscow, Russia
- 2023 The Steam From The Boiling Kettle Scorches The Rose Leaves; It Is in my Power To Stop It But I Do Nothing, szena gallery, Moscow, Russia
- 2022 Repressed Memories, Victoria Gallery, Samara, Russia
- 2022 Everything What We Remember, Stella Art Foundation, Moscow, Russia
- 2021 Politics of Hate, szena gallery, Moscow, Russia
- 2019–2020 Energy Of a Mistake, Multimedia Art Museum, Moscow, Russia
- 2018 Mutual Accusations, Vladimir Smirnov and Konstantin Sorokin Foundation, Moscow, Russia
- 2018 Herbarium & Circulation(s), 104 CENTQUATRE, Paris, France
- 2017 See Me More, Atelier AM ECK Gallery, Düsseldorf, Germany
- 2017 Breakfast for Artyom, Central Exhibition Hall Manege, Moscow, Russia
- 2012 Steam, Vinzavod Center for Contemporary Art, Moscow, Russia

== Selected group exhibitions ==
- 2024 Twenty-One Long, One Short. Contemporary Russian Art from the Collection of Anton Kozlov, Boris Yeltsin Presidential Center, Yekaterinburg, Russia
- 2022 Between the Lines. Textual in Visual, Triumph Gallery, Moscow, Russia
- 2022 Subtle Citizens, Moscow Museum of Modern Art, Moscow, Russia
- 2021 Raw and Cooked, Russian Museum of Ethnography, Saint Petersburg, Russia
- 2020–2021 Museum of Self-Isolation, Museum of Moscow, Moscow, Russia
- 2019 Ostlook Platform: How to Deal with History? The Folklore State Centre of Georgia, Tbilisi, Georgia
- 2019 Über Leben am Land, Kunst Haus Wien, Vienna, Austria
- 2018–2019 Digital Landscape, Havremagasinet, Boden, Sweden
- 2018 Athens Photo Festival:18, Benaki Museum, Athens, Greece
- 2018 Ostlook Exhibition. Contemporary Photography From East, VII Photography Triennale, Galerie 21 im Künstlerhaus Vorwerkstift, Hamburg, Germany
- 2018 Familienarchiv, Theater am Steg, Baden, Austria
- 2017 Rodchenko School. New Generation of Russian Art, Photography and Multimedia, Rinzinger Projekte, Vienna, Austria
- 2016 Only Unofficial Language, Vinzavod Center for Contemporary Art, Moscow, Russia
- 2016 Night of Photography, Tbilisi, Georgia
- 2016 F/STOP 2016 Festival for Photography, Baumwollspinnerei, Leipzig, Germany
- 2015 Paths, Hilger Next Gallery, Vienna, Austria
- 2014 Generation START," as part of Manifesta 10, Saint Petersburg, Russia
- 2013 The Happy End, Multimedia Art Museum, Moscow, Russia

== Selected collections ==
- Garage Museum of Contemporary Art
- Multimedia Art Museum Moscow
- Museum of Moscow
