= Claudius Schulze =

German artist and researcher (born 1984)

Claudius Schulzen
- Born: 1984 (age 41–42); Munich, Germany
- Education: University of the Arts London
- Known for: Photography
- Notable work: Socotra, die Dinge Europas, State of Nature
- Movement: Contemporary art

Claudius Schulze (born 1984) is a German artist and researcher. He is known for his large format landscape photography of social and political topics.

== Career ==
Claudius Schulze initially studied mechanical engineering and then Political and Islamic studies in Hamburg. He holds a master's degree in Conflict Analysis and Resolution from Sabanci University, Istanbul and graduated with distinction from the MA program "Photojournalism and Documentary photography" at the London College of Communication, University of the Arts London. While studying photography, he regularly contributed to various magazines e.g. Der Spiegel, Stern, and GEO

He is currently pursuing a PhD on AI and artistic research at the University of the Arts London.

Claudius Schulze is a regular university lecturer e.g. at Leuphana University Lüneburg, National Institute of Design, India, or University of Applied Sciences and Arts Hannover.

== Artistic work ==
In his first monograph "Socotra" (2011), Schulze takes on the character of the conqueror to explore a remote island. The work criticizes the dealing with the colonial heritage in cultural and particularly literary history.

His second photo book "State of Nature" documents the extent of climate change and natural disaster protection measures in the European landscape.

Claudius Schulze traveled with a self-built boat from Hamburg to Amsterdam and Paris to artistically explore the relationship between nature and urbanity. The results will be shown at the Triennial of Photography 2018.

== Awards and grants ==
- 2017: Paris Photo Aperture Award Shortlist for "State of Nature"
- 2016: Prix Pictet nomination for "State of Nature"
- 2016: Luma Rencontres d'Arles Dummy Award Shortlist for "State of Nature"
- 2014: Hansel Mieth Preis for the GEO story "Killer als Retter"
- 2013: „Vocer Medialab" grant for "Die Dinge Europas", in collaboration with journalist Oskar Piegsa
- 2012: VG Bild Kunst, Stiftung Kulturwerk grant to work on "State of Nature"
- 2012: As first photographer, Claudius Schulze was included in the list of best German young journalists „30 unter 30“ by Medium Magazin.

== Monographs and books ==
- State of Nature. Hartmann books, Stuttgart 2017, ISBN 978-3-96070-010-4.
- Socotra. An Island. Lonely Island Publishing, München 2011, ISBN 3000353380.
