= Jean-Paul Mari =

French author and journalist

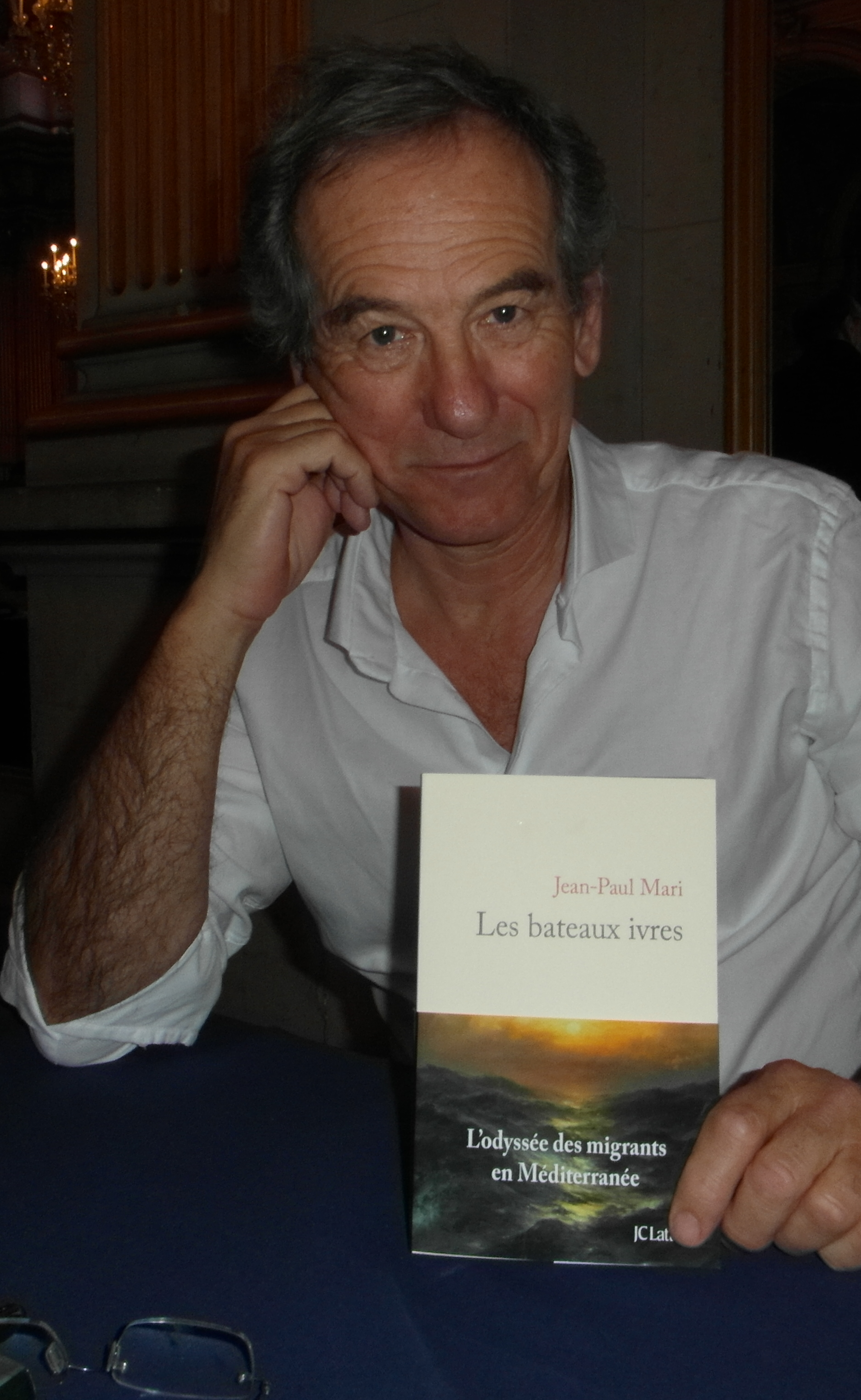
Jean Paul Mari

Jean-Paul Mari (born 1950) is a French author and journalist. He was born in 1950 in Algiers, leaving his birthplace at the age of 11. He studied psychology and worked as a physiotherapist at a hospital in Toulouse. He has since done stints as a radio host, radio reporter and print journalist. Since 1985, he has been attached with Le Nouvel Observateur.

As a war correspondent, Mari has published hundreds of stories covering the world, including conflicts in more than three dozen countries. His first book was L’homme qui survécut, published in 1989. He has since published several more volumes of reportage and released a documentary Irak, quand les soldats meurent (2006).

His awards include:

- Prix Albert Londres (1987).
- Prix des Organisations Humanitaires Agena (1989)
- Bayeux-Calvados Awards for war correspondents
- Prix Louis Hachette 2001
- Prix Méditerranée 2002 for his book on the Algerian civil war of the 1990s, Il faut abattre la lune. The book was later republished under the title La nuit algérienne.

His most recent book Sans blessures apparentes, published in 2008 won the Grand Prix des Lectrices de Elle 2009 and the Prix 3ème Assises du journalisme. A film made in 2010 from this book won the Grand Prix et le Prix du Public at the FIGRA, Festival International du Grand Reportage d’Actualité.
