= Jane Evelyn Atwood =

American photographer (born 1947)

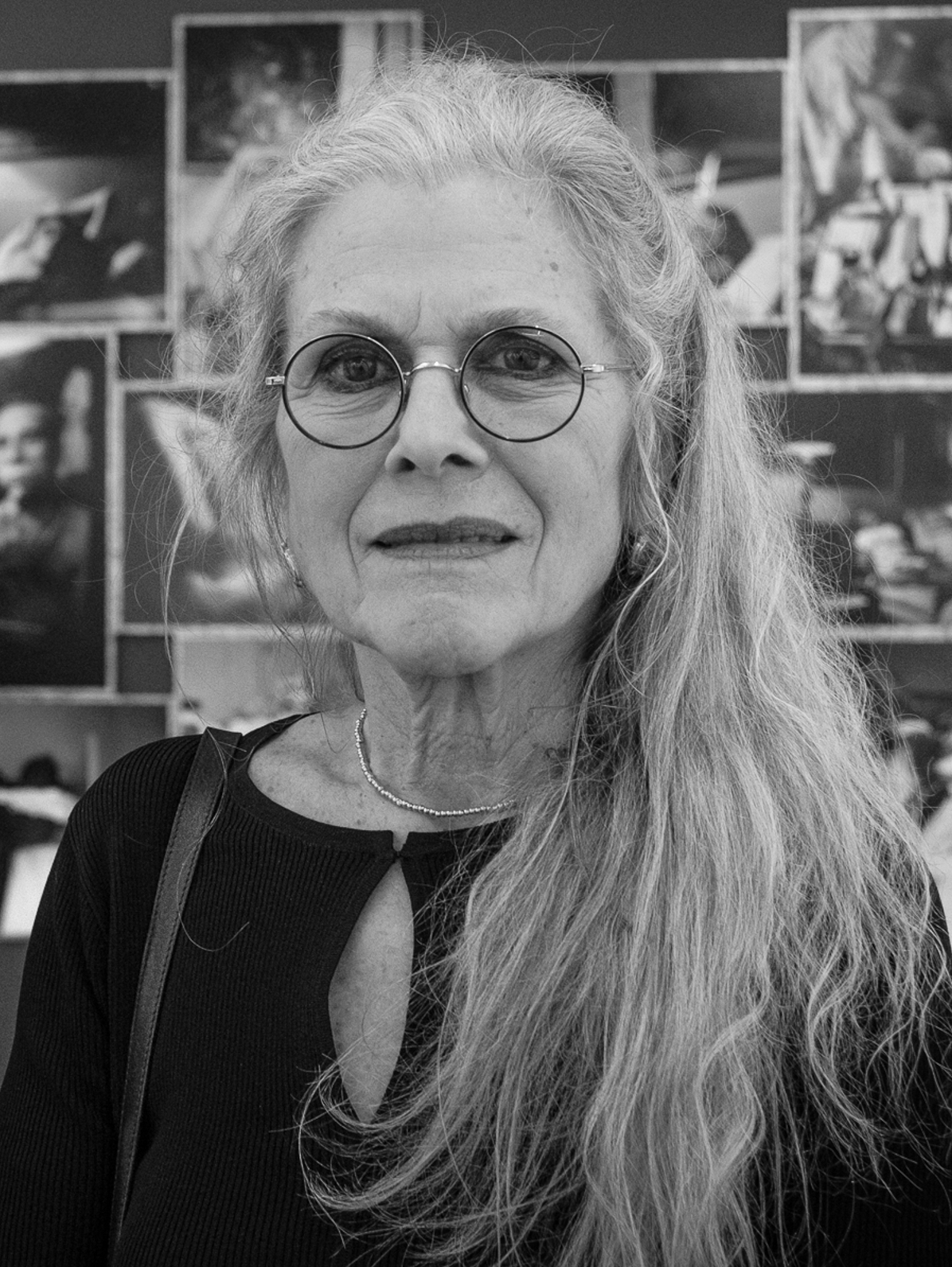
- Atwood in 2020
- Born: 1947 (age 78–79); New York City, U.S.
- Occupation: Photographer

Jane Evelyn Atwood (born 1947) is an American photographer, who has been living in Paris since 1971. Working primarily with documentary photography, Atwood typically follows groups of people or individuals, focusing mostly on people who are on the fringes of society. Atwood has had ten books of her work published, and received the W. Eugene Smith Grant in Humanistic Photography, the Grand Prix Paris Match for Photojournalism, the Oskar Barnack Award, the Alfred Eisenstaedt Award and the Hasselblad Foundation Grant twice.

== Career ==
Atwood acquired her first camera in 1975, with which she began to photograph a group of prostitutes in Paris. In 1980, she obtained a grant from the W. Eugene Smith Memorial Fund for a project she had started about blind children. Until then, she had never published a photograph.

=== Too Much Time: Women in Prison ===
In 1989, Atwood photographed women in prison for a ten-year-long photography study. She became inspired to accomplish this project after French prisons first refused her access to the men's quarters because she was a woman. She obtained access to more than 40 prisons, including the toughest prisons in Eastern and Western Europe and in the United States, as well as death row.

Too Much Time: Women in Prison is a ten-year photographic documentary study about women's experiences in prison and provides the readers with an exclusive insight on the treatment of inmates in a collection of 150 black and white photographs she took while meeting with prisoners who had agreed to be published in her book. Written between the pictures are the women's stories, presented in Tony Parker's lengthy interview style.

=== Rue des Lombards and other works ===
Other themes of Atwood's works include prostitutes in Paris (Rue des Lombards, 1976), blind children, Darfur, and Haiti. Atwood also did a four-year study of destruction caused by landmines in Cambodia, Angola, Kosovo, Mozambique, and Afghanistan (The Increasing Anonymity of the Enemy).

In addition, Atwood participated in neo-media projects organized by the French photography institution 24h.com.

In 2008, Atwood presented her work at the Rencontres d'Arles festival in France.

== Publications ==
- Rue des Lombards.
  - 1976.
  - Re-edited version. Editions Xavier Barral, 2011.
- Dialogues de Nuit. Éditions Jean-Jacques Pauvert/Ramsay, 1981.
- Nachtlicher Alltag. Mahnert-Lueg Verlag, 1981.
- Legionnaires. France: Hologramme, 1986.
- Exterieur Nuit. France: Éditions Actes Sud, Photo Poche Société, Centre National de Photo, 1998.
- Too Much Time: Women in Prison.
  - Too Much Time: Women in Prison. Phaidon, 2000.
  - Trop de Peines, Femmes en Prison. France: Editions Albin Michel.
- Sentinelles de l'ombre. Éditions du Seuil, 2004. Photographs and texts about landmine victims in Cambodia, Mozambique, Angola, Kosovo, and Afghanistan.
- A Contre Coups. Éditions Xavier Barral, 2006. In collaboration with Annette Lucas.
- Haiti. France: Actes Sud, Arles, 2008.
- Badate. Milan: Silvana Editoriale, 2008. A story of the immigration phenomenon of Ukrainian women who care for the Italian elderly.
- Jane Evelyn Atwood. Actes Sud, 2010. PhotoPoche series #125.

== Awards ==
- 1980: W. Eugene Smith Grant in Humanistic Photography, W. Eugene Smith Memorial Fund.
- 1983: Grant Fiacre of Culture Ministry, France.
- 1987: 3rd prize, Daily Life stories, World Press Photo Awards, World Press Photo, Amsterdam.
- 1988: Fiacre Grant of Culture Ministry, France.
- 1990: Paris-Match of Journalism Photo Award.
- 1994: Hasselblad Foundation Grant.
- 1996: Marc Flament of Ministry Defence Award.
- 1996: Grand Prix du Portfolio de la Societe Civile des Auteurs Multimedia (SCAM).
- 1997: Oskar Barnack Award, Leica Camera.
- 1998: Alfred Eisenstaedt Award for Magazine Photography.
- 2000: France Info Radio Award for "Trop de Peines, Femmes en Prison".
- 2003: Hasselblad Foundation Grant.
- 2005: Charles Flint Kellog Award in Arts and Letters, Bard College.

== Exhibitions ==
- 2011: Photographs 1976-2010, Maison européenne de la photographie, Paris. A retrospective.
