= Élisabeth Burdot =

Belgian journalist (1940–2021)

- Born: 18 January 1940; Uccle, Belgium
- Died: 22 January 2021 (aged 81); Brussels, Belgium
- Occupation: Journalist

Élisabeth Burdot (18 January 1940 – 22 January 2021) was a Belgian journalist. She worked for RTBF and specialized in investigative reporting.

== Biography ==
Burdot took an early interest in journalism, enrolling in the Maison de la Presse in Liège after secondary school. However, her career was halted when she met her husband, and spent several years abroad raising their two boys. She returned to journalism when she separated from him, and became first secretary of the International Association of Women and Home Page Journalists from 1971 to 1974. In 1976, she began working for radio, working on world broadcasts to Africa.

On 23 August 1978, she first appeared on television. Later in her career, she did many reports both in Belgium and abroad, including Ethiopia and the Republic of Congo. She also published reports in the RBTF magazines À suivre, La Rue d’à côté, C’est à voir, Ce soir, Plein cadre, L’Hebdo, and Actuel for 25 years. She headed the news staff for "Société" until 1986, and would present the 1:00 pm Sunday newscast from January 1987 to June 1989. In 1994, she was the inaugural winner, in the television journalism category, of the Bayeux Calvados-Normandy Award for war correspondents.

When she retired, she commented on her distaste for the fact that it was more difficult to create news reports at the end of her career than when it started.

Élisabeth Burdot died in Brussels, Belgium, on 22 January 2021 at the age of 81.
