= Suzanne Goldenberg =

Canadian-born author and journalist

- Born: Winnipeg, Manitoba, Canada
- Occupation: Journalist
- Known for: Reporting on the 2003 invasion of Iraq, the 2006 Lebanon War, and, most recently, environmental issues

Suzanne Goldenberg is a Canadian-born author and journalist. She is currently editing global enterprise for Reuters. She was previously employed by The Guardian as their United States environmental correspondent.

== Biography ==
Goldenberg was born and raised in Canada. She joined The Guardian in 1988, covering the break-up of the former Soviet Union, and later serving as The Guardian's South Asia and Middle East Correspondents. As Middle East correspondent, she covered the Palestinian intifada in 2000–2002, and in 2003 was one of the few western reporters based in Baghdad covering the US invasion of Iraq. She became The Guardian's US environment correspondent in 2009. She resides in Washington, D.C. with her family.

== Reporting ==
Goldenberg reported on many military conflicts early in her career, such as the wars in Chechnya, Georgia, and Nagorno Karabakh in the early 1990s, the Taliban takeover of Afghanistan in 1996, and the 2003 invasion of Iraq. She won a Bayeux-Calvados Award for war correspondents for her coverage in Iraq. She also has reported on the Israeli–Palestinian conflict, for which she was named the Reporter of the Year by What the Papers Say, the Foreign Press Association, and the London Press Club. She also received the London Press Club's Edgar Wallace Award in May 2001, and won the James Cameron Memorial Trust Award later that year. As The Guardian's United States environmental correspondent, she has been commended for her work on climate change and other environment issues. She has said her beat entails working in a "highly combustible atmosphere" similar to the one she experienced when reporting on the Israel-Palestine conflict.

== Books ==
Goldenberg has written two books: Pride of Small Nations: The Caucasus and Post-Soviet Disorder (1994), about the three countries in the Caucasus which had become independent of Russia after the collapse of the Soviet Union, as well as Chechnya and other non-Slavic republics seeking to redefine their relationship with Moscow, and Madam President: Is America ready to send Hillary Clinton to the White House? (2007), which focused on Clinton's political career and her first presidential campaign to become the Democrats' candidate for the following year's election.
