= Votsis =

Votsis (Greek: Βότσης) is a Greek surname. Notable people with the surname include:

- Dimitrios Votsis (1841–1917), mayor of Patras
- Gloria Votsis (born 1979), American actress
- Nikolaos Votsis (1877–1931), Greek naval officer

== See also ==
- Botsis
