= Olivier Laban-Mattei =

French photographer (born 1977)

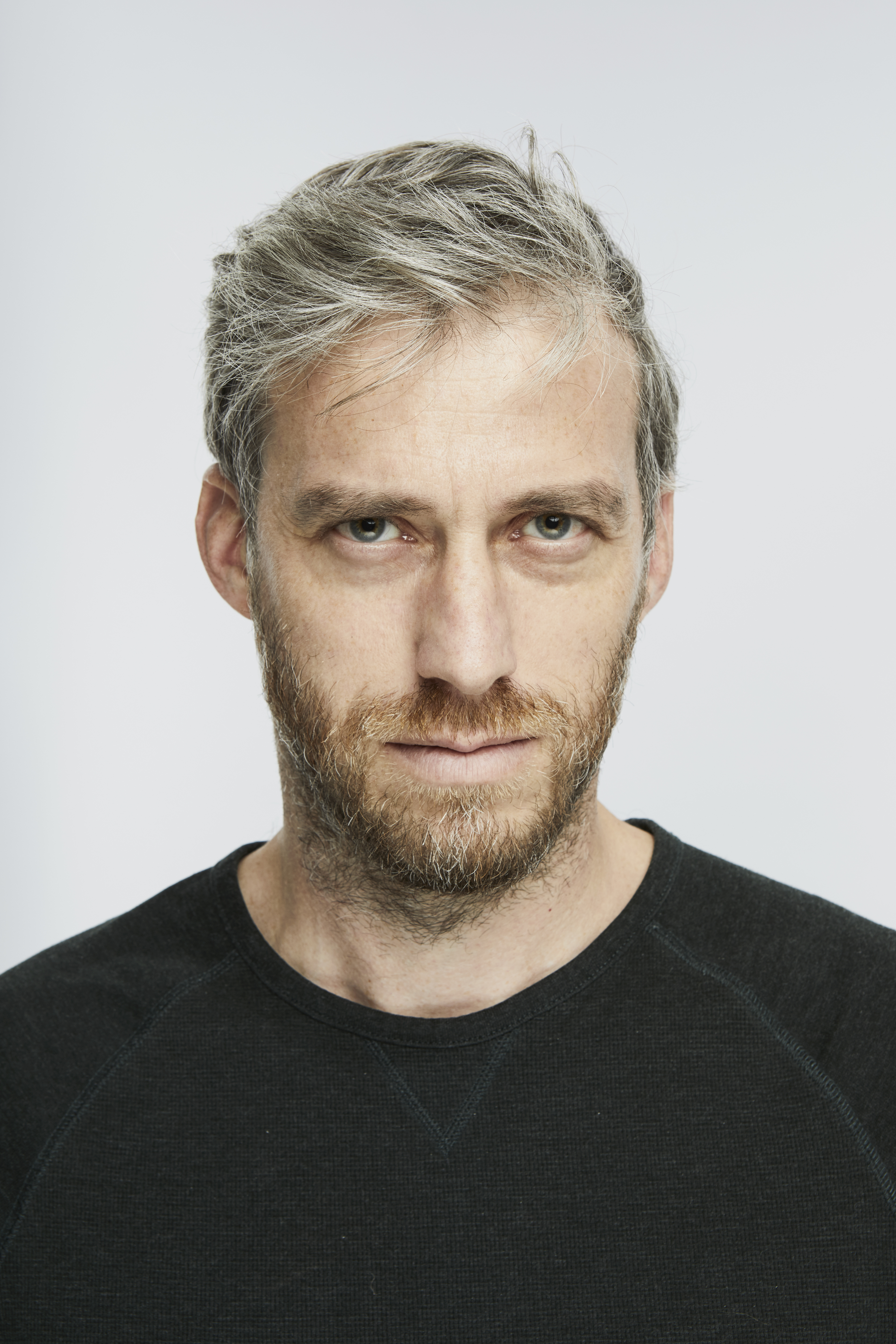
- Born: 17/03/1977
- Occupations: Photojournalist, Film director
- Awards: Paris Match Award (2006,2010), World Press Photo Award (2009, 2010, 2011]], Bayeux Calvados-Normandy Award for war correspondents (2010), Grant (1st prize) from La Scam for his video documentary, "Apnée" (with Baptiste de Cazenove, 2017).
- Website: https://labanmattei.photoshelter.com/index

Olivier Laban-Mattei is a French documentary photographer, photojournalist and film director. He won 3 World Press Photo awards.

== Biography ==
Olivier Laban-Mattei was born in Paris in 1977 and grew up there. He studied geography and sociology and became a self-taught photographer.

After 10 years at Agence France-Presse covering international news (wars in Iraq, Gaza, Georgia, the Iranian uprising, the earthquake in Haiti, Java, the cyclone in Burma...), he began a career as a freelance photographer in 2010.

While continuing to follow certain current events for newspapers (Tunisian revolution, war in Libya, war in Yemen, crisis in South Sudan...), he also devotes himself to long-term projects, such as the one carried out in Mongolia in 2013 and 2014 on the effects of pollution on society, for which he published a book, Mongols (ed Les Belles Lettres, 2013).

He collaborated with several humanitarian organizations and in 2014-2015 he worked with Baptiste de Cazenove to carry out in-depth work for the UNHCR on the Central African crisis and conflict-related traumas.

He has been a permanent member of the MYOP agency since 2013. He regularly works with French newspapers such as Le Monde, Libération or Le Figaro Magazine.

Between 2016 and 2019, in parallel with his photographic work, he co-directed the documentary film Breathless with Baptiste de Cazenove. In 2020, with his son Lisandru Laban-Giuliani, he started a project on Greenland society, Neige Noire, mixing photography and anticipation storytelling. He dedicates most of his current work to the question of the destructuring of societies and new forms of colonialism.

== Awards ==
- 2018, Public Prize of Days Japan (war in Yemen)
- 2017, Grant (1st prize) from La Scam for his video documentary, "Apnée" (with Baptiste de Cazenove).
- 2011: Best of Photojournalism 2011 (BOP-NPPA), 1st prize in "Natural Disaster" category
- 2011: World Press Photo, 1st prize story in General News category
- 2010: Paris-Match award, 1st prize
- 2010: Bayeux-Calvados Awards for war correspondents, 2nd prize
- 2010: Fotoweek DC, 3rd Prize - Series-Photojournalism/Social Documentary
- 2010: World Press Photo, 2nd Prize story in Spot News category
- 2010: Special award from the Jury of Days Japan
- 2010: Pictures of the year international (POYi), Award of excellence
- 2010: Pictures of the year international (POYi), 2nd Prize
- 2009: Special award from the Jury of the international festival of photojournalism of Gijon
- 2009: World Press Photo, 3rd prize story in General News category
- 2007: Bendrihem's 1st prize for the best European political photo
- 2006: Paris-Match award, 1st prize
