= Kurt Schork =

American and Bosnian journalist (1947–2000)

- Born: Kurt Erich Schork; January 14, 1947; Washington, D.C., United States
- Died: May 24, 2000 (aged 53); Sierra Leone
- Resting place: Sarajevo, Washington, D.C.
- Occupation: Journalist
- Years active: 1986–2000

Kurt Schork (January 24, 1947 – May 24, 2000) was an American war correspondent, working for Reuters.

== Biography ==
He was born on January 24, 1947 in Washington, D.C. He graduated from Jamestown College in 1969, and studied at Oxford University as a Rhodes scholar later that year—the same time as future United States President Bill Clinton. Schork worked as a property developer, a political adviser, and then chief of staff for the New York City Transit Authority before becoming a journalist.

As a journalist, Schork headed for the Middle East, deciding to concentrate on Kurdistan. Because of the large numbers of similarly-minded reporters, Kurt had more success selling photos rather than stories. His break came in October 1991, when he witnessed Kurdish guerrillas counter-attack Iraqi forces who were shelling the Kurdish city of Sulaymaniyah.

When the Bosnian War began, Reuters sent him to Sarajevo. His reporting of the siege of Sarajevo had a widespread impact, mobilising public opinion and prompting NATO to intervene. Schork arrived in Bosnia in the summer of 1992 and stayed until 1997. He left Sarajevo in 1997 when he moved to Washington D.C. He also covered numerous conflicts and wars, including Iraq, Chechnya, Iraqi Kurdistan, Sri Lanka, and East Timor.

=== Death ===
Kurt Schork was killed in an ambush while on an assignment for Reuters in Sierra Leone together with cameraman Miguel Gil Moreno de Mora of Spain, who worked for Associated Press Television. Two other Reuters journalists, South African cameraman Mark Chisholm and Greek photographer Yannis Behrakis, were also injured in the attack.

Schork was posthumously awarded a Bosnian passport for his reporting during the Bosnian War.

== Romeo and Juliet in Sarajevo ==
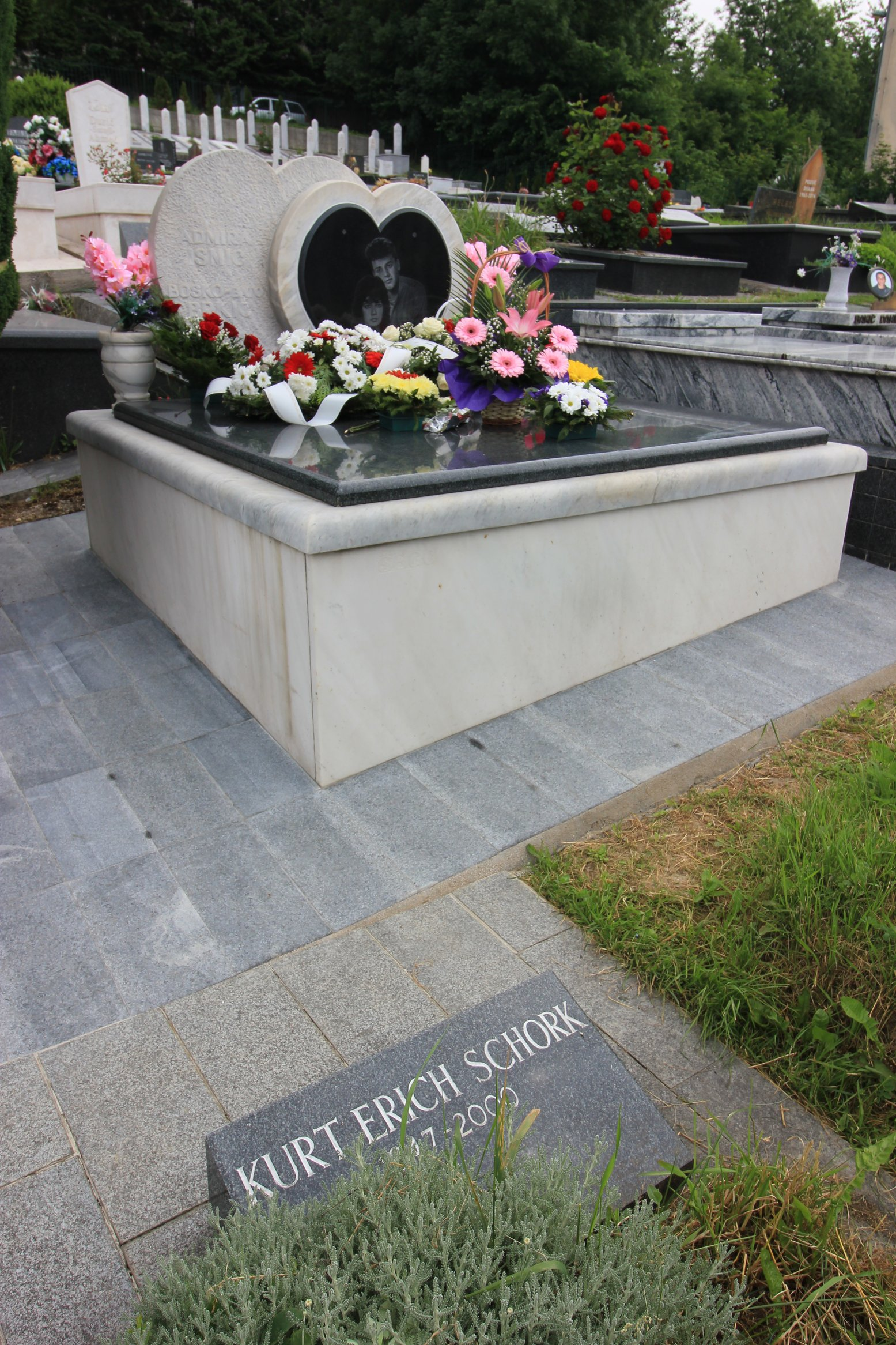
Schork's grave at Lav cemetery, Sarajevo

In April 1996, he filed the story Romeo and Juliet in Sarajevo, about a young couple, Boško Brkić (an Eastern Orthodox Bosnian Serb) and Admira Ismić (a Muslim Bosniak), who were killed during the Siege of Sarajevo. Admira's and Boško's relationship defied the ethnic hatred which followed the breakup of the former Yugoslavia. After being shot and killed by snipers while attempting to flee the area, their bodies remained unreachable on a bridge in no man's land for eight days as the war raged on. They became known as Romeo and Juliet as the story of their unshakable love emerged. Before they made the decision to flee, the young couple were serving as surrogate parents to the young sons of Admira's cousin, Brana, who was killed in Sarajevo by a 60-millimeter shell while putting her sons to sleep. Boško's decision to flee with Admira was influenced by the fact that his grandfather was summoned in Croatia to a police station by pro-Hitler Fascists during World War II and never seen again.

After Schork died, as per his personal wishes, upon cremation half of his ashes was buried next to his mother in Washington, D.C., and half at "Groblje Lav" (The Lion Cemetery) in Sarajevo, next to the grave of Boško and Admira.

== Legacy ==
Schork has been memorialized posthumously in: the dedication of Kurt Schork Street in Sarajevo, and citizenship of Bosnia and Herzegovina: in the dedication of the Kurt Schork newsroom at Jamestown College, his alma mater; and in the documentary Romeo and Juliet in Sarajevo.

=== Kurt Schork Memorial Fund and Awards ===
The goal of the Kurt Schork Memorial Fund and Awards recognizes and assists freelance journalists, local journalists and news fixers who make a critical contribution to international understanding but whose work is often overlooked. The awards include three cash prizes of $5,000 each to provide some financial support to help the winners continue reporting. Though local journalists in the developing world take extraordinary risks to expose corruption and injustice in their countries, they rarely earn enough money to support themselves and their families. Similarly, freelancers live from job to job, never knowing when the next assignment will come, where it may lead or how long it will last. The News Fixer Award, newly introduced in 2017, aims to recognise the rarely credited yet often at-risk individuals who typically act as the correspondent’s eyes and ears on the ground. It is the fixers’ local knowledge, as well as their network of official – and unofficial – contacts that helps to secure critical interviews and access to all important areas for the out-of-town correspondents. The prize was inspired by the freelance journalist, author and friend of Kurt Schork, Anna Husarska, and pays tribute to the vital role that these unsung heroes play in coverage from difficult, dangerous and hostile locations. With these awards, the Fund spotlights the plight and achievements of freelance journalists, local reporters and news fixers.
