= Charles Biasiny-Rivera =

American photographer (1930–2024)

Charles Biasiny-Rivera (November 10, 1930 – August 10, 2024) was an American photographer. He was the co-founder of En Foco, a collective of Puerto Rican photographers based in New York City.

== Biography ==
Charles Biasiny-Rivera was born into a Puerto Rican family on November 10, 1930, on Roosevelt Island in New York City. His father was a merchant seaman and his mother was a factory worker. He grew up in the South Bronx. In his teens, he taught himself photography by using a cheap plastic camera and reading library books detailing film processing.

Biasiny-Rivera left Metropolitan High School at the age of 14. Upon reaching the age of service, he joined the Air National Guard. In 1952, he joined the United States Air Force and was stationed in Korea during the Korean War, where he worked as a military photographer. After his service in the military, Biasiny-Rivera moved back to New York City where he worked as a photographic assistant. He worked for photographer Cecil Beaton when he came to New York, prepping his cameras, lenses, and lighting.

In 1974, Biasiny-Rivera co-founded En Foco, an artistic collective centered on documenting Latino life, with photographers Roger Cabán and Felipe Dante. Together, they set up pop-up exhibitions in Latino neighborhood parks, using Biasiny-Rivera's Volkswagen bus. They focused their efforts on East Harlem and the South Bronx. Members of the group mostly developed a singular focus for their work, Biasiny-Rivera did not specialize, later stating that he "just wanted to roam and discover." En Foco would go on to become a non-profit organization where Biasiny-Rivera was the executive director for 35 years. He oversaw the publication of Nueva Luz, a photographic journal which focused on cultural diversity.

In the 1990s, Biasiny-Rivera had artist residencies at Light Work and then the Belagio Center of the Rockefeller Foundation at Lake Como in Italy. During this time, he created composite images using black and white photographs that he hand-colored and then surrounded with intricate borders and hand-written poetry.

In 2004, Biasiny-Rivera received the New York City Mayor's Award for Arts and Culture.

From 2021 to 2022, El Museo del Barrio presented the exhibition "En Foco: The New York Puerto Rican Experience, 1973–74". It was based upon a single portfolio of 79 photographs by the founding members of En Foco; Biasiny-Rivera, Cabán, and Dante.

== Personal life and death ==
In the early 1970s, Biasiny-Rivera bought a 19th-century barn in Olivebridge, New York, that he converted into a home.

In 1988, Biasiny-Rivera married Betty Wilde, and they had a daughter, Amelia Francesca.

Biasiny-Rivera died due to complications of lung cancer at his home in Olivebridge, on August 10, 2024, at the age of 93.
