= Reza Deghati =

Iranian-French photojournalist

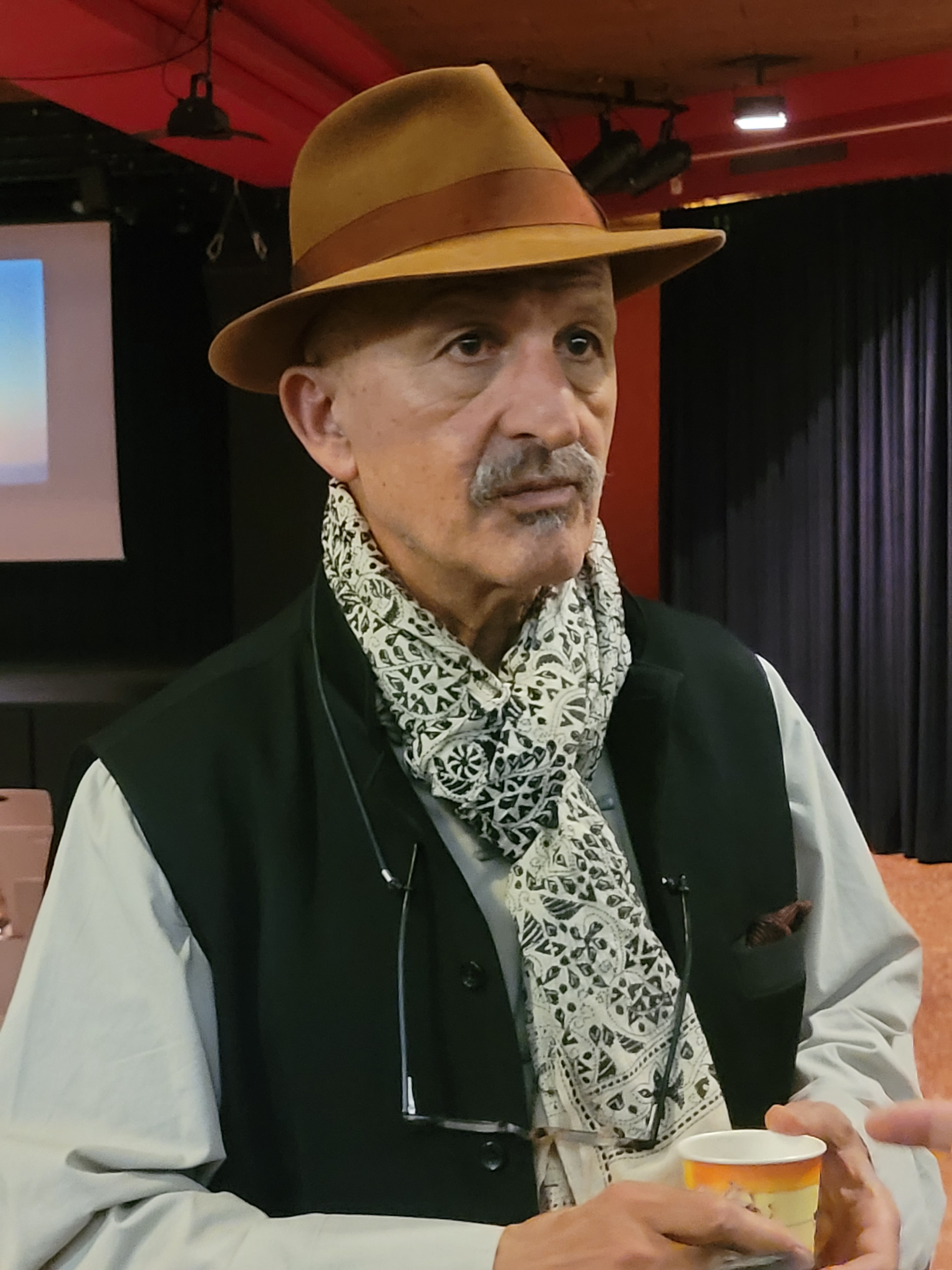
- Reza Deghati (2023)
- Born: July 26, 1952 (age 73); Tabriz, Iran
- Occupation: Photojournalist
- Website: rezaphotography.org

Signature
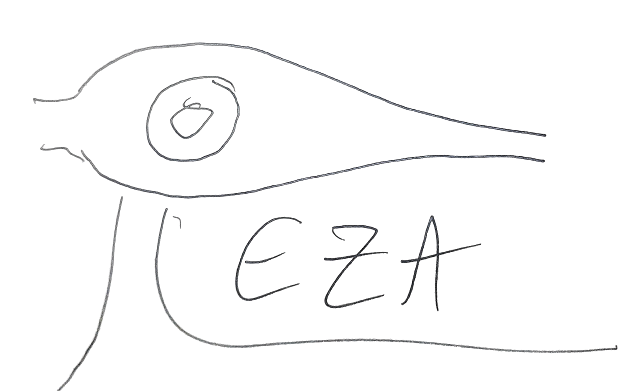

Reza Deghati (Persian: رضا دقتی; born July 26, 1952) is an Iranian-French photojournalist.

== Early life ==
Reza was born in Tabriz, Iran. He is ethnically Azerbaijani. Reza's career began with studies in architecture. Following his passion for photography, he became a photographer. He took his first photograph at 14, and at 16 he published a high school magazine called Parvaz. He clandestinely displayed his photographs on the University of Tehran grids. For his artistic activism, he was arrested at 22, jailed for three years, and tortured for five months.

== Life and work ==
In 1979, he left architecture to become a photojournalist. He covered the Iranian Revolution for the Sipa Press agency and Newsweek magazine. He was finally forced into exile in 1981 for his photographs published in the international press. Then he decided to move to Paris, France. For nearly four decades, Reza has covered a large part of the globe for international media (Time Magazine, Stern, Newsweek, El País, Paris Match and Geo...), notably for National Geographic His assignments have taken him to over a hundred countries. His photographs are testimony to the chaos of War, its ravages and the helplessness of human beings caught in the storm. They also tell the world's cultures, traditions, history, and, most of all, Reza's infallible hope for a better world. Year, 1991 marks the beginning of a long and close collaboration with National Geographic magazine, for which he carries out many subjects. His photographs were the subject of 25 covers of the magazine. The following year, Reza co-founded in Paris, with his wife Rachel Deghati, a writer, a studio around the image and words, the agency Webistan Photo Agency. Reza is quickly convinced that there are as many ways to tell a story as media, press publications, web-documentaries, exhibitions, installations in the public space, documentaries made by him or on his work, books and conferences are all complementary means of talking about a subject he is witnessing. Since its creation, its agency has helped to implement its different projects.

Over the last three decades, Reza's photographs have been on the covers of National Geographic Magazine, with more featured in international publications. He is also the author of seventeen books, including War+Peace, the first in a series entitled Masters of Photography by National Geographic, and most recently, Sindhbad, Reza's adaptation of the seven journeys of this mystical character from the classic tale, A Thousand and One Nights. A Childhood Promise is the story of discovery, narrated by three people, about a promise made by Reza to his son, Delazad.

=== National Geographic ===
He has worked internationally for National Geographic Magazine. National Geographic Television has produced several films about Reza's work, most notably Frontline Diaries, which won an Emmy Award in 2002. In 2003, Reza served as Creative Director for National Geographic's most viewed documentary, Inside Mecca. As part of its Exceptional Journeys series, National Geographic released a documentary looking at Reza's career as a photojournalist, with special features highlighting his extensive humanitarian work.

=== Volunteer and educator ===
Since 1983 Reza has been a volunteer committed to training in the language of the image, of the population from conflict-ridden societies to help them strive for a better world. In 1990, he interrupted his career as a photojournalist and became a consultant to the United Nations in Afghanistan for nine months in a program of reconstruction and assistance to the population in the Northern provinces of the country. He took his cameras to start working for National Geographic Magazine but pursued actions undertaken voluntarily. In 1996 in Rwanda, he worked alongside UNICEF and the ICRC to continue a photo tracing operation initiated by these two organizations allowing parents to find their children lost during the mass exodus from Rwanda to refugee camps. From the Democratic Republic of Congo, 12,000 children's portraits were posted in IDP camps. In 1998, Reza got involved in school construction for refugee children in Baku, Azerbaijan. In 1991, Reza served as a consultant to the United Nations in Afghanistan, helping to distribute food to populations in war-torn parts of the country. In 2001, he founded Aina (Persian for The Mirror), an international new generation non-profit organization that opened a first center in Kabul, Afghanistan—dedicated to educating and empowering dedicated to educating and empowering Afghan women and children through the media. By providing educational opportunities in the field of communications and multimedia. Aina aimed to equip Afghans with the skills to build a self-sufficient, democratic, and unified country. For his work on such humanitarian causes and because of his work with Aina in Afghanistan, National Geographic awarded him the title of National Geographic Fellow in 2006. In 2009, after training 1,000 Afghans, including the 2012 Pulitzer Prize winner Massoud Hossaini the association became completely independent and Afghan led.

Reza has continued to conduct workshops to youths around the world (Italian and French suburbs, refugee camps in Iraqi Kurdistan, favelas in Buenos Aires, center for displaced youth in Bamako etc.). By founding the non-profit organization Reza Visual Academy, which seeks to form young people between 11 and 20 years in the language of the image through the photographic tool. Passive victims, become visual witnesses and, therefore actors in their destiny. His humanitarian work and photojournalism have been recognized by international institutions and universities, including George Washington University, Stanford University, Beijing University, and the Sorbonne in Paris.

He spends much of his time as a lecturer, trainer, and visiting professor, giving presentations and running workshops on global issues. His humanitarian work and photojournalism have been recognized by international institutions and universities, including George Washington University, Stanford University, Beijing University and the Sorbonne in Paris. He also participated in documentary projects for the French photography website 24h.com. Reza's photographs have been exhibited throughout the world. War+Peace (2009), an exhibit featuring thirty years worth of Reza's photojournalistic adventures, was held at the Caen Memorial (Peace Museum) in Normandy, France. One World, One Tribe (2006), was the National Geographic Museum's first outdoor exhibition in Washington D.C., and Reza's landmark exhibition in Paris, drew a million visitors.

== Exhibitions ==
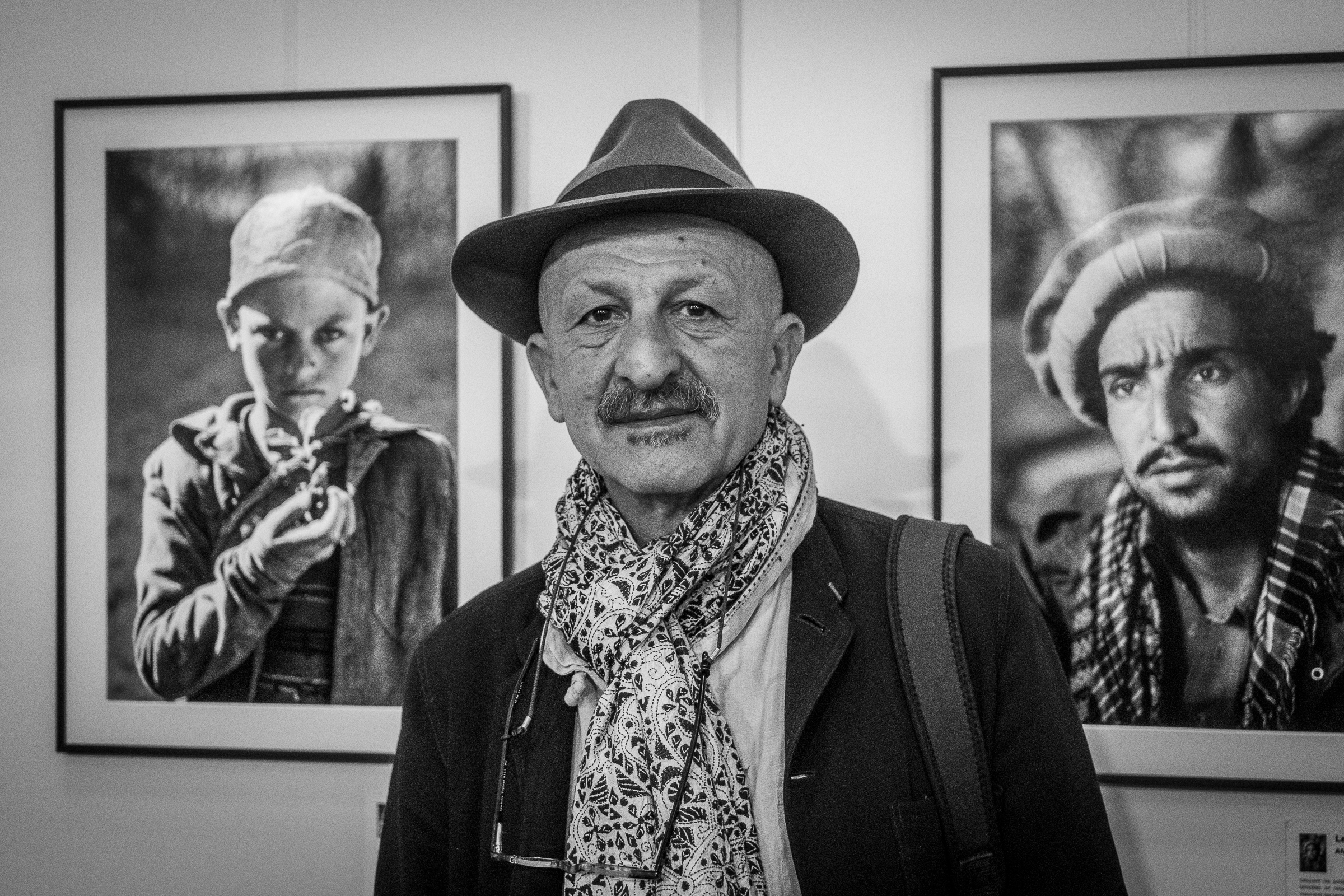
Reza Deghati in Strasburg exhibition (2022)

Reza's photographs have been exhibited in major cities throughout the world. From monumental installations in the public space to more modest local exhibitions, Reza strives to make photography accessible to all. In 1998, he installed, for the first time in public space, at the Carrousel du Louvre, an exhibition Mémoires d'exil. This begins a long series of original installations outside museums, allowing everyone to meet visual art and information. Thus, to cite only these, Destins Croisés, on the grids of the Jardin du Luxembourg in Paris in 2003, One World, One Tribe, first exhibition of the National Geographic Museum in Washington DC in 2006, War + Peace, exposed in 2009 at the Caen Memorial in Normandy and in 2011 on the banks of the Garonne in Toulouse. There are nearly 450 photographic exhibitions in France and abroad, including major installations on the Corniche in Doha (Qatar), in the major cities of Corsica, at Kew Gardens in London, at the UN headquarters in New York City, Parliament in Brussels, as well as UNESCO, the Petit Palais museum and the banks of the Seine in Paris. In 2013, Reza has designed, the first 370-meter giant mural along the banks of the Seine facing the Musée d'Orsay, dedicated to Coffee Workers around the world. In 2015, he reiterated the same major installation entitled Dream of Humanity. It presents his photographic work on refugees around the world as well as the photographs taken by young Syrian refugees in a camp in Iraqi Kurdistan who have followed since the end of 2013 the photography training of her association Reza Workshops. In 2018, he exhibited his work Face to Face in China.

- Crossing Destinies (2003) in Paris on the fences of the Jardin du Luxembourg.
- One World, One Tribe (2006) photographic exhibition at the National Geographic Museum in Washington, D.C.
- HOPE (2012) a photographic exhibition at the Sheraton Park on the Corniche in Doha.
- A Dream of humanity (2015) along the banks of the Seine in Paris opposite the Orsay museum (photos by Reza over the past 30 years, portraits of refugees by photographer Ali Bin Thalith and photographs taken by Syrian refugee children living in Kawergosk refugee camp in Iraq).

and André Coutin, Le pinceau de Bouddha, La Martinière, 2002

- Painted Buddhas of Xinjiang, translated by Ian West, The British Museum Press, 2002
- Plus loin sur la Terre, Hors Collection, 2002
- Destins Croisés – Carnets d’un reporter photographe, Hors Collection, 2003
- Insouciances, Castor & Pollux, 2004
- Sur la Route de la Soie, Hoëbeke, 2007
- Reza War + Peace, Focal Point, 2008
- Reporters Sans Frontières - 100 photos pour la liberté de la presse, RSF, 2008
- Vers l’Orient, Sindbad par Reza, Glénat, 2009
- Chemins Parallèles, Hoëbeke, 2009
- Sindbad by Reza, Glénat, 2009
- derrière l'Objectif, Hoëbeke, 2010
- Les âmes rebelles (Rebellious souls), Democratic Books, 2010
- L’Envol, La Conférence des Oiseaux (Soaring : The Conference Of The Birds), Democratic Books, 2010
- Algérie, Michel Lafon, 2012
- Learning a living, Bloomsbury Qata Foundation Publishing, 2012
- Chants de Café, Michel Lafon Editions, Neuilly-sur-Seine, 2013.
- L'élégance du feu, Paris, Webistan Paris, 2014
- Le Massacre des Innocents, Webistan, Paris, 2014
- Kurdistan Renaissance, Webistan, Paris, 2017
- "Iran, Rêves et Dérives" Hoebeke/Gallimard publisher, Paris, 2019;

== Awards and distinctions ==
In 1996, Reza won the Hope Prize for contributing to a joint project with UNICEF in Rwanda entitled Lost Children's Portraits. In 2005, he was awarded the Chevalier de l’Ordre National du Mérite, France's highest civilian honor, for his philanthropic work in children's education and women's empowerment in the empowerment of women in the media. In 2006, Spain's Crown Prince Felipe presented him with the Prince of Asturias Humanitarian Medal on behalf of National Geographic. The same year, Reza received the Honor Medal from the University of Missouri - Columbia School of Journalism “in recognition of his lifelong contributions, through photojournalism, to justice and dignity for the world’s citizens." He also received an award recognizing his humanitarian work from the University of Chicago. In 2008, Reza became a senior fellow of the Ashoka Foundation, and in May 2009, he received the Honorary Degree of Doctor Honoris Causa from the American University of Paris (AUP) for his achievements in journalism and humanitarianism. In October 2009, he received the Lucie Award for Achievement in Documentary from the New York-based Lucie Foundation and in May 2010, in New York, the Infinity Award of ICP (International Center of Photography) honored Reza for his latest report on Afghanistan; “Once upon a time, the Russian Empire”, in Photojournalism category.

- 1983 World Press Photo Second Prize
- 1996 UNICEF Hope Prize for his work on Rwandan Refugee Camps
- 2005 Chevalier de l'ordre National du Mérite
- 2006 Prince of Asturias Prize as a representative of National Geographic Society
- 2006 Missouri Honor Medal of best journalist
- 2008 Senior fellow of the Ashoka Foundation
- 2009 "Doctor Honoris Causa" from the American University of Paris (AUP) for his achievements in journalism and humanitarianism
- 2009 Lucie Award for Achievement in Documentary from the New York-based Lucie Foundation
- 2010 International Center of Photography Infinity Award
- 2010 Human Rights Award Special Mention “Flying from the nest”
- 2013 Photography Appreciation Award, Dubai
- 2013 National Geographic Society Explorer
- 2022 Dostlug Order, Azerbaijan
