= Wolfgang Bauer (journalist) =

German journalist (born 1970)

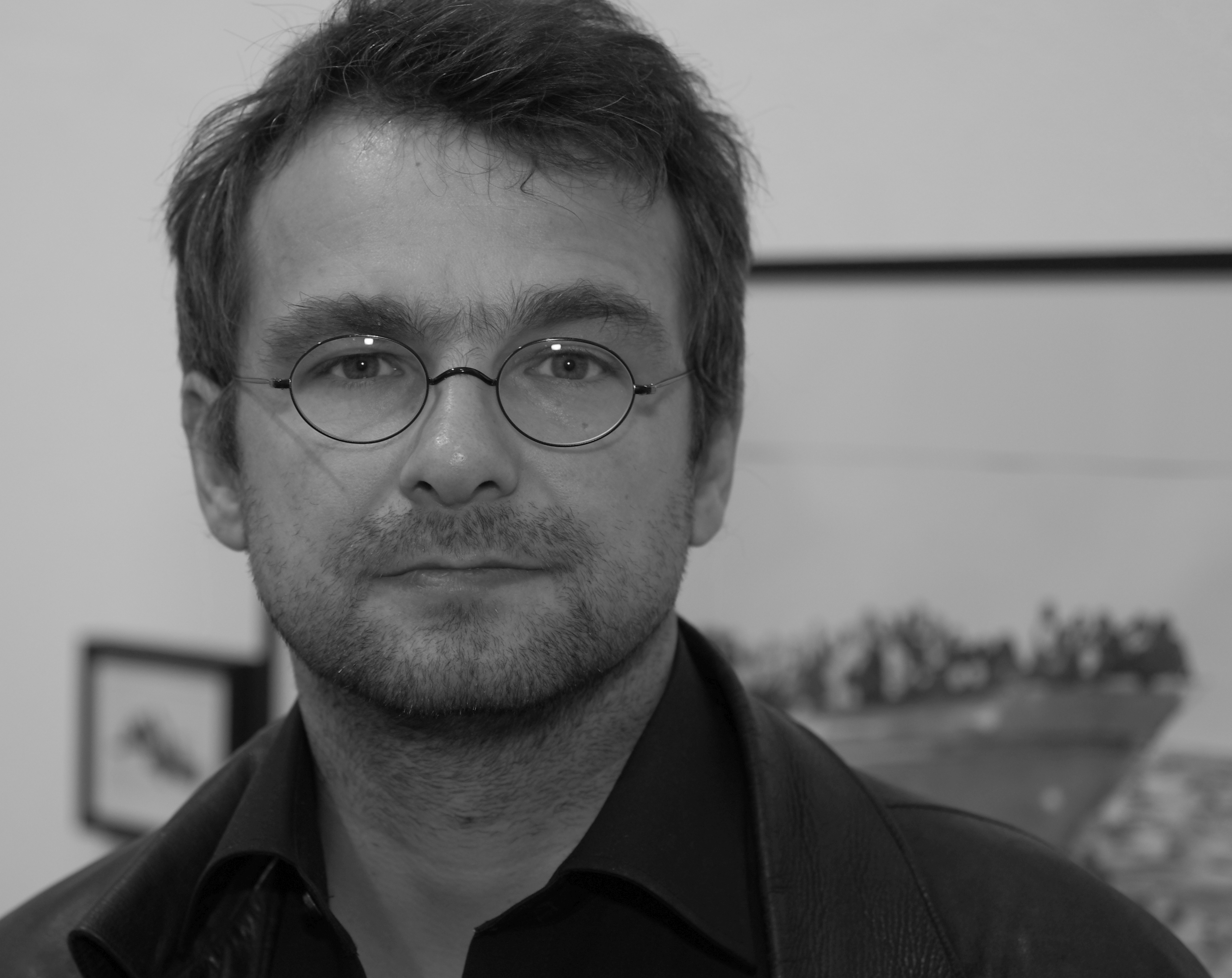
- Wolfgang Bauer in 2015.
- Born: Wolfgang Bauer; 1970 (age 55–56)
- Occupations: Journalist, reporter, author
- Notable work: Crossing the Sea: With Syrians on the Exodus to Europe

Wolfgang Bauer (born 1970) is a German journalist and reporter for Die Zeit, who has won many prizes including the Prix Bayeux Calvados for War Correspondents. He has worked in the Arab world for many years, including in war zones in Syria and Libya.

His second Prix Bayeux-Calvados for War Correspondents was awarded for the Syrian refugee reportage in Die Zeit that formed the basis of the book Crossing the Sea: With Syrians on the Exodus to Europe (And Other Stories, 2016), in which he and photographer Stanislav Krupař went undercover as English teachers and accompanied Syrian refugees attempting to travel from Egypt to Europe.

He was a reporter for the German magazine Focus, Zeit Dossier, Neon/Nido, Greenpeace Magazine and National Geographic. In 2011 he was awarded the European Award for Excellence in Journalism Columbus.

In June 2007 Bauer reported that, when embedded with the American 82nd Airborne Division he witnessed Afghan and American soldiers, in the area of Ghazni, Afghanistan, abusing captured suspects.

== Abuse reports ==
Bauer, and his photographer, Karsten Schoene, said they witnessed one Afghan suspect, tied a truck, and threatened that he would be dragged behind the truck if he continued to decline to answer questions. The Afghan platoon leader who was questioning the suspect then had an American soldier from the 82nd Airborne Division, turn on and gun the truck's engine. Focus published a picture of the Afghan suspect, tied to the truck's bumper. Bauer called this act a mock execution and wrote that this act rose to the level of torture, and was a war crime,

Bauer wrote that, in addition, the suspect's family had been threatened. In a separate incident he reported he had seen an agent of the Afghan intelligence service beat a suspect with a rifle butt, while questioning him.

Major Chris Belcher, speaking on behalf of the Department of Defense, stated that he was unaware of the incident.
