= Miguel Gil Moreno de Mora =

Spanish and Bosnian journalist (1967–2000)

- Born: June 21, 1967; Barcelona, Spain
- Died: May 24, 2000 (aged 32); Sierra Leone
- Citizenship: Spain, Bosnia and Herzegovina
- Occupation: Journalist

Miguel Gil Moreno de Mora (June 21, 1967 – May 24, 2000) was a Spanish and Bosnian cameraman and war correspondent, working for Associated Press.

== Biography ==
Moreno was born in Barcelona but spent most of his childhood in Tarragona. His father was killed in a traffic accident when he was a teenager, after which he and his family returned to Barcelona where he would finish high school. He graduated from the University of Barcelona with a degree in law. After a successful career as a corporate lawyer in Barcelona, Spain, Moreno became a freelance war correspondent first in Sarajevo and later, an award winning cameraman for AP Television.

Leaving behind his career as a corporate lawyer in Spain, Moreno became a freelance war correspondent in Sarajevo and later in Kosovo, where he was one of the few Western cameraman to stay in Pristina during the NATO air campaign.

Next, Moreno went to Grozny. His pictures from Chechnya were a rare means for the world to see Grozny's fate. He also covered Congo, Liberia, Rwanda, Sudan and Sierra Leone. However, as he wrote himself, he experienced the most dangerous moments of his life in Chechnya.

Miguel was awarded as cameraman of the year by the Royal Television Society in 2000, recognizing its outstanding job in conflict areas.

Miguel Gil Moreno de Mora and Reuters Correspondent Kurt Schork were shot to death in during the ambush of a Sierra Leone Army (SLA) convoy by the Revolutionary United Front on May 24, 2000. During the attack, four SLA soldiers were killed and two other journalists, South African cameraman Mark Chisholm and Greek photographer Yannis Behrakis, were injured.

Moreno was "a big man — big of heart," in the words of AP photographer Santiago Lyon.
