= Alastair Leithead =

English journalist

- Born: 21 January 1972 (age 54); Amersham
- Education: University of Manchester
- Occupation: Journalist
- Notable credit: BBC News

Alastair Malcolm Leithead (/ˈliːθhɛd/; born 1972) is an English journalist and foreign correspondent for the BBC. He has reported from Afghanistan, Africa, Asia and the United States, and was based in Nairobi from 2015 to 2019.

Leithead was based in Nairobi from 2015 to 2019. He works across all BBC News outlets.

== Early life ==
Alastair Leithead was born in Amersham to Arthur Leithead, a security manager, and Edna Leithead (née Mooney), a teacher in private education. He was raised in Blaydon-on-Tyne and educated at the Royal Grammar School, Newcastle. He then went to the University of Manchester to study geography.

== Career ==
=== Early career ===
After graduating from the university, Leithead worked at the Newcastle Evening Chronicle before joining BBC Radio Newcastle. Later he worked as a news producer in London.

=== Foreign reporting ===
As a foreign correspondent, Leithead has been based in Africa and Asia before moving to Kabul. There he covered the war in Afghanistan. Leithead has reported from a refugee camp in South Sudan. More recently, he has been based in Los Angeles before being relocated to Kenya as the BBC's Africa Correspondent in July 2015.

== Awards ==
Leithead won the 2007 Bayeux-Calvados Awards for war correspondents Television Award for his war reporting. In 2005/6 he was shortlisted for the Royal Television Society's TV Journalism Award, and in 2008 he was shortlisted for a BAFTA for best news coverage.
