= En Foco =

En Foco is a non-profit organization that nurtures contemporary fine art and documentary photographers of diverse cultures, primarily U.S. residents of Latino, African and Asian heritage, and native peoples of the Americas and the Pacific.

Founded in 1974 and inspired by the civil rights movement, it has been in the forefront of documenting the artistic journeys created by photographic artists often overlooked by the mainstream art world.

En Foco has created exhibitions, workshops, fellowships and a permanent collection. The organization supports its constituent artists with direct and indirect funding opportunities.

Through its visual arts programs, En Foco strives to balance the inequities of the art world by creating the 'missing pages' in art history. In 1984 it created the bilingual (English/Spanish) photographic magazine Nueva Luz, which concentrates on works by U.S.-based photographers of color. Some photographers En Foco has exhibited or written about are Hank Willis Thomas, Sama Raena Alshaibi, Juan Sánchez, Hong-An Truong and Víctor Vázquez.

== History ==
Inspired by the 1973 traveling exhibition Dos Mundos (organized by the Institute of Contemporary Hispanic Art and exhibited in New York City, Los Angeles and Puerto Rico), a group of Puerto Rican photographers - Charles Biasiny-Rivera, Phil Dante, and Roger Cabán - banded together to form the core En Foco group and incorporated in 1974.

In 2012 en exhibition of a selección of En Foco’s permanent collection was presented at the Art Museum of the Americas and included works by Chuy Benitez and Lola Flash among others.

== Publications ==
- Bonilla, Fred. "Calidad y Claridad: The Fine Work of En Foco". Photoinduced.com. March 9, 2008.
- Cotter, Holland (May 7, 1999). "Way Up in the Bronx a Hardy Spirit Blooms". The New York Times.
- Herrera, Monica. "Mujeres on the Move". Latina, August 2007.
- "Seeing Differently: Photo Magazines with an Angle". Utne Magazine, Sept-Oct 2003
- Survey of Archives of Latino and Latin American Art, Museum of Modern Art, New York
- Swerdlin, Ilana. "En Foco Celebrates 30 Years". Afterimage, Issue 33.1
- Zimmer, Wiliam. "En Foco Collection Finds a Permanent Home in the Bronx." The New York Times, Sunday, December 3, 1989.
- Fernandez, Enrique. "La Gran Passion: Work by Hispanic Photographers." The Village Voice, July 12, 1983.
- Guzman, Pablo Yoruba . "A Latin Sense of Family." The Daily News, September 30, 1979.
- Moser, Lida. "A Photographer's Guide to Cooperative Galleries." Arts & Leisure section, New York Times, October 17, 1976.
