= Botsis =

Botsis (Greek: Μπότσης) is a Greek surname. It can refer to:

- Botsis family of publishers, owners of the Greek newspaper Apogevmatini
- Ivan Botsis (died 1714), Greek-born Russian admiral

== See also ==
- Votsis
