= Orla Guerin =

Irish journalist and news presenter

Orla Guerin MBE
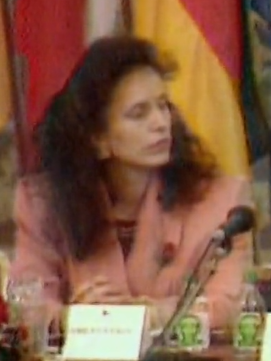
- Guerin in 1994
- Born: 15 May 1966 (age 60); Dublin, Ireland
- Education: Dublin Institute of Technology; University College Dublin
- Occupations: Journalist, presenter
- Notable credit(s): BBC News, RTÉ News
- Awards: Jacob's Award

Orla Guerin MBE (/ˈɡɛərɪn/ GAIR-in; born 15 May 1966) is an Irish journalist. She is a Senior International correspondent working for BBC News broadcasting around the world and across the UK.

== Early life and career ==
Guerin was born in Dublin and attended a convent school. A journalism graduate from the Dublin Institute of Technology (DIT), she qualified in 1985 with a Certificate in Journalism from the College of Commerce in Dublin. She also holds a master's degree in film studies from University College Dublin (UCD).

Guerin began her career working for newspapers in Dublin such as the Sunday Tribune before joining RTÉ News in 1987 and becoming its youngest foreign correspondent when she was sent to Eastern Europe at the age of 23 in 1990. She remained at RTÉ until 1994, additionally reporting from central Europe, the former Soviet Union and the former Yugoslavia. Guerin's reports from eastern Europe for RTÉ Radio won her a Jacob's Award in 1992.

She left RTÉ to run as an Irish Labour Party candidate in the 1994 European Parliament elections. A political novice, Guerin had been hand-picked by then Labour Party leader Dick Spring. Even though she was not selected at the party convention, Spring insisted that she be added to the ballot. She did not win a seat, polling seventh of 15 candidates with 6% of the vote.

== BBC career ==
Guerin joined the BBC in 1995. She was based in Los Angeles from January 1996 and became the corporation's Southern Europe correspondent in July 1996 and was based in Rome until June 2000. During this period, Guerin reported from Kosovo, the Republic of Macedonia and the Basque Country in northern Spain. In the second half of 2000, Guerin was based in Moscow, and covered the Kursk submarine disaster in 2000.

Regularly reporting from war zones, in 2002 Guerin told Evening Standard contributor Quentin Letts about having to wear appropriate clothing:

I got my first flak jacket from the Irish Army but they did not give me the armour plates that you slip into the vest. Without them the jacket was about as much use as a white handkerchief. I'm a bit more knowledgeable now and luckily the armour plates have become lighter. You cannot run very fast with a flak jacket on but sometimes you have to wear one. I have known colleagues who have died without them.

Guerin was appointed the BBC's Jerusalem correspondent in January 2001. At the beginning of April 2002, the BBC made an official complaint to the Israeli government after Israeli soldiers fired in the direction of Guerin and her team, forcing them to find cover, while they were recording a peaceful demonstration in Bethlehem in the West Bank. Almost two years later, the Israeli government wrote to the BBC accusing her of a "deep-seated bias against Israel" in a report on a teenage would-be suicide bomber. The BBC defended Guerin's reporting. Caroline Hawley succeeded her as the BBC's correspondent in Jerusalem. In December 2005, the BBC told Broadcast magazine that Guerin had spent two years longer in the Jerusalem posting than the normal three-year rotation usual for its correspondents. Former Director-General of the BBC Greg Dyke wrote: "I have no doubt that the decision by the BBC to pull their Middle East correspondent Orla Guerin out of the region and send her to South Africa was part of the normal rotation of BBC news correspondents around the world. However, it was pretty bad timing to announce it within days of Director General Mark Thompson's visit to Israel where he had a meeting with the Israeli Prime Minister Ariel Sharon". In January 2006 she became the BBC's Africa correspondent, based in Johannesburg. After this, Guerin was the BBC's correspondent based in Islamabad, Pakistan.

In October 2015, former BBC chairman Michael Grade wrote to James Harding, the Head of BBC News, criticising Guerin's Middle East reporting. In the letter, which was published in The Jewish Chronicle, Grade faulted her reporting for assuming "equivalence" between Israel and the Palestinians. According to Grade: "it was improper of the correspondent to claim that 'there's no sign of involvement by militant groups', before immediately showing footage of Palestinian Islamic Jihad (PIJ) banners at the home of a 19-year-old terrorist who carried out a deadly knife attack at Lion's Gate in Jerusalem on October 3".

On 23 February 2018, Guerin published an investigative report titled "The shadow over Egypt", where she reported the alleged forced disappearance of Egyptian nationals, including a young woman called Zubeida who, her mother claimed, had been kidnapped by security forces in April 2017. On 26 February 2018, a live interview was broadcast on Egyptian ON TV network, where Zubeida and her husband were interviewed by Amr Adib, a prominent pro-regime reporter. The interview revealed that Zubeida had been estranged from her mother since April 2017, had married and had had a baby just two weeks prior to the BBC report. However, on 27 February 2018, Zubeida's mother stated in a live phone-in interview with the Istanbul-based opposition Mekameleen TV station that she stood by all her previous claims and implied that Zubeida had been under duress to perform the interview. On 28 February 2018, reports emerged that Zubeida's mother had been arrested by the Egyptian security forces.

In 2019, Guerin was the BBC correspondent in Caracas, the Venezuelan capital, during the 2019 Venezuelan presidential crisis and protests.

In January 2020, Guerin's reporting from the Yad Vashem Center in Jerusalem on the 75th anniversary of the liberation of Auschwitz caused controversy, being criticised for appearing to link the Israeli–Palestinian conflict to the Holocaust. Over footage of Israeli troops visiting the center, she said: "The state of Israel is now a regional power. For decades, it has occupied Palestinian territories. But some here will always see their nation through the prism of persecution and survival." She was accused of antisemitism, and of inserting her personal bias against Israel into the Holocaust Memorial ceremony, without relevance to what the report was about. The Campaign Against Antisemitism made a complaint to the BBC and threatened to make a report to Ofcom.

As of 2023, she is currently based in Kyiv, where she reports on the 2022 Russian invasion of Ukraine.

== Honours and awards ==
In 2002, Guerin won the Broadcaster of the Year award from the London Press Club. In 2003, she was awarded the News and Factual Award by Women in Film and Television UK.

She was appointed MBE (Honorary) for services to broadcasting in 2005.

=== Honorary degrees ===
In 2002, Guerin was awarded an honorary degree from the University of Essex. In 2009, she was awarded honorary degrees from both of Northern Ireland's universities, Queen's University Belfast and the University of Ulster. In 2014, she was awarded an honorary degree by the University of Bradford. In November 2019, Guerin was awarded an honorary degree by NUI Galway. In December 2024, Guerin was awarded an Honorary Doctorate in University College Dublin.

== Personal life ==
Guerin married Reuters correspondent Michael Georgy in 2003.
