= Photographie.com =

Photographie.com is the oldest French photography online magazine. The subscription-free magazine includes all genres of photography and contains exhibition and photo book reviews, essays, analysis and criticism about photography and culture. It also provides video interviews with photographers, curators and other photography experts.

== History and profile ==
Photographie.com was created in 1996 by Jean-François Bauret, Yan Morvan and Didier de Faÿs to advance the interests of photographers. In 1998 Photographie.com launched the Bourse du Talent photography competition which awards prizes to young photographers in four different categories: reportage, portrait, fashion and landscape. The work of the prize winners is exhibited at the Bibliothèque nationale de France every year.
