= Recherche (newspaper) =

French language Greek newspaper

- Type: Newspaper
- Founded: 1898
- Political alignment: People's Party
- Language: French
- City: Chania
- Country: Greece

Recherche ('Research') was a French-language daily newspaper published in Greece. The newspaper was founded in 1898. As of 1937, its director was Antoine Bortolis, and its editor was Jean Bortolis. It served as the organ of the People's Party in the Chania region.
