= Researcher (disambiguation) =

A researcher is a person engaged in conducting research.

It may also refer to:

- Researcher (horse), a racehorse
- NOAAS Researcher (R 103), an American oceanographic research vessel

== See also ==
- Research (disambiguation)
