= Greenpeace Magazin =

Bimonthly environmental magazine in Germany

- Logo of Greenpeace Magazin
- Categories: Environmental magazine
- Frequency: Bi-monthly
- Founded: 1996
- Company: Greenpeace Media GmbH
- Country: Germany
- Based in: Hamburg
- Language: German
- Website: Greenpeace Magazin
- ISSN: 1611-3462

Greenpeace Magazin is an environmentalist and political magazine based in Hamburg, Germany. It is not affiliated with the Greenpeace organization.

== History and profile ==
The magazine was started in 1996 with the name Greenpeace Nachrichten. It is owned by Greenpeace Media GmbH and is headquartered in Hamburg. The publisher is Greenpeace Umweltschutzverlag GmbH. It is published on a bi-monthly basis. It was formerly published quarterly. The magazine is printed on 100% recycled paper.

The magazine covers the topics of environment, politics and the economy. It also features interviews with company executives and politicians. The other topics covered include environment protection in everyday life, environmental innovations and alternatives.
