= Emma-Jane Kirby =

British journalist, author and media producer

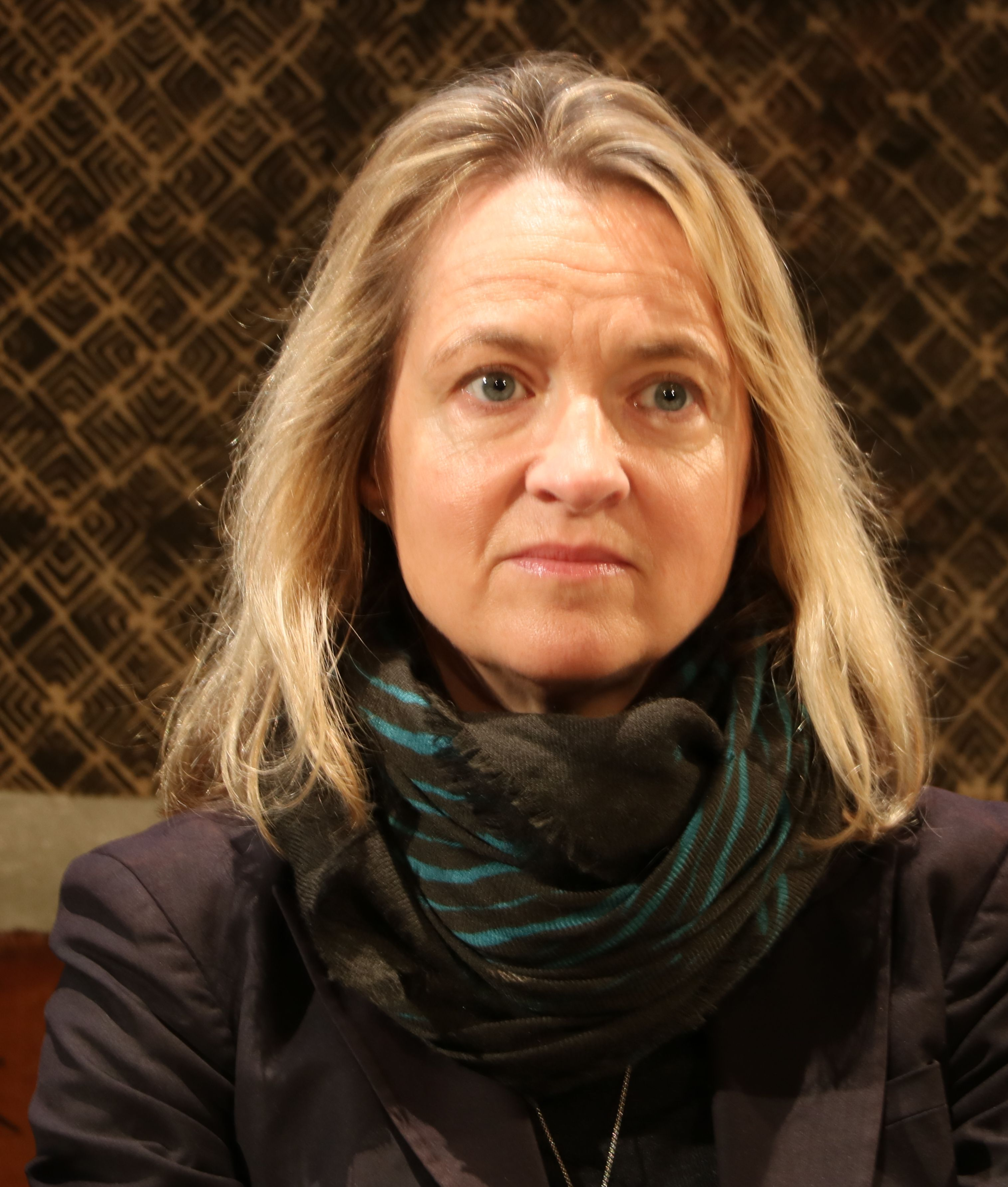
Kirby in 2017

Emma-Jane Kirby (born July 1970) is a British journalist, author and podcast producer.

== Background ==
Kirby was born in July 1970. She attended Chelmsford County High School for Girls from 1981 until 1988. She studied English at St Edmund Hall, Oxford University, graduating in 1993.

== Career ==
Kirby worked for the BBC for almost 30 years, joining the corporation after finishing her university education in 1993 by carrying out work experience at BBC Radio Oxford. She worked for three years as a researcher and then a reporter within BBC Local Radio. She then worked as a producer at BBC Radio 5 Live for two years. Following this, she worked at Woman's Hour as a reporter. Around the year 2000, Kirby presented documentaries on BBC Radio 4 and reported for BBC World. From 2001 she was UN and Geneva correspondent for the BBC. She was then Europe correspondent for the corporation, before being Paris correspondent for three years until 2010. For very many years until 2021, Kirby was a frequent contributor to the BBC programme From Our Own Correspondent. As of the mid-2010s, she reported from a variety of locations for the BBC.

In 2015, Kirby received a prize at the 2015 Bayeux-Calvados war journalism awards in France for her reporting on the migrant crisis in the Mediterranean Sea. On the 29th of September 2016, Kirby's book The Optician of Lampedusa was published. It tells the true story of an optician living on the island of Lampedusa, which was one of the parts of Europe at which migrants from Africa very commonly arrived, who rescued 47 migrants from a sinking ship with his friends. The book was shortlisted for the 2016 Waterstones Book of the Year award. By October 2017, the book had been translated into six languages. Kirby had initially told the story on BBC Radio 4, following which there was much interest in the story.

As of 2017, Kirby was a reporter for the BBC Radio 4 programmes Broadcasting House, PM and the World at One. Around the year 2020, Kirby produced a long series of reports for the World at One on BBC Radio 4 about the challenges faced by a particular school in inner Birmingham. In late 2022, Kirby left the BBC and joined an independent podcast company, Blanchard House. Kirby has been heavily involved in the making of podcasts by the company. Starting in March 2024, a true crime series produced and written by Kirby about the mystery surrounding the death of a King of Bulgaria, The Butterfly King, was gradually released; Exactly Right Media was also involved in the making of the series. In 2025, another audio series which Kirby was heavily involved in was released.

Kirby has also worked as a writer for The Archers.
