= Research (disambiguation) =

Research is a systematic work to create new knowledge or devise new applications of knowledge. However, colloquially it could also refer more specifically to studying currently available knowledge to increase one's own stock of knowledge.

Research may also refer to:

== Places ==
- Research, Victoria, a suburb of Melbourne, Victoria, Australia
- Research Range, a mountain range at the northern end of the Ural Mountains

== Ships ==
- Research (1861 ship), a ship launched at Yarmouth, Nova Scotia
- HCS Research (1823), a vessel that the British East India Company employed for exploration

== Other uses ==
- Research (finance), a type of financial analysis on companies for investment purposes
- Research (horse) (foaled 1985), an Australian Thoroughbred racehorse
- "Research" (song), by Big Sean (2015)
- RE/Search, an American magazine and book publisher
- The Research, a 2000s English indie pop band

== See also ==
Types of research

- Animal testing
- Applied research
- Basic research
- Human subject research
- Market research
- Medical research
- Psychological research
- Research and development
- Scientific research, investigation of phenomena or acquisition of knowledge using scientific methods
- Translational research

Other

- Epistemology
- Hermeneutics
- Search (disambiguation)
