= Patrick Chauvel =

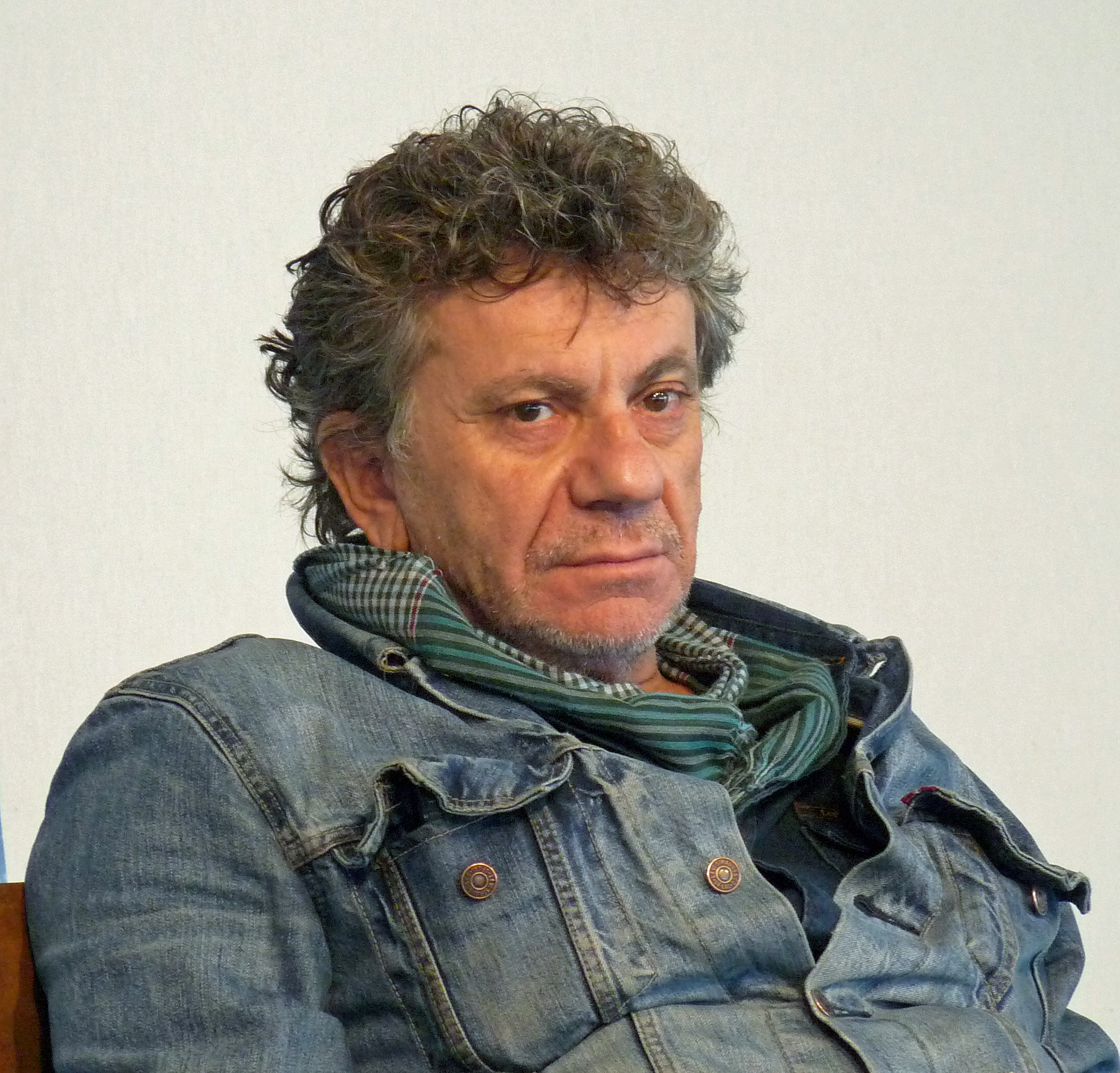

Patrick Chauvel (born 1949 in France) is an independent war photographer whose career began when he was just 17 years old.

He has covered more than twenty conflicts all over the world, including the Six-Day War and the Vietnam War. In 1995 he was awarded the World Press Photo commendation for Spot News Stories for his coverage of the Battle of Grozny during the First Chechen War.

He is also author of some documentary movies.

On 21 December 1989 during the Invasion of Panama he was critically wounded to the belly by two rounds shot by Marines; Juan Antonio Rodriguez (El Pais) was killed.

After the death of Diana, Princess of Wales, he allegedly saw time stamped photographs from a speed camera showing the Mercedes entering the fatal tunnel.

Author of two books in French, the autobiographical Rapporteur de Guerre (2003) and the novel Sky (2005).

Also participated in 24h.com-neo media projects and in the Condition One project.

== Documentary Films ==
- 48h à Ramallah / Patrick Chauvel
- Cauchemars d’enfants tchétchènes / Patrick Chauvel
- Derrière l’objectif / Patrick Chauvel
- Kamikaze 47 / Patrick Chauvel
- Rapporteurs de guerres / Patrick Chauvel; Antoine Novat

== Publications ==
- Chauvel, Patrick (2003). Rapporteur de guerre [War Reporter] (in French). France: Oh. p. 295. ISBN 978-2-915056-04-4.
- Chauvel, Patrick (2006). Sky (Novel) (in French). France: A Vue d'Oeil. p. 423. ISBN 978-2-84666-258-1.

== Filmography (actor) ==
- 1982 : L'Honneur d'un capitaine, by Pierre Schoendoerffer
- 1992 : Dien Bien Phu, by Pierre Schoendoerffer
- 2004 : Le Petit Lieutenant, by Xavier Beauvois
- 2004 : Above the Clouds (Là-haut, un roi au-dessus des nuages), by Pierre Schoendoerffer
- 2007 : L'étoile du soldat, by Christophe de Ponfilly
