= Triennial of Photography =

The Triennial of Photography (Triennale der Photographie) is a festival of photography in and around Hamburg, Germany. Originated as an initiative of photographer and collector F. C. Gundlach, the Triennale takes place every third year with major Hamburg museums, exhibition spaces, and cultural institutions.

== History ==
The festival was initiated in 1999 by Gundlach and has been organized every three years since then; since 2014, it has been organized by Deichtorhallen Hamburg GmbH. The 9th Triennial ran from 5 June to 22 September 2026, with eleven exhibitions at eight Hamburg partner institutions under the theme Alliance, Infinity, Love – in the Face of the Other.

The 4th Triennial of Photography Hamburg took place from the 11th to the 20th of April 2008. The 5th Triennial of Photography, Hamburg came up with numerous events at the festival tent and at five partaking cinemas from March 31 to April 6, 2011.
