= Greenpeace Foundation =

Greenpeace Foundation is an environmental organization based in Hawaii. It was officially founded in 1976 as an independent offshoot of the Canadian Greenpeace Foundation and is the oldest 'Greenpeace' in the United States. When the original Vancouver-based Greenpeace Foundation agreed in 1979 to be represented in Greenpeace International the Hawaii-based Greenpeace Foundation joined them, but a schism in 1985 over wildlife campaign goals and fundraising ethics caused Greenpeace Foundation to withdraw, and it remains an unaffiliated organisation doing business nationally and internationally.

According to Greenpeace Foundation's 1979-2023 leader, DJ White, the Hawaii group bought and fielded the world's first fully owned anti-whaling ship, created and conducted the international dolphin-saving campaign, created and coordinated the worldwide "driftnet" and "dolphin deadly tuna" campaigns, as well as bringing the ship Rainbow Warrior into the Pacific in 1983, for whale, dolphin, and other campaigns. It has impacted public education, influenced legislation without lobbying, and was active on press public relations, yet paid its members "virtually nothing in the way of salaries". Cut off from the large-scale fundraising of the Greenpeace 'empire' which controls all other 'Greenpeace' entities, the organization seeks to represent the original values of the Greenpeace movement.

== Greenpeace Foundation (Vancouver) ==
The Greenpeace movement grew out of the "peace" and "environmental" movements in the early 1970s. Back then, it looked likely that the planet was going to be subjected to a nuclear war. The Canadian "Don't Make a Wave" committee formed to protest US tectonic nuclear testing at Amchitka in the Aleutian Islands and later the French atmospheric testing at Mururoa in French Polynesia. The phrase "green peace" was used as a slogan to describe the ideals of those activists, who envisioned a healthy (green) and peaceful (peace) planet as a good thing. By about 1973, the phrase had been shortened to a word, Greenpeace, and an organization called "Greenpeace Foundation" was established in Vancouver, Canada. It was this ragtag group of idealists and visionaries who first did an at-sea protest of whaling in 1975 and conducted the high-profile campaign against the clubbing of baby harp seals off Newfoundland beginning in 1976.
