= List of photojournalists =

This is a list of photojournalists.

== List of photojournalists by country ==
- Australia
- United States
- Canada

== Others ==
- Arko Datta (1969–)
- Mayank Austen Soofi
- Eddie Adams (1933–2004)
- Lynsey Addario (1973–)
- Timothy Allen (1971–)
- Ali Hassan al-Jaber (1955–2011)
- Stephen Alvarez (1965–)
- Mohamed Amin (1943–1996)
- Loay Ayyoub (1993/1994–)
- Motaz Azaiza (1999–)
- Pablo Bartholomew (1955–)
- Felice Beato (1825–1903)
- Fatemeh Behboudi (1985–)
- Joshua Benoliel (1873–1932)
- Daniel Berehulak (1975–)
- Marcus Bleasdale (1968–)
- Walter Bosshard (photojournalist) (1892–1975)
- Margaret Bourke-White (1904–1971)
- Jane Bown (1925–2014)
- Mathew Brady (1823–1896)
- Esther Bubley (1921–1998)
- Dan Budnik (1933–2020)
- Romano Cagnoni (1935–2018)
- Robert Capa (1913–1954)
- Gilles Caron (1939–1970)
- Marion Carpenter (1920–2002)
- Kevin Carter (1960–1994)
- Henri Cartier-Bresson (1908–2004)
- Dickey Chapelle (1919–1965)
- Don Hogan Charles (1938–2017)
- Dieu-Nalio Chery (1981–)
- Filip Claus (1957–)
- Martha Cooper (1943–)
- Joseph Costa (1904–1988)
- Marie-Laure de Decker (1947–2023)
- Manoocher Deghati (1954–)
- Françoise Demulder (1947–2008)
- Yan Dobronosov
- Lucas Dolega (1978–2011)
- Sergio Dorantes (1946–)
- David Douglas Duncan (1916–2018)
- Thomas Dworzak (1972–)
- Clifton C. Edom (1907–1991)
- Jacob Elbaz (1945–)
- Dan Eldon (1970–1993)
- Samar Abu Elouf (1983/1984–)
- Walker Evans (1903–1975)
- Timothy Fadek (1969–)
- Alixandra Fazzina (1974-)
- Najlah Feanny (1961–)
- Roger Fenton (1819–1869)
- Jim Fenwick (1934–2021)
- Jockel Finck (1962–2006)
- Rowe Findley (1925–2003)
- Kevin Frayer (1973–)
- Shiho Fukada (1953–)
- Emily Garthwaite (1993–)
- Cédric Gerbehaye (1977–)
- Chas Gerretsen (1943–)
- Jan Grarup (1968–)
- Lauren Greenfield (1966–)
- Annie Griffiths (1953–)
- Ken Griffiths (1945–2014)
- Lu Guang (1961–)
- Carol Guzy (1956–)
- Anton Hammerl (1969–2011)
- Fatima Hassouna (1999–2025)
- Samar Hazboun (1985–)
- Tim Hetherington (1970–2011)
- Stuart Heydinger (1927–2019)
- Chris Hondros (1970–2011)
- Bunyo Ishikawa (1938–)
- Ferzat Jarban (?–2011)
- Chris Johns (1951–)
- Ed Kashi (1957–)
- André Kertész (1894–1985)
- William Klein (photographer) (1928–)
- Russell Klika (1960–)
- Gary Knight (1964–)
- Shisei Kuwabara (1936–)
- Vincent Laforet (1975–)
- Camille Lepage (1988–2014)
- Catherine Leroy (1944–2006)
- Alex Levac (1944–)
- Rick Loomis (1969–)
- Stefan Lorant (1901–1997)
- Paul Lowe (1963–2024)
- Kurt Lubinski (1899–1955)
- Danny Lyon (1942–)
- Greg Marinovich (1962–)
- Spider Martin (1939–2003)
- Enrico Martino (1960–)
- Don McCullin (1935–)
- Steve McCurry (1950–)
- Joseph McKeown (1925–2007)
- Susan Meiselas (1948–)
- Hansel Mieth (1909–1998)
- Lee Miller (1907–1977)
- Zoriah Miller (1976–)
- Ozier Muhammad (1950–)
- Maggie Murray (born 1942)
- James Nachtwey (1948–)
- Kenji Nagai (1957–2007)
- Ahmad Nateghi (born 1958)
- Antonio Olmos (1963–)
- Ken Oosterbroek (1962–1994)
- Burhan Ozbilici
- Tim Page (1944–2022)
- Gordon Parks (1912–2006)
- Martin Parr (1952–)
- Lucian Perkins (1953–)
- Tom Stoddart (1953 – 17 November 2021)
- Conrad Poirier (1912–1968)
- Fabio Polenghi (1962–2010)
- Dith Pran (1942–2008)
- Altaf Qadri (1976–)
- Gérard Rancinan (1953–)
- Ryan Spencer Reed (1979–)
- Fredrik Renander (1980–)
- Dezső Révai (1903–1996)
- Reza (1952–)
- Eugene Richards (1944–)
- Robert Riger (1924–1995)
- Manuel Rivera-Ortiz (1968–)
- James Robertson (1813–1888)
- Grace Robertson (1930–2021)
- Ruth Robertson (1905–1998)
- Patrick Rohr (1968–)
- Arthur Rothstein (1915–1985)
- David Rubinger (1924–2017)
- Didier Ruef (1961–)
- Sumy Sadurni (1989–2022)
- Sebastião Salgado (1944–)
- Erich Salomon (1886–1944)
- Luis Carlos Santiago (1989–2010)
- Mike Schennum
- Lawrence Schiller (1936–)
- Ignác Šechtl (1840–1911)
- Josef Jindřich Šechtl (1877–1954)
- Smita Sharma
- Danish Siddiqui (1983–2021)
- Ragnar Th. Sigurdsson (1958–)
- João Silva (1966–)
- Gary Mark Smith (1956–)
- W. Eugene Smith (1918–1978)
- Sally Soames (1937–2019)
- Pete Souza (1954–)
- Chris Steele-Perkins (1947–)
- Lisl Steiner (1927–)
- Dana Stone (1939–1970)
- Gerda Taro (1910–1937)
- Sebastiano Tomada (1986–)
- Stanley Tretick (1921–1999)
- David C. Turnley (1955–)
- Peter Turnley (1955–)
- Julia Tutwiler (1841–1916)
- Nick Ut (1951–)
- Franck Vogel (1977–)
- Homai Vyarawalla (1913–2012)
- Jeff Widener (1956–)
- Kamran Yusuf (Kamran Yousuf) (1994–)
- Hocine Zaourar (1952–)
- Rija Randrianasolo (1973–)
- Patrick Zachmann (1955–)
- Mustafa Seven (1974–)
- Mohammed Elshamy (1994–)

== See also ==
- List of photographers
- List of street photographers
- List of photographs considered the most important
