= List of Australian photojournalists =

This is a list of notable Australian photojournalists. For photojournalists of other nationalities, see list of photojournalists.

== Australian photojournalists ==
- David Adams (born 1963), photojournalist and documentary film maker
- Narelle Autio (born 1969), photographer
- Patrick Brown (born 1969), photographer
- Daniel Berehulak (born 1975), photographer, photojournalist
- Ernest Gustav Brandon-Cremer (1895–1957)
- Jeff Carter (1928–2010), photographer, author
- Michael Coyne (born 1945)
- Neil Davis (1934–1985), photojournalist, cameraman, on combat
- John Everingham (born 1949), journalist
- Jim Fenwick (1934–2021), photographer, photojournalist
- Ashley Gilbertson (born 1978), photographer, on war
- John Raymond Garrett (born 1940), journalist, on fashion
- Kate Geraghty (born 1972), photographer, photojournalist
- Frank Hurley (1885–1962), photographer, on expeditions
- Lyn Hancock, photographer, author, photojournalist, on wildlife
- Sam Hood (1872–1953), photographer, photojournalist
- Paul B. Kidd (1945–2021), photojournalist, radio host, author
- Damien Parer (1912–1944), photographer, on war
- Trent Parke (born 1971), photographer
- Willie Phua (born 1928)
- Francis Reiss (1927–2017), photographer
- Steven Siewert (born 1964), photographer, photojournalist
- Tracey Shelton, journalist
- Inger Vandyke, photojournalist, on wildlife

== See also ==
- List of photojournalists (Dynamic list by country of origin)
- Lists of journalists
- List of photographers
- National Press Photographers Association
