= List of German photojournalists =

This is a list of notable German photojournalists. For photojournalists of other nationalities, see list of photojournalists.

- Erich Andres
- Katharina Behrend
- Lucas Dolega
- Thomas Dworzak
- Frauke Eigen
- Alfred Eisenstaedt
- Horst Faas
- Jockel Finck
- Herbert Gauls
- Lisel Haas
- Heinz Hajek-Halke
- Erich Hartmann
- Roswitha Hecke
- Louis Held
- Hans Hildenbrand
- Max Hofmann
- Kurt Hutton
- Alex Kempkens
- Robert Lebeck
- Hans G. Lehmann
- Felix H. Man
- Josephine Meckseper
- Reiner Merkel
- Hansel Mieth
- Anja Niedringhaus
- Francis Reiss
- Günter Rössler
- Erich Salomon
- Hans-Joachim Spremberg
- Gerda Taro
- Kai Wiedenhöfer (1966–2024)
- Ingmar Zahorsky

== See also ==
- List of photojournalists (dynamic list by country of origin)
- Lists of journalists
- List of photographers
- National Press Photographers Association
