= Mika Yamamoto =

Japanese journalist (1967–2012)

- 山本 美香
- Born: Mika Yamamoto; 26 May 1967; Tsuru, Yamanashi, Japan
- Died: 20 August 2012 (aged 45); Aleppo, Syria
- Cause of death: Shot by pro-government assailant; Killed by government shelling
- Resting place: Tsuru
- Education: Tsuru University
- Occupation: Journalist
- Years active: 1990–2012

Mika Yamamoto (山本 美香, Yamamoto Mika) (26 May 1967 – 20 August 2012) was a Japanese video and photojournalist for the news agency Japan Press. Yamamoto was killed on 20 August 2012 while covering the Syrian Civil War in Aleppo, Syria. She was the first Japanese and fourth foreign journalist killed in the Syrian Civil War that began in March 2011. She was the fifteenth journalist killed in Syria in 2012. Yamamoto was a recipient of the Vaughn-Uyeda Memorial Prize of the Japanese Newspaper Publishers and Editors Association for her reporting of international affairs in 2004.

== Family background ==
Yamamoto was born in Tsuru, a city in Yamanashi Prefecture, on 26 May 1967. She had two sisters, and her father, Koji Yamamoto, is a former Asahi Shimbun reporter. She graduated from Tsuru University.

== Career in journalism ==
Yamamoto began her career in 1990 as a reporter for Asahi Newstar, the satellite television channel of TV Asahi, eventually becoming a video journalist and director for documentaries and news programs. She left the channel in 1995 to join the Japan Press, a Tokyo-based independent media group, which covers news and produces documentaries for TV broadcasting and magazines focused on the Middle East and Southwest Asia. Known for employing hand-held video cameras and performing her own editing, Yamamoto served as a correspondent for the Japan Press in critical areas such as Kosovo, Bosnia, Chechnya, Indonesia, Afghanistan in 2001, Iraq in 2003 and Uganda. She reported on the suppression of the Afghan women in Kabul and interviewed Taliban members in Afghanistan. She worked as a special correspondent for Nippon TV in Iraq. She survived a coalition tank shell strike on the Palestine Hotel in Baghdad on 3 April 2003 where two journalists from Reuters and a Spanish broadcaster were killed. Yamamoto transitioned to work as a news presenter for the Nippon TV news program Today by NNN (「NNNきょうの出来事」, NNN Kyo no Dekigoto) in 2003 and 2004, receiving the Vaughn-Uyeda Memorial Award Prize for her previous coverage of the war in Iraq. She was also a special lecturer at Waseda University's journalism school and at her alma mater, Tsuru University. Her lectures were concerned with the effects of war on ordinary citizens and the role of journalism during wartime. After the Great East Japan earthquake on 11 March 2011, Yamamoto visited the affected areas to record the damage experienced. In November 2011, she began to serve as an independent consultant to the Government Revitalization Unit with the responsibility for reducing unnecessary spending in the Japanese government. Yamamoto was on assignment in Syria for Nippon TV to cover the civil war and the impact it had on the Syrian civilian population when she was killed.

== Death ==
Aleppo, the city where Mika Yamamoto was killed on 20 August 2012

Yamamoto and her Japanese colleague and boyfriend, photographer Kazutaka Sato, were travelling with fighters of the Free Syrian Army when they came under attack in Aleppo. She was seriously wounded in the Suleiman al Halabi district of the city during a clash between Syrian opposition and pro-government forces on 20 August 2012; Sato stated that Yamamoto's death occurred when pro-government troops appeared and started "random shooting". She died at a nearby hospital after suffering gunshot wounds to the neck while a rebel fighter gave a conflicting account that she was killed during shelling by the pro-government forces. Masaru Sato, a spokesman with the foreign ministry in Tokyo, confirmed her death on 20 August 2012.

Autopsy revealed that Yamamoto suffered trauma caused by gunshot wounds to her neck and torso despite her use of body armor and that the primary cause of her death was internal bleeding and rapid blood loss. It was further revealed by the autopsy that she had been shot nine times and that the cause of her death was a bullet to the neck, damaging her spinal cord.

Her body was delivered by the members of the Liwa Asifat al Shamal, one of the groups attached to the Free Syrian Army, to Japanese consular officials in Kilis, southern Turkey, at 1:00 pm on 21 August 2012.

== Funeral ==
Yamamoto's body was taken from Kilis to Istanbul on 23 August 2012. Her two sisters and nephew travelled to Istanbul and accompanied her body back to Japan on 25 August. Her funeral ceremony, attended by some 800 people, was held in Tsuru, where her parents live, on 27 August.

== Reactions ==
The executive director of the Committee to Protect Journalists, Joel Simon, expressed his sorrow and sent his condolences to Yamamoto's family and friends. On 22 August, the Japanese Foreign Minister Kōichirō Gemba stated that the killing of Yamamoto was very unfortunate and he offered his condolences to her family. The French Foreign Ministry released a statement of condolence at a press briefing on 21 August for Yamamoto's family and those involved in the tragedy. United States Department of State spokesperson Victoria Nuland at a press briefing on 21 August condemned the killing of Yamamoto by Syrian government forces and issued a statement of condolence.

== Memorials ==
On 10 October 2012, the students at Waseda University where Yamamoto had lectured for four years organized a memorial service for her. The ceremony included a movie about her, and also her friends' statements.

== See also ==
- List of journalists killed during the Syrian Civil War
- List of photojournalists
