= Jawan Mohammed Qatna =

Murdered Syrian Kurdish photographer

Jawad Mohammed Qatna
- Died: 26 March 2012; Derbassiyeh
- Cause of death: Torture and Murder
- Known for: Photography

Jawan Mohammed Qatna was a Syrian Kurdish photographer, journalist and activist who was murdered on 26 March 2012. He died aged 22, and was later buried in his birthplace of Tel Kadish. Qatna was known for reporting on and taking pictures of Kurdish rallies and demonstrations in Eastern Syria, providing numerous media organisations with these photographs. The identities of the four men who perpetrated this murder are still up for contention. When Qatna's body was discovered, it was stated that he "bore signs of torture".

== Life ==
Qatna was an amateur photographer for the Free Derbassiyeh Coordination Committee, and regularly covered protests in Derbassiyeh, in the East of Syria. He most frequently covered pro-Kurdish rallies in this region, focussing primarily on youth movements. He would often provide images that he took to media outlets who were unable to gain access to the area. His photographs proved helpful in highlighting the scale of the protests in Derbassiyeh. Derbassiyeh is in the North East of Syria - an area many Kurdish people regard as their anscestral homeland.

== Murder ==
Qatna was kidnapped from his home by four masked men on 26 March 2012. He was subsequently taken elsewhere before he was likely tortured and then eventually murdered. The body was discovered three hours later. It is still uncertain as to who planned and perpetrated this murder, however some assert that it was possibly the pro-Assad Shabbab militia; no concrete evidence of this being the case has been forthcoming. In the same week, two British journalists, Naseem Intiri and Waled Bledi were killed in Syria which overshadowed the media coverage of Qatna's murder. However, the organisation Reporters Without Borders shone light on this tragedy, strongly condemning his murder and stating that those who bring to the fore information about demonstrations and civil unrest should not fear for their lives. Qatna was buried by friends at his place of birth Tel Kadish.
