= Hervé Ghesquière =

French journalist (1963–2017)

- Born: February 5, 1963
- Died: June 14, 2017 (aged 54)
- Occupation: Journalist

Hervé Ghesquière (February 5, 1963 – June 14, 2017) was a French journalist most famous for being held hostage in Afghanistan by the Taliban for 547 days along with fellow reporter, Stéphane Taponier and their driver. They were released to French authorities June 29, 2011.

== Capture ==
In 2012, Ghesquière published his account of his capture. He called the press corps liaison officer, Lt. Colonel Fouquereau a coward for refusing to arrange a personal interview with a member of the Taliban. Ghesquière claimed that he was only captured because he wanted to interview Taliban members and it would not have happened if the French military had organized a meeting. Fouquereau won the resulting defamation suit.

An article in L'express summarized the biography, pointing out that Ghesquière did not believe it would be dangerous to simply travel to a Taliban stronghold which he chose to do, without any security escort, on his own initiative.

Yves Debay, senior war correspondent, wrote a scathing condemnation of Ghesquière. In it he uses several derogatory terms to describe Ghesquière's intelligence. The French Government never publicly disclosed the details of the exchange but points out that the original demands were the release of 17 Taliban officers and 20 million euros.
