= Basil al-Sayed =

- Born: ca. 1987; Syria
- Died: December 27, 2011; Baba Amr (neighborhood), Homs, Syria
- Cause of death: Gunshot wound to the head
- Occupation: Freelance citizen journalist
- Known for: Capturing footage of the Syrian civil war that many others were unable to get.
- Relatives: Rami Al-Sayed

Basil al-Sayed (Arabic: باسل السيد; ca. 1987 – 27 December 2011) of Homs, was a Syrian citizen journalist and videographer working in Homs, Syria during the Syrian civil war and was well known by the news media for his reporting under dangerous conditions and at a time when international media were banned. He was called "The revolution's journalist" by the people of Homs.

According to the Committee to Protect Journalists, he was the second journalist to be killed during the Syrian uprising. Ferzat Jarban, the first journalist to be killed, was a freelance television camera operator. Basil al-Sayed was the first citizen journalist to be killed. At the time, foreign journalists were banned from Syria by the Bashar al-Assad government.

== Personal ==
Basil Al-Sayed was born to an Alawite family in Syria in 1987. He was a resident of Homs, Syria where he documented the Syrian civil war. He had a brother and a sister and he was the youngest sibling of the three.

== Career ==
Basil al-Sayad was working as a citizen journalist when he was killed in Homs at the age of 24. He had previously worked as a carpenter. Around the time of his death, al-Sayed was employed at an aluminum factory. He spent his time outside of his job exposing the Syrian government and documenting the civil war. Like many other citizen journalists, he would then post the videos to the internet for the world to witness. Al-Sayed recorded the uprising using a red Samsung video camera. He loaded footage to the YouTube videosharing web site and news organizations around the world incorporated his video into their news. It was also known that al-Sayed spent some of his time helping others. He used his carpentry skills to help repair damaged homes and he delivered food on his motorcycle to families in need.

== Death ==
Homs is in Syria and shown relative to the capital Damascus.

Basil al-Sayed died sometime around 27 December 2011. He was shot in the head while trying to capture video of security forces firing at protesters. It was reported that al-Sayed was reporting things many people could not get by being in very dangerous circumstances and this is what ultimately led to his death. He was capturing video at the moment he was shot and killed.

== Context ==
In March 2011, the Syrian civil war began. During this time, Syrian officials banned international journalists from their country. This prompted a rise in citizen journalist to document and publish the civil war and turmoil that was occurring. Basil al-Sayed was among that group of citizen journalist. He set himself apart by becoming a videographer and putting himself in dangerous situations. He also was known for interviewing Syrians about the state of political and economic turmoil the country was facing. At the time of his death, the conflict between the government and the opposition had been going on for 10 months.

== Impact ==
Foreign journalist had been mostly banned in Syria. The only way the world is able to witness the crisis unfolding in Syria, is via the videos uploaded to YouTube captured by citizen journalists. Basil al-Sayed is one among a long list of Syrian citizen journalist murdered. His brave work along that of other citizen journalists, has allowed the world to witness the Syrian crisis between president Bashar al-Assad's regime and the rebels. He was the second Syrian journalist killed. The first was Ferzat Jarban, who was also killed in Homs around November 20, 2011. Since al-Sayed and Jarban, it has been reported that 61 more citizen journalists have lost their lives while trying to document the uprising. Included in those deaths, was Rami al-Sayed, who was Basil al-Sayed's cousin, and h was killed only two months after his cousin. al-Sayed, along with others, set the foot work for future citizen journalist to capture the civil war.

== Reactions ==
Basil al-Sayed was considered to be a local hero by some and his death saddened and outraged many. He set out to document the Syrian civil war and expose it to the world by uploading hundreds of hours of footage via YouTube. According to a prominent Syrian activist, Rami Jarrah, among thousand of Syrian citizen journalists al-Sayed was one that stood out. Jarrah told NPR news about the dangerous conditions under which he worked: "He was documenting stuff that no one could actually get hold of. I don’t want to say this was expected, but he was always in those situations where you could expect something would happen to him." He was filming when he was shot and his final minutes were caught on camera. This footage caused grief to many that admired him and followed his work. A video was also uploaded to YouTube by an activist, showing al-Sayed's mother and relatives weeping and grieving over his dead body. The international journalist community condemned al-Sayed's intentional murder.

== See also ==
- List of journalists killed during the Syrian civil war
- Siege of Homs
