= Michael Coyne =

Michael Coyne may refer to:

- Michael L. Coyne, dean of the Massachusetts School of Law
- Michael Coyne (photographer), Australian photojournalist
