= Sadurni =

Sadurni or Sadurní is a surname. Notable people with the surname include:

- Salvador Sadurní (born 1941), Spanish footballer
- Sumy Sadurni (1989–2022), Spanish-Mexican photographer
