= Muhammed Muheisen =

Jordanian photographer

- Born: 1981 (age 44–45)
- Occupations: Photographer,Artist, Influencer
- Known for: Documentary Photography, Public Speaking, Photojournalism, Educating, Humanitarian Aid
- Website: muhammedmuheisen.com

Muhammed Muheisen (born 1981) is a two-time Pulitzer Prize winning photographer and the recipient of numerous international awards. He is a National Geographic photographer and the founder of the Dutch non-profit organization Everyday Refugees Foundation.

== Biography and career ==
Muheisen was born and raised in Jerusalem and graduated with a B.A. degree in journalism and political science. Since 2001 he has documented major events around the world, in Asia, the Middle East, Europe, Africa and the United States of America: including the Israeli-Palestinian conflict, the funeral of late Palestinian leader Yasser Arafat, the US led -war in Iraq, the capture of former Iraqi president Saddam Hussein, the Yemeni revolution, the Syrian Civil War, the funeral procession of the late president Nelson Mandela, as well as major events in Saudi Arabia, China, Afghanistan, Pakistan, Egypt, Jordan, France, Greece, Macedonia, Germany, Croatia, Austria, the Netherlands, Serbia and South Africa. For over a decade he has been documenting the refugee crisis across the Middle East, Asia and Europe.

== Awards ==
Muheisen has received numerous International Awards, including:

· UNICEF Picture of the Year.

· Two-time Breaking News Pulitzer Prize winner.

· TIME Magazine’s Best Wire Photographer.

· Emerging Person in Photography Special Award by the Hamdan bin Mohammed bin Rashid Al Maktoum International Photography Award

· POYI, Picture of the Year International.

· Multiple prizes in the National Headliner Awards.

· Multiple prizes in the NPPA Best of Photojournalism.

· Multiple prizes in the Atlanta Photojournalism Seminar.

· Multiple prizes in Asian Media Awards, best in photojournalism.

· The Oliver S. Gramling Award for journalism.

· The John L. Dougherty Award.

· Festival Du Scoop Award.

· Multiple Awards in the China International Press Photo Contest.

· Sigma Delta Chi Awards.

· Multiple Prizes in Xposure International Photography Festival Award.

· Multiple prizes in: the APME News Photos Award.

· The MCF Engaged Journalist Award.

· World Press Photo Joop Swart Master Class participant.

Muheisen is the Founder and Chairman of Everyday Refugees Foundation that aims through photography to help and empower refugees and internally displaced people in different parts of the world. He is a member of the Anja Niedringhaus Courage in Photojournalism Award advisory committee at the International Women Media Foundation, a member of the nominating committee selecting the participants for the annual World Press Photo Joop Swart Master Class, a member of the advisory board of Forum Anja Niedringhaus in Höxter, Germany and a member of the Artist Advisory Board for the CASE Art Fund based in Illinois, US.

Muheisen served as a jury member in the 2016 Picture of the Year International in Columbia, MO, the 2015 World Press Photo Joop Swart Masterclass in Amsterdam, the Netherlands, the 2013 Visa D’Or for Visa pour L’Image in Perpignan, France, the 2017 LensCulture Emerging Talent Awards, and most recently he is a member of the jury for the 2019 FotoEvidence Book Award with World Press Photo.

Among other exhibitions, a collection from a decade of his work about “Life in War” was exhibited in the French photo festival Visa pour L’Image in Perpignan.

His work about refugees was exhibited at Festival des Libertes in Brussels, Belgium, his work about the displaced people was exhibited at THE FENCE in Brooklyn, Atlanta, Boston and Houston, USA, also a selection of his work “Pursuit of Happiness” was exhibited at the Angkor Photo Festival, and for the second year in a row, his work “Victims of War” and “Faces of Sharjah” was exhibited at Xposure International Photography Festival in Sharjah, UAE. And most recently in October 2018 he launched his photo exhibition “Light on the Move” at the Museum of Cycladic Art in Athens, Greece which will be touring Europe in 2019.
