= Ibrahim Al-Omar =

Syrian journalist (1978–2016)

- Born: ca. 1978; Syria
- Died: July 11, 2016 (aged 38); Northern Syrian Town of Tarmanin, Idlib, Syria
- Cause of death: A Russian air raid
- Citizenship: Syrian
- Occupation: Camera Operator
- Employer: Al-Jazeera Mubasher live feed news channel operated by Qatar-based Al-Jazeera.

Ibrahim Al-Omar (ca. 1978 – July 11, 2016), was a Syrian journalist and camera operator for Al Jazeera in Idlib, Syria, who was killed during the Syrian Civil War.

== Personal ==
Ibrahim Al-Omar was born around 1978 in the suburbs of Aleppo in Syria.

== Career ==
He worked as a journalist for Al Jazeera Mubasher news network.

== Death ==
Idlib is located in Syria and is shown relative to Syria's largest city Aleppo and its capital city Damascus.

Ibrahim Al-Omar died while covering a Russian airstrike in a northwestern city called Tarmmanin north of Idlib, Syria. The area was attacked by missiles fired from Russian aircraft. Al-Omar was covering the aftermath of the Russian airstrike when another one hit his location and killed him. As a result of the same Russian mission, two others were killed south of Idlib in Ihsem, while another five were killed elsewhere in the providence.

== Context ==
The Syrian Civil War is an armed conflict between Bashar al-Assad and the opposition in Syria. At that moment, Russia was involved in the conflict in partnership with the Bashar al-Assad regime. The Russian air attacks had been an ongoing operation.

== Impact ==
Syrian citizens have been reporting what was happening on the ground during the war as the situation became dangerous. Ibrahim Al-Omar was one of the few who have actually been hired by a news channel. Another Syrian reporter working for Al Jazeera, Zakaria Ibrahim, was killed one year before him in Homs. At the time, six Al Jazeera journalists had been killed during the Syrian Civil War.

== Reactions ==
Reporters Without Borders reacted to his death in the following statement: "We deplore the unacceptable conditions in which media personnel continue to work in Syria and which often result in their deaths... Journalists are targeted, harassed and killed while just covering events. We firmly condemn the indiscriminate air strikes bombardments that kill many civilians every day and often include journalists among the victims."

Irina Bokova, director-general of UNESCO, said, "The civilian status of journalists in conflict situations must be respected and their lives protected, in keeping with the Geneva Conventions."

== See also ==
- List of journalists killed during the Syrian Civil War
