= Paula Bronstein =

American photojournalist

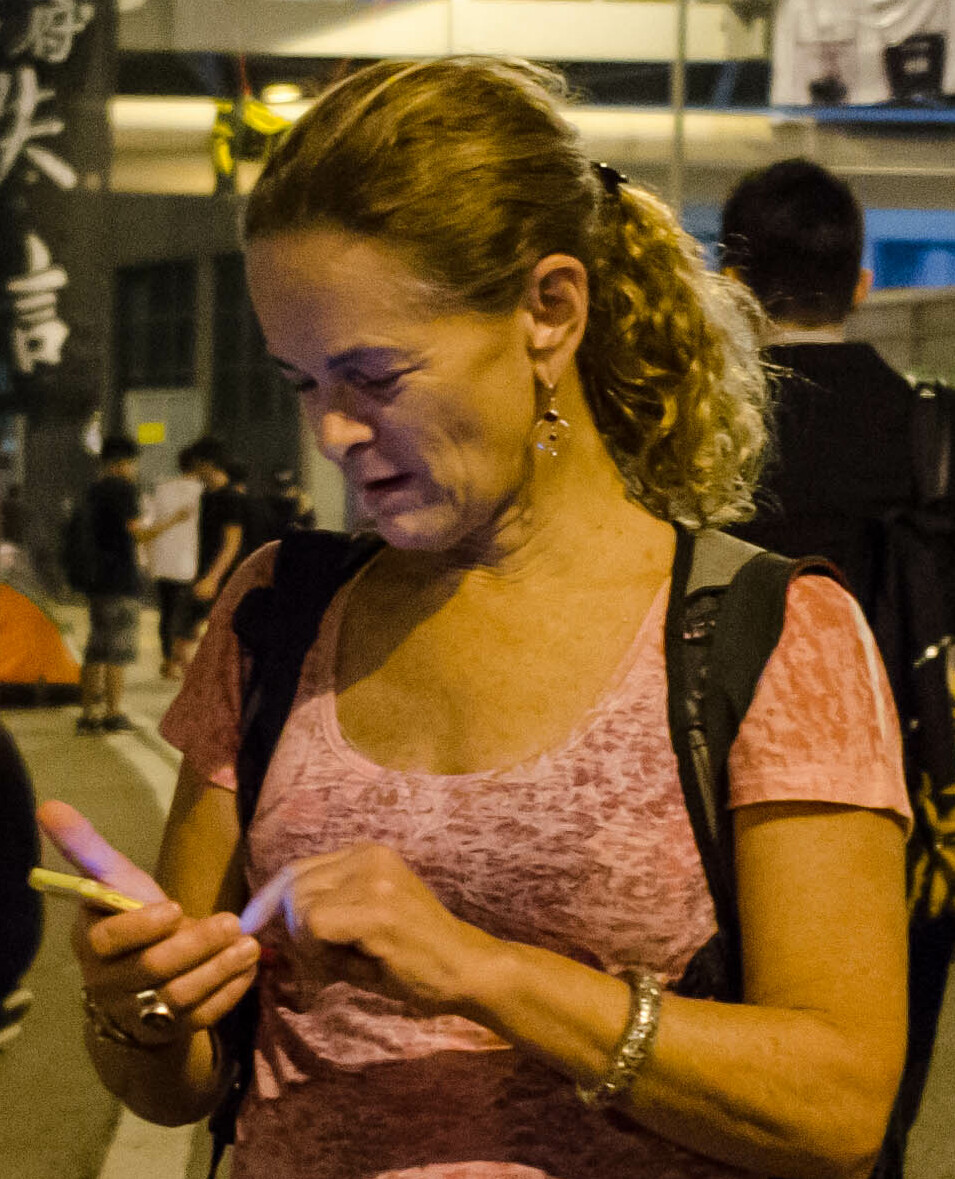
Bronstein in 2014

Paula Bronstein is an American photojournalist who entered the profession in 1982 in Providence, Rhode Island. She is now based in Bangkok where she works for Getty Images. Bronstein was a nominated finalist for the Breaking News 2011 Pulitzer Prize.

Her book, Afghanistan Between Hope and Fear, was published by University of Texas Press in 2016.

== Biography ==
Bronstein majored in photography at the University of Colorado and at Austria's Salzburg College before specializing in photojournalism at the Rochester Institute of Technology where she graduated in fine arts. She embarked on her career in the United States at the Providence Journal Bulletin before spending 12 years with the New Haven Register and the Hartford Courant. In 1996, she became a staff photographer at the Chicago Tribune and then worked for The Register-Guard in Oregon.

Since 1998, Bronstein has been based in Bangkok. In June 2002, she joined Getty Images where she has covered conflicts and news stories throughout the wider Asian region including Kashmir, Afghanistan, Indonesia and Pakistan.

Bronstein's camera lens was smashed and she suffered minor bruising when New South Wales Police pushed her to the ground while she was photographing protesters of the APEC Australia 2007 meetings. Bronstein called for an inquiry into the police actions.

She was arrested by police during the 2014 Hong Kong protests on suspicion of criminal damage due to climbing on top of a private vehicle to take photos of the clashes in Mong Kok on the evening of 17 October. Police stated that a complaint against her was made by the car's driver, who was inside it, and took action to remove her when she refused to get down. Bronstein claimed to be shocked by her arrest, saying it was common practice for photojournalists to stand on cars to avoid crowds in war zones. Bronstein was released the next day after posting bail of 300 Hong Kong Dollars (US$38.70).

== Publication by Bronstein ==
- Afghanistan Between Hope and Fear. Louann Atkins Temple Women & Culture Series. Austin, TX: University of Texas Press, 2016. ISBN 978-1477309391. With a foreword by Kim Barker, an essay by Christina Lamb ("Afghan Women"), and an afterword by Bronstein.

== Awards ==
- John Faber award from the Overseas Press Club.
- 2006: First prize, China's International Press Photo contest (CHIPP) for "Earthquake victims in Kashmir".
- 2010: Runner-up, Photojournalist of the Year (large markets), National Press Photographers Association, for her photograph of heroin addicts in Kabul.
- 2010: Photographer of the year 2010, Foreign Correspondents Club of Thailand, for her coverage of the Thai political crisis.
- 2011: FotoEvidence Book Award for her work on "Afghanistan: Between Life and War".
- 2011: Nominated Finalist together with Daniel Berehulak for the Breaking News Pulitzer Prize.
- 2017: Daily Life, first prize singles, World Press Photo.
