= Loay Ayyoub =

Palestinian photojournalist (born 1990s)

- لؤي أيوب
- Born: 1994 or 1995 (age 30–31); Gaza, Palestine
- Education: Al-Azhar University – Gaza
- Occupation: Photojournalist
- Awards: Impact Award; 2023 James Foley Award for Conflict Reporting; 2024 Rémi Ochlik Visa d'Or Award; 2024

Loay Ayyoub (Arabic: لؤي أيوب; born 1993 or 1994) is a Palestinian photojournalist. He studied at Al-Azhar University – Gaza and has worked as a freelance photographer for The Washington Post.

== Early life and education ==
Ayyoub was born in Gaza. Ayyoub studied Media, Journalism and Public Relations at Al-Azhar University – Gaza, and graduated in 2017.

== Career ==
Ayyoub works as a freelancer and in 2019 began his photojournalism career with The Washington Post. His work documents day-to-day life in Gaza. Following the outbreak of the Gaza war on 7 October 2023, Ayyoub began reporting on the conflict. He separated from his family to keep them safe; Reporters Without Borders reported that by September 2024, over 130 journalists had been killed in Gaza. Ayyoub evacuated from Gaza City, travelling south through the Gaza Strip, before leaving for Egypt in March 2024.

For his reporting on the Gaza war, Ayyoub won the Impact Award at the 2023 Lucie Awards and the James Foley Award for Conflict Reporting in the 2024 Online Journalism Awards. Ayyoub won second prize in the Young Reporter Trophy at the 2024 Bayeux Calvados-Normandy Award for war correspondents. Ayyoub's photos were exhibited at the Visa pour l'Image photojournalism festival in France in 2024; the exhibition was titled "La tragédie de Gaza" (“The Tragedy of Gaza”). Ayyoub won the festival's Rémi Ochlik Visa d'Or Award. Jean-François Leroy curated the festival and commented that "the [Gaza Strip] is completely sealed off, completely closed to the international press, so we're only working with Gazan photographers – of whom there are very few".

== Awards and honours ==
- 2023 – Impact Award, Lucie Awards
- 2024 – Second prize, Young Reporter Trophy, Bayeux Calvados-Normandy Award for war correspondents.
- 2024 – James Foley Award for Conflict Reporting, Online Journalism Awards
- 2024 – Rémi Ochlik Visa d'Or Award, Visa pour l'Image

== See also ==
- History of Palestinian journalism
- Photography in Palestine
