= Maya Nasser =

Syrian journalist and reporter

- مايا ناصر
- Born: 30 July 1979; Syria
- Died: 26 September 2012 (aged 33); Damascus, Syria
- Cause of death: Sniper shot
- Education: Kaplan University
- Employer: Press TV
- Known for: Reports from Aleppo and rest of Syria during the Syrian Civil War

Maya Nasser (Arabic: مايا ناصر; 30 July 1979 – 26 September 2012) was a Syrian journalist and reporter who worked for Press TV, an Iranian English-language broadcasting service. Nasser reported from Syria during the Syrian Civil War. His reports from Aleppo are the most notable. Nasser also reported from the United States, Lebanon, Jordan, Egypt, and Bahrain.

On 26 September 2012, Nasser was covering the large explosions at the Syrian army's headquarters in Umayyad Square when he was killed by a rebel sniper. Nasser was shot through the neck and was killed. Hussein Murtada, Press TV's Damascus bureau chief and head of the Arabic-language al-Alam TV network, was wounded in a leg. Nasser is the 46th journalist killed during the Syrian Civil War.

== See also ==
- List of journalists killed during the Syrian Civil War
