= Patryk Jaracz =

Polish documentary photographer

Patryk Jaracz (born 1990) is a Polish documentary photographer and visual journalist focused on human rights issues. He has been continuously covering the war in Ukraine since January 2022. His work has been recognised with multiple international awards, including the 2023 UNICEF Photo of the Year. In August 2020, Patryk was arrested and tortured at Okrestina 36 detention centre while covering election protests in Minsk, Belarus.

== Awards ==
- Unicef Photo of the Year 2023
- The Prix de la Photographie Paris: Press Photographer of the Year 2024
- Grand winner of The International Photography Award 2024
- Single shot winner at Festival della Fotografia Etica: World Report Award
- Documentary Photography 2024 at Sarajevo Photography Festival
- Photojournalism Award at Xposure Photography Festival
