= List of journalists killed during the Syrian civil war =

Important cities in the Syrian Civil War where journalists have been killed.

The journalists killed during the Syrian Civil War refers to the foreign war correspondents, Syrian professional journalists (including those who work for pro-government media outlets), and Syrian citizen journalists (including those who work for opposition forces) killed since the beginning of the civil war in 2011 and who have died as a result of their reporting. Also included in a separate form are those journalists whose whereabouts are unknown or whose disappearance is a result of their reporting and the period of their disappearance, including those cases where it is unknown as to whether or not they are casualties.

The Doha Centre for Media Freedom has documented 110 professional or citizen journalists who have died during the Syrian civil war. The Syrian Journalists' Association has documented 153 journalists killed since the uprising and throughout the civil war, and 15 in March 2013. As of March 2013, the United Nations estimated that 70,000 people have been killed during the Syrian civil war.

== Professional or citizen journalists/media activists killed in Syria ==
Date	Name	Location	Notes	Refs
19 December 2024	Cihan Bilgin	Aleppo Governorate, near the Tishrin Dam	Free media workers Cihan Bilgin and Nazım Daştan were Killed in an unmanned combat aerial vehicle (UCAV) attack carried out by the Turkish state on the road between the Tishrin Dam and the town of Sirin.	
19 December 2024	Nazım Daştan	Aleppo Governorate, near the Tishrin Dam	Free media workers Cihan Bilgin and Nazım Daştan were Killed in an unmanned combat aerial vehicle (UCAV) attack carried out by the Turkish state on the road between the Tishrin Dam and the town of Sirin.	
9 August 2023	Firas al-Ahmad	al-Shayyiah, Deraa Governorate	journalist working for Sama TV in Damascus. Killed along with three soldiers by a roadside bomb that also injured his cameraman	
20 February 2020	Abdul Nasser Haj Hamdan	Maaret Elnaasan	photographer working for the Media Office in Binnish, died in Russian airstrike	
10 February 2020	Abdul Hameed al-Yousef	Kafr Rumah, Idlib governorate	photographer and camera operator for Kafr Rumah Media Office, died in government shelling	
13 October 2019	Mohammed Hussein Rasho and Saad Ahmed	Ras al-Ain	Two Syrian Kurdish journalists in Turkish air strike on civilian convoy carrying local and foreign journalists	
12 November 2016	Mohsen Khazaei	Minyan district, Aleppo	Iranian reporter for IRIB and his cameraman injured in rebel crossfire while embedded with pro-government fighters	
23 October 2016	Eylül Nûhilat	Shehba	While accompanying fighters of Shehba Women Protection Front, the Syrian Kurdish YPJ press office journalist was killed during the artillery attacks of the Turkish army on Shehba region.	
13 October 2016	Patryk Skolak	Aleppo	Polish freelance journalist	
18 July 2016	Mustafa Mohammed	Manbij, Aleppo Governorate	The Syrian Kurdish journalist for Ronahi TV, died in Qamishli from injuries sustained while covering the fighting in Manbij	
11 July 2016	Ibrahim Al-Omar	Idlib	Syrian reporter for Al-Jazeera, killed in Russian double tap airstrike while reporting	
24 June 2016	Khaled Al-Issa	Aleppo (wounded in Syria and pronounced dead in Antakya, Turkey)	Opposition journalist killed by an explosive device hidden in his home. Known for being the fellow journalist of Hadi al-Abdullah, injured in the same attack	
7 December 2015	Zakaria Ibrahim	Teldo Village, Homs province	Al Jazeera camera operator	
31 January 2015	Kenji Goto	Unknown (ISIL)	Japanese freelance video journalist, captured and beheaded by ISIL	
25 September 2014	Unidentified member of Raqqa Is Being Slaughtered Silently	Raqqa	Name withheld for security reasons; death was officially reported on 25 September 2014	
10 September 2014	Mohamed Al Qasim	Idlib	Reporter for Syrian radio station Rozana, killed by unknown gunman while interviewing a rebel leader	
2 September 2014	Steven Joel Sotloff	Unknown (ISIL)	American freelance photographer	
19 August 2014	James Wright Foley	Unknown (ISIL)	American freelance photographer	
27 May 2013	Yara Abbas	Homs (Dabaa airport)	Reporter for Syrian News Channel (al-Ikhbariyah), killed by rebel sniper while reporting a clash	
1 April 2013	Abdul Raheem Kour Hassan	Damascus	Radio director for Watan FM	
15 March 2013	Ahmed Khaled Shehadeh	Damascus (Daraya)	Editor-in-chief at the newspaper Anab Balady	
10 March 2013	Ghaith Abd al-Jawad	Damascus	Citizen journalist working for the Qaboun Media Center	
10 March 2013	Amr Badir al-Deen Junaid (aka Abu Ameer)	Damascus	Citizen journalist working for the Qaboun Media Center	
3 March 2013	Walid Jamil Amira	Damascus	Citizen journalist working for the Jobar Media Center	
25 February 2013	Wael Abdul Aziz	Homs (Baba Amr)	Citizen journalist	
24 February 2013	Olivier Voisin	Idlib Governorate (wounded in Syria and died in Turkey)	French freelance photographer; injured near Idlib, died in Turkey	
19 February 2013	Adnan Abu Abdo	Daraa	Citizen journalist	
17 February 2013	Mohamed Mohamed	Damascus	Citizen journalist	
17 February 2013	Mohammed Saeed Al-Hamwi	Damascus (Qaboun)	Citizen journalist	
15 February 2013	Yousef Adel Bakri	Aleppo	Citizen journalist with the Aleppo News Network	
12 February 2013	Hamada Abdel-Salam Al-Khatib	Homs	Citizen journalist	
11 February 2013	Zaid Abu Obeida	Damascus	Citizen journalist	
6 February 2013	Mohammed Kurdi	Damascus	Citizen journalist	
3 February 2013	Abdul Latif Khalil Khuder	Damascus	Citizen journalist	
2 February 2013	Nabil Al-Nabulsi	Daraa Izra	Citizen journalist	
24 January 2013	Mohamed Abd Al-Rahman	Damascus	Sports journalist for pro-government news website Syria News	
18 January 2013	Mohammed al-Masalmeh, a.k.a. Mohamed al-Hourani	Basri Al-Hariri, Daraa Governorate	Al Jazeera TV reporter	
18 January 2013	Amjed Al-Sayoufi	Saqba (east of Damascus)	Citizen journalist	
18 January 2013	Hossein Al-Qadri	Saqba (east of Damascus)	Citizen journalist	
17 January 2013	Yves Debay	Aleppo	French-Belgian journalist for Assaut (French magazine)	
15 January 2013	Ahmed Assaad Al-Shahab	Homs	Citizen journalist who was executed in a beheading by Syrian forces	
13 January 2013	Bassem Fawaz Al-Za'bi	Tafas (near Deraa)	Citizen journalist	
4 January 2013	Suhail Mahmoud Al-Ali	Damascus or Aleppo	Addounia TV	
22 December 2012	Haidar Smoudi (also transliterated al-Sumudi)	Damascus	Syrian Arab News Agency (SANA)	
12 December 2012	Anmar Yassin Mohammad	Damascus (Mezzeh)	pro-gov Syrian News Center	
6 December 2012	Mohamed Khair Sheikh Qwaider	Arbin (east of Damascus)	Citizen journalist	
4 December 2012	Naji Assaad	Damascus (Tadamon)	Tishreen	
30 November 2012	Marwan Hamid Charbaji	Damascus (Daraya)	Citizen journalist	
29 November 2012	Mohammad Koraytem	Damascus (Daraya)	Citizen journalist	
25 November 2012	Mohamed al-Khal	Deir ez-Zor	Shaam News Network	
21 November 2012	Basel Tawfiq Yussif	Damascus (Tadamon)	Journalist for Syria's Public Authority for Radio and Television (Syrian state TV)	
20 November 2012	Huzan Abdul Halim Mahmoud	Al-Hasaka (Ras al-Ayn)	Citizen journalist	
19 November 2012	Mohammed Al-Zaheer Al-Naimi	Damasacus (Al-Bouaida)	Citizen journalist	
18 November 2012	Mohammed Al-Khalid	Aleppo	Media activist executed by the Free Syria Army	
17 November 2012	Abdullah Hassan Kaaka	Unknown	Citizen journalist tortured by the government	
16 November 2012	Mustafa Kerman	Aleppo	Citizen journalist	
5 November 2012	Samer Khrayshi	Arbin (east of Damascus)	Citizen journalist	
2 November 2012	Hassan Haidar Al Sheikh Hammoud	Homs	Citizen journalist	
1 November 2012	Mohammad Khalil Al-Wakaa	Deir ez-Zor	Citizen journalist	
23 October 2012	Anas Al-Ahmed	Unknown	Citizen journalist	
20 October 2012	Omar Abdul Razik Lattouf	Aleppo	Citizen journalist	
20 October 2012	Mohammed Jumaa Abdul Karim Lattouf	Aleppo	Citizen journalist	
10 October 2012	Mohammad Al-Ashram	Deir ez-Zor	Syrian News Channel (Al-Ikhbariyah TV)	
3 October 2012	Mona Bakkour	Aleppo (Saadallah Al-Jabri Square)	Thawra	
2 October 2012	Ahmed Ali Saada	Damascus	Citizen journalist and worked for the Syrian National Council	
27 September 2012	Mohamad Fayad Askar	Deir ez-Zor (Al Kousour)	Citizen journalist	
26 September 2012	Abdul Aziz Ragheb Al-Sheikh	Deir ez-Zor (Al Jabla)	Citizen journalist for Shaam News Network	
26 September 2012	Maya Nasser	Damascus	Press TV (Iran)	
19 September 2012	Abdul Kareem Al Okdah	Hama	Citizen journalist for Shaam News Network	
9 September 2012	Tamer Al-Awam	Aleppo	Freelance filmmaker	
6 September 2012	Anas Al-Abdullah	Damascus	Citizen journalist	
6 September 2012	Tahseen Al-Toum	Damascus	Citizen journalist	
6 September 2012	Nawaf Al-Hindi	Damascus	Citizen journalist	
4 September 2012	Mohamed Badeer Al-Qasim	Homs	Citizen journalist who started a media center in Deir ez-Zor	
22 August 2012	Omar Hamed al Zanil (also transliterated Omar Al Hamed Al-Zamel)	Al-Hirak, Izra' District, Daraa Governorate	Citizen journalist	
22 August 2012	Musab al-Odallah	Naher Aisha, Damascus	Tishreen	
20 August 2012	Mika Yamamoto	Aleppo	Japanese reporter for Japan Press	
11 August 2012	Ali Abbas	Jdaidet Artouz (town), southwest of Damascus	Journalist for SANA who was killed at his home	
11 August 2012	Bara'a Yusuf al-Bushi	Al-Tall	Citizen journalist	
10 August 2012	Hatem Abu Yehya	Al-Tall	Syrian News Channel (Al-Ikhbariyah TV)	
3 August 2012	Mohammed al-Saeed	Jdaidet Artouz, southwest of Damascus	SANA TV presenter who was kidnapped and executed	
3 August 2012	Ahmad Salam	Damascus	Citizen journalist	
3 August 2012	Zuhair Muhammed Al-Shaher	Deir ez-Zor	Citizen journalist	
22 July 2012	Mahmoud Sudqi	Idlib Governorate	Citizen journalist	
19 July 2012	Mohamed al-Husni	Al-Qusayr, Homs Governorate	Citizen journalist and director of the Media Centre in Al Qusour	
18 July 2012	Ali Juburi al-Kaabi	Damascus	Iraqi journalists working for Al Roaa (Iraq)	
18 July 2012	Falah Taha (Iraqi)	Damascus	Iraqi journalists working for Al Roaa (Iraq)	
12 July 2012	Ihsan al Buni (also transliterated Ihssan Al-Binni)	Damascus (Daraya)	Al-Thawra	
4 July 2012	Suhaib Dib	Damascus	Citizen journalist	
4 July 2012	Alaa Umar Jumaa	Kansaba	Citizen journalist	
2 July 2012	Mohamed Hamdo Hallaq	Azaz (near Aleppo)	Citizen journalist	
28 June 2012	Mohammed Ali Al Haymad	Damascus (Daraya)	Citizen journalist	
28 June 2012	Samer Khalil Al-Sataleh (Al-Salta), aka Abou Yasser	Damascus (Douma)	Citizen journalist	
27 June 2012	Mohammad Shamma	Damascus (Drousha)	Syrian News Channel (Al-Ikhbariyah TV)	
27 June 2012	Zaid Kahel	Damascus (Drousha)	Syrian News Channel (Al-Ikhbariyah TV)	
27 June 2012	Sami Abu Amin	Damascus (Drousha)	Syrian News Channel (Al-Ikhbariyah TV)	
26 June 2012	Wael Omar Barad	Jarjaraz	Citizen journalist	
25 June 2012	Ghias Khaled Al-Hmouria	Damascus (Douma)	Citizen journalist	
21 June 2012	Hamza Mahmoud Othman	Homs	Citizen journalist	
21 June 2012	Omar Al-Ghantawi	Homs	Citizen journalist	
16 June 2012	Ahmed Hamada	Homs (Baba Amr)	Citizen journalist	
15 June 2012	Bassim Barakat Darwish	Al-Rastan, Homs Governorate	Citizen journalist & founder of the Rastan Media Center	
13 June 2012	Ayham Youssef Al Hariri	Houran	Citizen journalist	
10 June 2012	Khaled Al-Bakir (Al-Bakr)	Al-Qusayr, Homs Governorate	Citizen journalist & founder of Alaasi Revolution News Network	
31 May 2012	Abdulhameed Idriss Matar	Al-Qusayr, Homs Governorate	Citizen journalist	
28 May 2012	Bassel Shehadeh	Homs	Citizen journalist	
28 May 2012	Ahmed Al Assam	Homs	Citizen journalist	
27 May 2012	Ammar Mohamed Zado (also transliterated Amar Mohamed Souheil Zada)	Damascus (Al-Midan)	director of Shaam News Network	
27 May 2012	Ahmed Adnan Al-Ashlaq	Damascus (Al-Midan)	Shaam News Network	
27 May 2012	Lawrence Fahmy Al-Naimi	Damascus (Al-Midan)	Shaam News Network	
17 May 2012	Hasan Azhari	Lattakia	Citizen journalist who was arrested, tortured, and killed in Damascus at The Military Security prison (Branch 215)	
4 May 2012	Abdul Ghani Kaakeh	Aleppo (Salah Al-Din)	Citizen journalist	
17 April 2012	Khaled Mahmoud Kabbisho	Idlib	Citizen journalist	
17 April 2012	Alaa al-Din Hassan al-Douri	Hama Governorate	Citizen journalist	
14 April 2012	Sameer Shalab al-Sham	Homs	Citizen journalist	
14 April 2012	Ahmed Abdollah Fakhriyeh	Dumeir (northeast of Damascus), Rif Dimashq Governorate	Citizen journalist	
6 April 2012	Anas Al-Houlani	Homs	Citizen journalist	
29 March 2012	Ahmed Mohamed Djibril	Idlib	Citizen journalist who was 17 years old at the time he was shot and killed	
26 March 2012	Walid Bledi	Darkush (near the Turkish border)	Algerian-British freelance journalist	
26 March 2012	Naseem Intriri	Darkush (near the Turkish border)	Algerian-French freelance journalist	
26 March 2012	Jawan Mohammed Qatna	Al-Hasakeh (Ad Darbasiyah)	Kidnapped (Kurdish) citizen journalist for Free Derbassiyeh Coordination Committee whose body was later discovered	
9 March 2012	Amr Kaaka	Doma (near Damascus)	Citizen journalist	
24 February 2012	Abdullah Khaled Awad	Al-Qusayr, Homs Governorate	Citizen journalist	
24 February 2012	Anas al-Tarsha	Homs (Qarabees)	Citizen journalist	
22 February 2012	Remi Ochlik	Homs	French freelance photographer for IP3 Press photo agency	
22 February 2012	Marie Colvin	Homs	American journalist working for The Sunday Times (UK)	
21 February 2012	Rami al-Sayed	Homs (Baba Amr)	Citizen journalist	
7 February 2012	Mazhar Tayyara (also transliterated Madhar Amr Tayara)	Homs	Freelance journalist for Agence France-Presse (France), The Guardian (UK), Die Welt (Germany)	
5 February 2012	Saleh Samih Murjan	Karm Zeitun (near Homs)	Citizen journalist	
27 January 2012	Usama Burhan Idriss	Homs (Inshaatt)	Citizen journalist	
11 January 2012	Gilles Jacquier	Homs	French citizen reporting for France 2	
2 January 2012	Shoukri Ahmed Ratib Abu Bourghoul (also transliterated Shukri Ratib Abu Burghol)	Damascus (Daraya)	al-Thawra (daily) and Radio Damas	
28 December 2011	Muawiya Ibrahim Ayoub	Al-Rastan, Homs Governorate	Citizen journalist	
27 December 2011	Muatassim Al-Saleh	Hama	Citizen journalist	
27 December 2011	Basil al-Sayed	Homs (Baba Amr)	Died in an improvised hospital from a gunshot wound suffered five days earlier (Known in Homs as "the revolution's journalist")	
21 December 2011	Rami Ismail Iqbal	a Syrian prison	Citizen journalist	
15 December 2011	Bilal Jibss	Idlib (Kafr Tkharam)	Citizen journalist	
15 December 2011	Hamza Khalid Amer	Shamseen (near Homs)	Citizen journalist	
6 December 2011	Firas Barshan	Homs	Citizen journalist	
26 November 2011	Nizar Adnan Humsa	Homs (Al Bayada)	Citizen journalist who died while in custody of the Syrian intelligence agency	
20 November 2011	Ferzat Jarban	Al-Qusayr, Homs Governorate	Freelance TV camera operator	
5 May 2011	Ahmed Souleymane Daheek	Talbiseh, Homs	Citizen journalist, shot	

== Professional or citizen journalists/media activists killed outside of Syria ==
Date	Name	Location	Notes	Refs
17 September 2012	Unknown journalist killed (Unknown nationality)	Arsal, Lebanon	Journalist killed by missiles fired from a Syrian jet.	
9 April 2012	Ali Shaaban	Wadi Khaled, Lebanon	Lebanese Camera operator for Al-Jadeed television.	

== Professional journalists who died from other circumstances ==
Date	Name	Location	Notes	Refs
16 February 2012	Anthony Shadid	Syrian-Turkish border	American award-winning New York Times reporter who died from an asthma attack while reporting in Syria.	

== Professional journalists and citizen journalists/media activists who were missing and then freed ==
Date	Name	Location	Notes	Refs
29 April – 18 May 2011	Dorothy Parvaz	Damascus	Al Jazeera. She carries Iranian, Canadian and U.S. passports. She was abducted by government forces, deported to Iran, and eventually released there.	
13 – 17 December 2012	Richard Engel	Ma’arrat Misrin	NBC TV. American TV reporter, producer, camera operator, and two crew were abducted after an ambush and held captive for 5 days until rebels freed the team from the group of Syrian loyalists known Shabiha.	
October 2015 – 16 September 2016	Janina Findeisen	Al-Dana	German freelance reporter for Süddeutsche Zeitung and NDR, traveled to Syria after an invitation from a friend, even though she was pregnant. She was abducted then released by Jabhat al-Nusra after a sharia court ruled her kidnapping un-Islamic.	
January 2017 – January 2020	Shiraaz Mohamed		South African photojournalist for the charity Gift of the Givers, freed after three years of abduction. Believed abducted by ISIL.	

== See also ==
- Syrian civil war
- Media of Syria
- Newspapers of Syria
- Pre-civil war and the role of media: Damascus Spring
- Human rights violations during the Syrian civil war
- Cities and towns during the Syrian civil war
- Siege of Homs
- 2011–2012 Damascus clashes
- 2011–2012 Daraa Governorate clashes
- 2011–2012 Idlib Governorate clashes
- Battle of Aleppo (2012)
