= UNICEF Photo of the Year =

German photography award

The UNICEF Photo of the Year Award is given by UNICEF Germany to photographs and photo series that “best depict the personality and living conditions of children worldwide in an outstanding manner”. Since 2000, the annual award has been given exclusively to professional photographers who have been recommended to UNICEF by internationally renowned photography experts. An independent jury selects the winner.

In December 2026, the prize was awarded ex aequo to two photographs for the first time. The winners were Avishag Shaar-Yashuv from Israel and Samar Abu Elouf from Palestine. Shaar-Yashuv portrayed children in a hotel who had survived the October 7 attacks, in 2023, including the winning picture of an eight-year-old boy, Stav. Abu Elouf, who works for the New York Times, portrayed the Palestinian siblings Darren (11 years old) and Kinan (5 years old) in a hospital in Qatar. Both were the only survivors of their family of Israeli air force bombings of residential areas in Gaza.

== Winners ==
- 2000: „Rwanda: Country of the lost children“; Photographer: Matias Costa
- 2001: „Costa Rica: Siviani on the Sofa“; Photographer: Meredith Davenport
- 2002: „Liberia/Sierra Leone: Forgotten Refugees of the World“; Photographer: Jan Grarup
- 2003: „Honduras: Bound to El Norte“; Photographer: Don Bartletti
- 2004: „Sudan: Darfur in flame“; Photographer: Marcus Blaesdale
- 2005: „Ukraine: Street children in Odessa“; Photographer: David Gillanders
- 2006: „Pakistan: The Kashmir Earthquake“; Photographer: Jan Grarup
- 2007: „Afghanistan: Child brides“; Photographer: Stephanie Sinclair
- 2008: „Haiti: Surviving in Haiti“; Photographer: Alice Smeets
- 2009: „Tanzania: Deadly superstition“; Photographer: Johan Bävman
- 2010: „Vietnam: The legacy of war“; Photographer: Ed Kashi
- 2011: „Ghana: Waste export to Africa“; Photographer: Kai Löffelbein
- 2012: „Syria: Children between the lines“; Photographer: Alessio Romenzi
- 2013: „Syria: Syria's “forgotten” child victims“; Photographer: Niclas Hammarström
- 2014: „Philippines: Wanna have love!?“; Photographer: Insa Hagemann, Stefan Finger
- 2015: „Greece/North Macedonia: Utter despair“; Photographer: Georgi Licovski
- 2016: „Iran: Defending the right to smile“; Photographer: Arez Ghaderi
- 2017: „Syria: The face of a tormented childhood“; Photographer: Muhammed Muheisen
- 2018: „Togo: Every child matters“; Photographer: Antonio Aragón Renuncio
- 2019: „Philippines: Garbage, the Children and Death“; Photographer: Hartmut Schwarzbach
- 2020: „Greece: The flames of misery“; Photographer: Angelos Tzortzinis
- 2021: „India: Drowned hopes“; Photographer: Supratim Bhattacharjee
- 2022: „Tigray, Ethiopia: Taking Refuge in Books“; Photographer: Eduardo Soteras
- 2023: „Ukraine: Under the dark clouds of war“; Photographer: Patryk Jaracz
- 2024: ex aequo
  - „Israel: The trauma of little Stav“; Photographer: Avishag Shaar-Yashuv
  - „Palestine: the drama of Dareen and Kinan (for The New York Times)“; Photographer: Samar Abu Elouf
- 2025:„Afghanistan: The Brave Struggle of Being a Girl“; Photographer: Elise Blanchard
