= Frauke Eigen =

German photographer, photojournalist and artist

Frauke Eigen (born 1969 in Aurich, West Germany) is a German photographer, photojournalist and artist.

== Early life ==
Eigen studied at the Royal College of Art in London.

== Kosovo war photographs ==
In 2000, while Eigen was working as a photo-journalist for a government relief organisation in Kosovo, she heard that mass graves were being exhumed, and went to see them. She saw the bodies of the people who had been killed in 'ethnic cleansing', and later on, their clothing and other belongings, which had been removed and washed. Eigen found the belongings more emotionally moving than the bodies, and decided to photograph them instead. These photographs became the basis for Fundstücke Kosovo (Kosovo Finds).

In 2011–12, Fundstücke Kosovo featured in Imperial War Museum London's Women War Artists exhibition. Kathleen Palmer, Head of Art at the Imperial War Museum, commented that:

"this focus upon their personal possessions brings to life the people who had been killed. Since the images themselves are not horrific and graphic, they allow the viewer to relate to the horror in a different way.... They allow us to engage with the horror more immediately."

Fundstücke Kosovo was later published as an edition of ten sets of fourteen photographs. One set was acquired by the Imperial War Museum, and another by the National Gallery of Canada.

Eigen's photographs were later used as evidence by the War Crimes Tribunal in The Hague.

== Other war photography ==
As of 2011, Eigen had recently completed a photographic project in Afghanistan.

== See also ==
- List of German photojournalists
- War crimes in the Kosovo War
