= Filip Claus =

Belgian photographer

- Born: March 17, 1957 (age 68); Aalst, Belgium
- Occupation: Photojournalist
- Years active: 1981–present
- Parent(s): Paul Claus; Anna Cordemans
- Website: www.filipclaus.be

Filip Claus (born March 17, 1957) is a Belgian photojournalist. He focuses on street photography and 'life reportage' style.

== Early life and De Morgen ==
Claus was born in Aalst, Belgium, the third of four children. His father Paul Claus was managing director of international cultural affairs and also inspector at the national center for youth. His mother Anna Cordemans was a progressive writer for the Katholieke Arbeidersvrouwen (Dutch for Catholic Workers Women). She died of cancer when Claus was 14 years old. Claus' grandfather (Marcel Cordemans) was the first editor-in-chief of the Flemish daily newspaper De Standaard (Dutch for The Standard). Pol Van den Abeele, the first photojournalist of De Standaard, was a close friend of the family, and introduced Claus to the world of photojournalism.

At age 18, Claus left school to travel and explore the world for several years. When he returned in 1980, he attended a photography course at the Royal Academy of Fine Arts in Ghent. Dissatisfied with the approach of some teachers, he left after half a year. In May 1981, he received his first assignment from the Socialist Flemish newspaper De Morgen (Dutch for The Morning). Claus spent almost three decades as a photojournalist on assignment for De Morgen. He specialised in Belgian politics and conflicts in Africa, the Middle-East and south eastern Europe. Claus documented the revolution in Romania in 1989, the AIDS problem in South Africa and the genocide in Rwanda. He also made portraits of Belgian politicians such as former Prime Ministers of Belgium Jean-Luc Dehaene and Guy Verhofstadt. His photographs, such as Ronse, are of ordinary daily life. In 2009 Claus won the Dexia Press Award for his outstanding contributions to photojournalism.

== Later career ==
Since 2009, he has worked as a freelance photographer for diverse media, aiming to use photography in the service of humanity. To this end he has collaborated on many human documentary projects.

Since 2009, he has worked with Belgian photographers (Yann Bertrand, Tim Dirven, Jimmy Kets, Jonas Lampens and Bob Van Mol) on the project Lijn 3, a social and human document of a specific neighbourhood, De Brugse Poort in Ghent, Belgium.

In 2010, an overview book of his work Een reisgids voor het land der blinden (Dutch for A guidebook for the country of the blind) was published by Ludion.

In 2011 and 2012, he documented the culture, traditions, religion, education and sport of the Flemish city and municipality of Aalst, resulting in the photo book Vlaanderen in Aalst (Dutch for Flanders in Aalst), published by Snoeck. This work shows a sequence of narrative Flemish images, captured with irony. This project was exhibited at the 't Gasthuys (Aalst) (Dutch for Municipal Museum) in 2013.

In 2013, Claus undertook the Cairopolis project. Together with 3 other Belgian photographers (Zaza Bertrand, Bieke Depoorter and Harry Gruyaert) he spent 8 weeks in Cairo, Egypt, photographing street scenes and the contrast between traditional craftsmen and the modern city. An exhibition was held and a book published with the resulting work.

== Publications ==
- Lijn 3 - Beelden & verhalen uit de stadsrand van Gent. Antwerp, Belgium: Ludion, 2010.
- Een reisgids voor het land der blinden. Antwerp, Belgium: Ludion, 2010.
- Vlaanderen in Aalst. Gent-Kortrijk: Snoeck, 2012.
- Cairopolis. Gent: Uitgeverij Snoeck, 2013.
