= Yves Debay =

French-Belgian war correspondent (1954–2013)

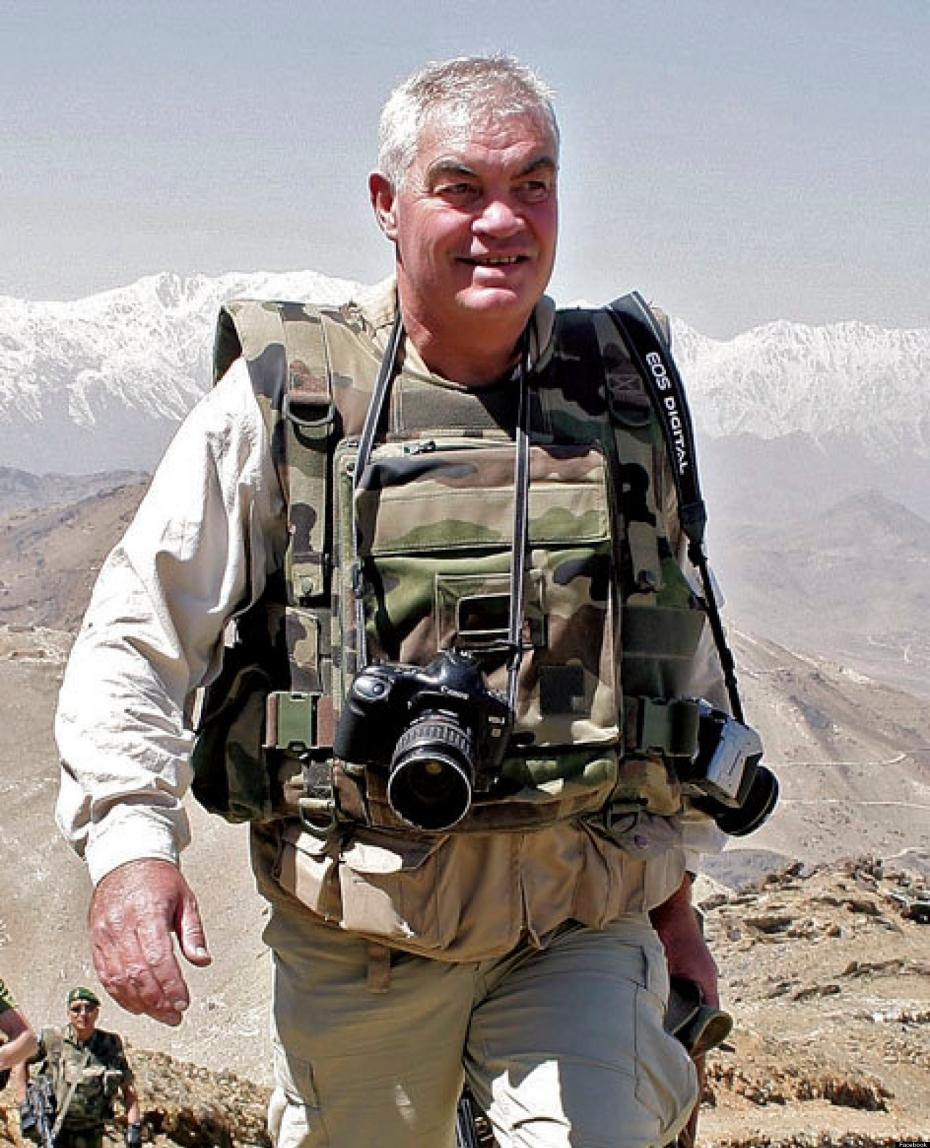
- Debay in Afghanistan in 2005
- Born: 24 December 1954; Élisabethville, Belgian Congo (modern-day Lubumbashi, Democratic Republic of the Congo)
- Died: 17 January 2013 (aged 58); Aleppo, Syria
- Cause of death: Sniper fire
- Occupations: Publisher, editor and journalist who specialized in military and war
- Years active: 1986-2013
- Organization(s): Assaut, Raids
- Known for: war reporting
- Website: www.assaut.fr/assaut.html

Yves Debay (24 December 1954 – 17 January 2013), was a veteran French-Belgian war correspondent, who founded and reported for the French-language magazines Raids and later Assaut ("Assault"), which is published out of Boulogne-Billancourt, Paris, France. He was the first Belgian journalist to be killed in Syria.

== Personal ==
Yves Debay was born in Élisabethville, Belgian Congo (later Lubumbashi, Democratic Republic of the Congo). He first enlisted in the Belgian army in 1975 and later was a tank commander before turning to mercenary activities. In 1987, he became a French citizen.

== Career ==
Yves Debay was a former soldier who later became a journalist specialising in military issues for war enthusiasts. In the late 1970s, Debay served in the Rhodesian Armoured Car Regiment during the Rhodesian Bush War, 44 Parachute Brigade in the South African army during the South African Border War and later had a career as a journalist writing for Gazette des Armes. Debay was one of the founders of Raids in 1986 and worked for the French-language magazine for over 20 years covering military and war issues. In 2005, he founded his own military magazine called Assaut, for which he served as publisher, editor and journalist. As a war correspondent, he covered wars in Afghanistan, both Iraq wars, Lebanon, the Balkans, Libya and Syria.

== Death ==
Aleppo and the capital, Damascus

Little is known about the circumstances in which Debay was killed. An anonymous source, described in the media as an activist, told the French news agency Agence France-Presse (AFP), ".. it seems like he entered a very dangerous street where the army and pro-regime militia were positioned" before he was killed by a sniper. The source claimed to have deposited his body in Bab al-Salama, a border checkpoint for Northern Syria and Turkey.

According to a preliminary autopsy report, Debay had been shot through the heart.

== Impact ==
Yves Debay and Marie Colvin were among the most experienced war correspondents who were killed while covering the Syrian civil war.

== Reactions ==
While a hostage situation was ongoing in Algiers after France's intervention in Mali, French President François Hollande issued an official statement condemning Debay's killing.

== Writings ==
- Wildcat, Carnets de guerre d'un journaliste rebelle (2004).

== See also ==
- List of journalists killed during the Syrian civil war
- Battle of Aleppo (2012–2013)
- Lord Richard Cecil
