= Photography in Palestine =

Photography has been used as an important medium to document the lives and culture of the Palestinian people. In the early history of photography, Palestine was one of the first places outside Europe to be photographed extensively.

== History ==
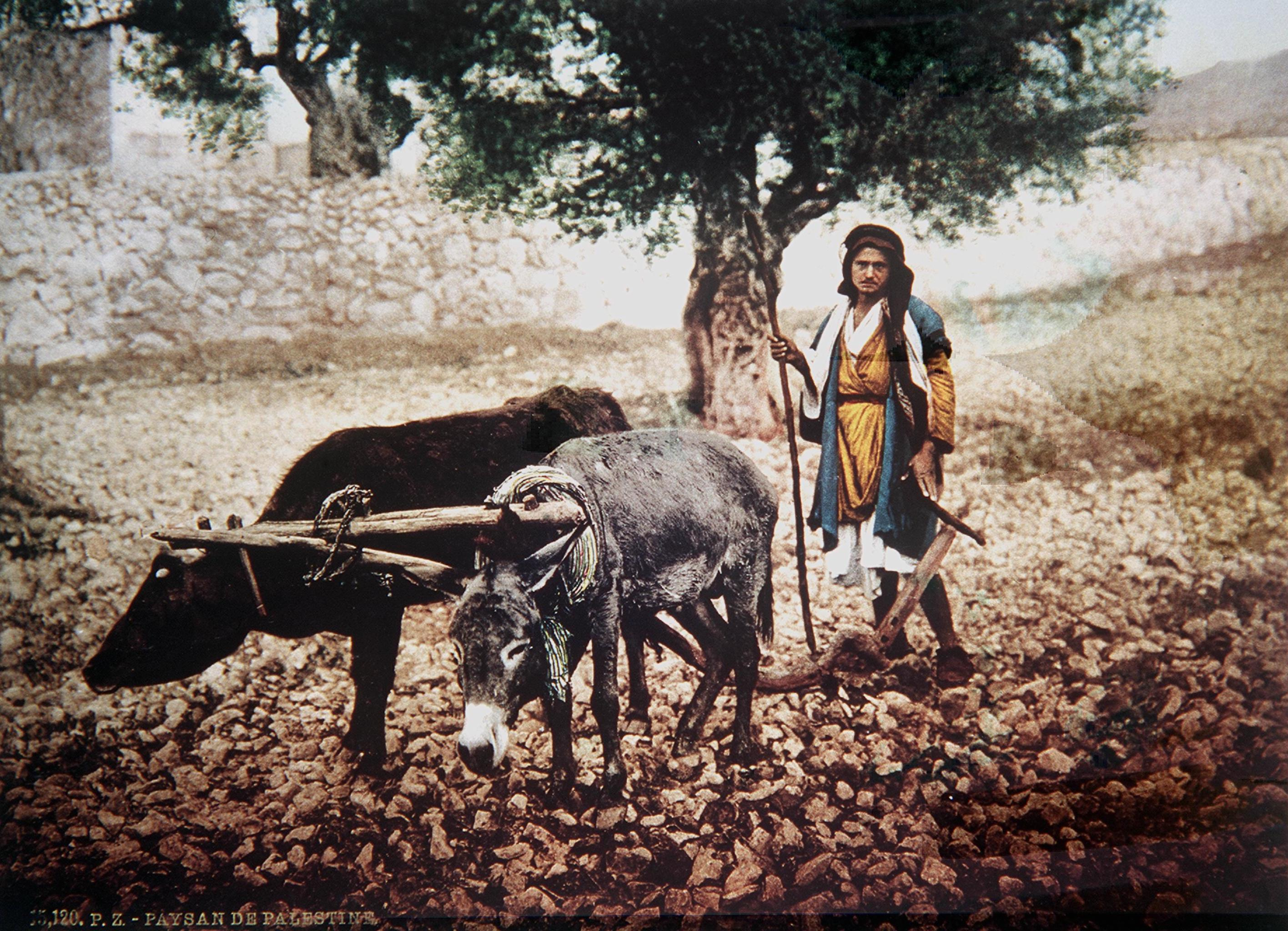
A photograph of a farm worker in Palestine, 1890

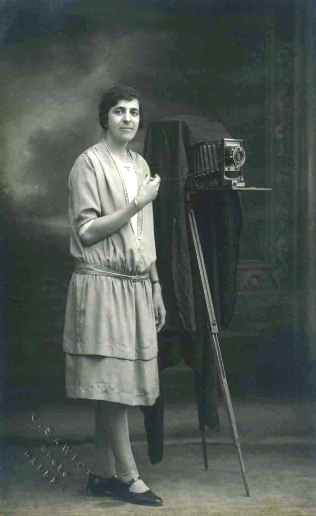
Karimeh Abbud

Around 1860, a school for teaching photography was established in the Armenian Quarter of Jerusalem. The founder was an Armenian amateur photographer named Yessai Garabedian, a priest who had moved to the city from Anatolia to become the archivist at St. James Armenian Church.

Karimeh Abbud, thought to be the first Arab woman photographer working in the region and the first woman professional photographer to offer services to the public. Her advertisement published in al-Karmel sometime in 1932 states that she is the "only national female photographer".

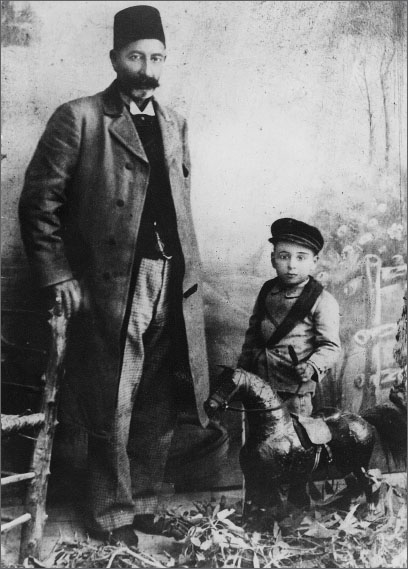
Portrait of Wasif Jawhariyyeh with his father

Early twentieth century Palestinian life is richly documented by photographers in this period. A key figure is Wasif Jawhariyyeh (1904–1972), who collated nine hundred images to create the seven volume work, The Illustrated History of Palestine.

As time went on, the availability of photography led to a vibrant market for photographic portraits. Many of these portraits were of individuals or were taken to record weddings and similar important events.

Edward Said, the Palestinian American academic, writes of the process of collating photographs for the book After the Last Sky, published in 1983 "I felt that I was actually doing it in a kind of abstract way...I was really working according to principles...within the nonrepresentational art of the Islamic world...There were certain kinds of patterns that you could see that were not representational in the sense...that they had a subject, but they had some motif and rather a musical motif". Said selected photographs from the huge archive created by Jean Mohr who had been commissioned by the UN to produce a photographic series of Palestine in 1983.

The International Red Cross also commissioned Jean Mohr to document refugee camps and living conditions in the occupied territories, and includes many of his images in their online photo archive.

Ariella Azoulay's 2011 book From Palestine to Israel: A Photographic Record of Destruction and State Formation, 1947-1950 analysed photographs from Israeli state archives in relation to key moments of the violent dispossession of the Palestinian people.

Photography continues to play an important role in preserving documentation of Palestinian life and thought, especially through photojournalism.

== Photojournalism ==
Younger photographers have used the medium of photography to communicate with the world and in recent histories of the occupation photography has been used to bear witness to Israeli state violence. This includes the work of photojournalists, activists, and ordinary citizens whose use of social media seeks to gain the world’s attention of the Palestinian situation. Azza El-Hassan, a Palestinian film-maker has said that this belief, that showing the reality of the occupation to international audiences will enable political change, is a “national illusion”. The 'Photographers without Borders' project recorded the names of photojournalists killed by Israeli Occupation Forces.

Notable Palestinian photojournalists include:

- Yousef Dawas, killed by Israeli air strikes on Gaza in 2023
- Mohammed Zaanoun, who received the award for Cultures of Resistance in 2017. Zaanoun worked for Le Monde to document the impact of Israeli bombing of Gaza in 2023.
- Hind Khoudary, a journalist based in Gaza who reports for outlets including Al Jazeera English and Anadolu Agency.
- Motaz Azaiza, a photojournalist from Gaza was included in the Time magazine list of the 100 most influential people of 2024.

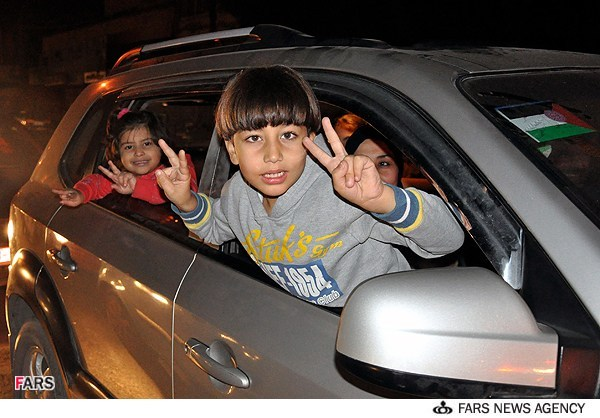
Photograph taken by Samar Abu Elouf, November 2012 of celebrations after ceasefire, Gaza Strip 2012

- Samar Abu Elouf, a freelance photographer formerly based in Gaza City. She has been working for the New York Times since 2021.

=== Photography exhibitions ===
Anchor in the Landscape.

Humans of Palestine.
