= 2012 murder on the Syrian-Turkish border =

- Location: Darkush, Syria
- Date: 26 March 2012
- Deaths: 2
- Injuries: 1
- Victims: Naseem Intriri and Walid Bledi
- Perpetrator: Syrian military

The 2012 murder on the Syrian-Turkish border is about two European-Algerian freelance journalists, Naseem Intriri and Walid Bledi, who were making a documentary about refugees and the Syrian civil war when they were killed during an attack on the Syrian border town of Darkush, Idlib Governorate, near the Turkish border. The Ba'athist Syrian government called them "infiltrators."

== Personal history ==
Naseem Intriri, sometimes transliterated as Nasim Entriri, was an Algerian/French citizen. Walid Bledi was an Algerian/British citizen.

== Incident ==
Darkush is located within Syria, borders Turkey, and is shown relative to the capital Damascus.

From inside Syria, a citizen journalist Musaab al Arabi reported two independent journalists were killed while attempting to reach the town of Darkush with a group of 50 others. This was confirmed by other reports from inside Syria. The two were covering the refugees who were fleeing. The house they were staying in was attacked by the Shabiha militia who are backing the government of President Bashar al-Assad. The journalists fled the scene when the shooting began, but soon returned to pick up equipment left behind. When they returned they were shot to death. One was shot in the head, and the other in the chest. A third and unidentified journalist was also shot at the scene. A conflicting report claimed the two journalists were killed as they were passing through the border into Turkey. The third journalist was taken to Antakya, Syria for medical treatment.

== Context ==
The two freelance journalists were filming a documentary about Syrians fleeing to Turkey to escape the violence of the Syrian civil war. At the time, the civil war caused over 200,000 Syrian citizens to be internally displaced, 30,000 to take refuge in another country, and 8,000 people killed. The Committee to Protect Journalists calls Syria "the most dangerous place for journalists" from 2011-2012.

== Impact ==
After the news, the CPJ reported that "a human rights defender and diplomatic sources" had raised questions about the press credentials of the two. Preliminary sources claim that they saw the men working as journalists with cameras, note-taking, etc. The CPJ's follow-up research raised this question but continued to investigate the situation as a "journalism related death."

== Reactions ==
A spokesperson for the Committee to Protect Journalists said, "Their deaths are yet another illustration of the grave dangers that journalists face in reporting a conflict that the Syrian government has sought to hide from the world."

Irina Bokova, director-general of UNESCO, said, "The murders of Naseem Intriri, Walid Bledi ... highlight the terrible and unacceptable price being paid by journalists trying to carry out their professional duties in Syria. I call on the Syrian authorities to launch an inquiry into these crimes and bring their perpetrators to trial. I am deeply concerned by the number of journalists killed in the country since the start of the conflict. Media professionals must be able to carry out their work without fearing for their lives. Freedom of expression is a basic human right and the corner stone of democracy."

== See also ==
- List of journalists killed during the Syrian Civil War
