= Lisel Haas =

- Born: Elise Haas; 12 October 1898; Mönchengladbach, German Empire
- Died: 20 May 1989 (aged 90); Birmingham, England
- Occupation: Photographer

Elise Haas (12 October 1898 – 20 May 1989), known as Lisel, was a German-born British Jewish photographer, whose professional career spanned nearly seven decades. She ran a photographic studio in the town of Mönchengladbach in Western Germany with her life partner, Grete Bermbach, before fleeing Nazi repression after Kristallnacht and settling in Birmingham. She became a theatre photographer before opening up a photographic studio once she became a naturalised British Citizen.

Haas's archive is held at the Library of Birmingham, and a significant collection of her theatre photography, donated by Haas before her death, is held at the Victoria and Albert Museum in London.

== Early life ==
Lisel Haas was born on 12 October 1898 to Jewish parents in Mönchengladbach, Germany, a city situated near Düsseldorf and the Netherlands border. Her mother, Bertha Haas (née Jonas), died on 26 April 1918. Her brother, Hans Erich Haas, worked as a psychoanalyst, and emigrated to Birmingham, England in 1936 alongside his wife. In her youth, Haas trained in painting, which later developed into a career in photography. She began working as a photographer in 1923, establishing her own photography business. In 1928, she opened her own photography studio at Albertusstraße 37, Mönchengladbach. Haas primarily worked as a photojournalist, and in 1929 began working for Weltwarte, a Catholic magazine, while having photographs published in many other magazines and newspapers. She also worked in theatre photography, working at Gladbach Town Theatre.

Though Haas didn’t establish herself as a commercial photographer until after the war, the portraiture she did conduct in Germany primarily focused on urban childhood. Many of her photographs focused on children posing with various toys, engaging in play, or concentrated on the everyday activities of childhood such as eating breakfast or reading.

In Mönchengladbach, Haas also met her life partner, with her life partner, Anna Alwine Margarethe Bermbach, known as Grete Bermbach. Bermbach had studied at Krefeld School of Arts and Crafts and joined Haas’ photography business in the mid-1920s, initially training as an assistant. In 1927, Bermbach became a one-third owner of the business, yet the business name was kept as ‘Lisel Haas’ because of its already established brand recognition. Both Haas and Bermbach lived in the Haas family home at Kaiserstraße 49, Mönchengladbach, where her father, Adolf Haas, also ran his clothes shop. While in Germany, she photographed several important artists and creatives, including Christian Rohlfs, Tatjanna Barbakoff and Lale Anderson.

== Leaving Germany ==
Lisel Haas's Jewish identity cemented her vulnerability during the Nazi rise to power. On 18 October 1938, Haas was issued a decree by the Gladbach local police authority forcing her to label her photography studio as a Jewish business. Later, on 9-10 November during Kristallnacht, display cases outside her studio were destroyed during the mass violence. During the Nazi era, her photographs had continued to appear in Weltwarte, though in later years they were credited as "Abbey image" rather than under her own name.

Only days after Kristallnacht, Haas and her father Adolf fled Germany on 15 November. They arrived in Birmingham in December 1938, joining her brother Erich, who had moved there with his wife Lisbet in 1936. He had settled in Edgbaston, a suburb of Birmingham, where he had established his psychoanalytic practice after Nazi Berufsverbot policies revoked Jewish professionals' rights to practice. Grete did not join Lisel immediately, instead leaving Germany in March 1939. It is believed that Grete entered the UK on a domestic service visa, as a 1939 Birmingham register lists her as a live-in domestic servant at an address in Shirley.

Both Lisel and Grete were exempt from internment. Documents from October 1939 held by the National Archive list this exemption, recording Lisel's normal occupation as ‘Photographer’, and her present occupation as 'None (Visitor). While Grete’s normal occupation was similarly listed as ‘Photographer’, ' her present occupation was listed as 'Housemaid'. Lisel was initially unable to work due to her refugee status, It wasn’t until 1940, when Alexandra Theatre Producer George Owen created a post for her that she was able to receive an official work permit. After the war, Haas applied for compensation from the local German authorities for assets lost due to Nazi persecution; the documentation relating to this application is held at the Mönchengladbach City Archive.

== Theatre work ==
In 1940, Haas received a permit to work professionally in Britain, facilitated by Alexandra Theatre producer George Owen, who sponsored her application. As Haas later recalled in her lecture notes, Owen ‘happened to see some of my pictures, and invented a job for me, which was above suspicion’. She was appointed as official photographer at the Birmingham Repertory Theatre, where she worked from 1940 to 1961, photographing almost every production. During this period she photographed many promising young actors, including Albert Finney, Ian Richardson, Brian Blessed, June Brown and Derek Jacobi. Haas became close friends with Owen and with the then-director of Birmingham Rep, Barry Jackson. She also photographed productions at the Birmingham Crescent Theatre, the Alexandra Theatre Birmingham, Belgrade Theatre Coventry and the Kidderminster Playhouse.

Reflecting on her theatre work, Haas noted that ‘the greatest difficulty in stage photography lies in the effect of the acting on the artist’, that following a particularly powerful or moving performance, actors were often exhausted. She observed, however, that ‘we often get the best pictures from the least important plays’.

Her theatre photography archive is now held primarily at the Victoria and Albert Museum in London, with further copies in the Birmingham City Archives.

Following Barry Jackson's death in April 1961, Haas fell out with the new management at the Rep, who hired new, young male photographers without informing her. She resigned from her position in 1961. In October 1965, Lisel resigned from her position as official photographer at the Crescent Theatre. After this, she moved away entirely from theatre photography, moving to commissioned, studio portraiture.

== Portrait photography ==
Following her departure from theatre photography, Haas pivoted almost entirely to commissioned portrait photography, primarily working with families. After becoming naturalised British citizens in 1947, Haas and Bermbach were able to open their own portrait studio at their home at 4 Grove Avenue, Moseley. Within the studio, the two worked in close collaboration; Haas was the public face of the business, conducting the photography itself, while Bermbach worked behind the scenes handling the developing and retouching. During the 1960s and 1970s, it was considered something of a mark of respectability among middle-class Birmingham families to have their portraits taken by Haas, and she was in considerable demand.

Haas had long expressed a preference for portrait work. In a speech to the Birmingham Jewish Women’s Luncheon Club in 1961, she reflected: ‘As much as I liked my permit for stage and artists, I was glad when, after the war and my naturalisation, my partner and I took up portrait photography again’. She attributed this preference in part to her interest in psychology and the connection she felt with her sitters, describing the photographer as ‘a kind of magician, who sees through the mask which we all wear’.

Haas was particularly celebrated for her work with children, emphasising naturalness over posed formality. She described her approach as follows: ‘I don't like stereotypical poses and I like to surprise children, to catch them. I usually play with them until they overcome their inhibitions, and then I really have nothing left to do but to observe the endless series of expressions on their eager faces, to wait for the right moment and to photograph’.

== Personal life in Birmingham ==
Haas and Bermbach built a close-knit community in Birmingham. Haas's father Adolf, who had fled Germany alongside her in 1938, died on 5 February 1943, before the end of the Second World War. Her brother Erich, remained a significant presence in her life. Erich was one of the founding organisers of the Birmingham Jewish Refugee Club, which began operations in May 1939, and was an active figure in Birmingham's Jewish community. Haas was close to his daughter, her niece Dorothy, who later served as a source for biographical accounts of her aunt's life.

Haas and Bermbach moved into 4 Grove Avenue, Mosely in 1949. The house itself had been bequeathed to them by George Owen, the Alexandra Theatre producer who had originally sponsored Haas's work permit, having lived with them for a period after his home was destroyed during the Birmingham Blitz.

Grete's niece Brigitte moved to England in 1947 after marrying English soldier Alec Pearson, whom she had met at the Mönchengladbach army base in 1946. For Grete, known affectionately within the Pearson family as "Dete", having her niece settle in England was particularly meaningful. Together Brigitte and Alec had two children, Nicholas and Francesca. Grete became godmother to Nicholas, while Haas was made godmother to Francesca. The family later moved to Cambridge in the early 1960s when Alec took up a position at Homerton College.

Haas took immense pride in her work and was a vigorous advocate for her professional rights, regularly pursuing organisations who reproduced her work without paying copyright fees or providing appropriate credit. She was a member of numerous professional bodies, including the British Institute of Photography, of which she became a life member in 1986, and was part of Soroptimist International.

== Later life ==
In her final years, Grete's health declined significantly, and she spent time in a nursing home in Birmingham as her dementia worsened. Haas acted as her devoted carer throughout this period. Grete died on 4 June 1979 aged 79 and was cremated at Yardley Crematorium, Birmingham. Haas continued her portraiture work after Grete's death, outsourcing the developing work that Grete had previously handled, though the loneliness and difficulty of those final years was noted by those close to her. Lisel Haas died on 20 May 1989 in Birmingham, aged 90.

== Legacy ==
Shortly before her death, Haas donated a large collection of her Rep theatre photographs to the V&A Theatre Museum, gifting both the original negatives and their copyright, a selection of which have since been digitised and made available through the V&A images website. Following Haas's death, Pete James (1958–2018), Curator of Photography Collections at the Library of Birmingham from 1989 to 2015, arranged to collect and preserve her work. The resulting Lisel Haas Archive, held at the Library of Birmingham, fills 258 boxes: around 90 boxes of developed photographic prints, 93 folders of celluloid negatives, 45 boxes of glass negatives and approximately 30 boxes of miscellaneous documents including letters, lecture notes, invoices and business ephemera. Additional smaller deposits were made to the archive in 1999, 2007, 2008, 2009 and 2011. Further significant materials relating to Haas and the Haas family are held at the Mönchengladbach City Archive, including Haas's compensation application and correspondence with historian Günther Erkens.

The primary scholarly work on Haas is Amy Shulman's 2011 MPhil thesis, 'Photography, memory and identity: the emigre photographer Lisel Haas (1898-1989)', which draws substantially on oral testimony from Haas's niece Dorothy Williams. Shulman argues that Haas ‘used family portrait photography in an attempt to overcome personal losses of home and family’, and that it is possible Haas ‘was able to deliver such a natural portrait photograph because of a longing for her own family identity to be restored’. These arguments have been questioned on several grounds: that Haas was not disconnected from her family, having travelled to Birmingham with her father and joined her brother who had already settled there; that such a reading reduces Haas's considerable commercial skill and intelligence to gendered assumptions unlikely to be applied to a male photographer; and that it risks imposing heteronormative assumptions upon her life, given that Haas lived with Grete Bermbach as her life partner for the entirety of her adult life.

Haas is one of the subjects featured in Frauen und Mönchengladbach (Women and Mönchengladbach), published in November 2025, a volume dedicated to recovering the histories of women who shaped the city of Mönchengladbach across its history.

In 2025, Stolpersteines were laid in Mönchengladbach in memory of Lisel Haas, her father Adolf Haas, and Grete Bermbach. The ceremony was initiated by Ilona Gerhards of the city of Mönchengladbach.

In 2026, Bertz Associates produced an exhibition and accompanying publication at the Library of Birmingham dedicated to Haas's life and work. The exhibition, developed in collaboration with the Library of Birmingham's archive, presented theatre photography, portraits and personal photographs, alongside responses from contemporary artists. The accompanying publication, Discovering Lisel Haas, edited by Iris Bertz and Jen Wilbur, was published in July 2026. Both the exhibition and publication were supported by the National Lottery through Arts Council England, The National Archives and the John Feeney Charitable Trust. The John Feeney Charitable Trust additionally funded the commissioning of a blue plaque in remembrance of Lisel Haas, along with a series of public archive exploration workshops to raise awareness of the archive.

Haas' theatre and portrait photography made significant contributions to the visual history of Birmingham. Her theatre photography provides a comprehensive documentation of Birmingham Repertory Theatre productions across two decades, while her family portrait photography preserves documented memories of numerous Birmingham families. Haas believed that photography was ‘a universal language through which we are able to remember events and personal memories’, and felt that ‘life provided the link between her and her sitters, and gave the pictures their force and effect’. As a Jewish refugee photographer, targeted by the Nazi regime and forced to flee her home country, her body of work resists attempted historical erasure. Her partially catalogued archive is a significant resource for researchers of twentieth century photography, theatre history and the history of Birmingham's Jewish community.
