= Samar Abu Elouf =

Palestinian photojournalist (born 1980s)

- سمر أبو العوف
- Born: 1983 or 1984 (age 41–42); Gaza, Palestine
- Occupation: Photojournalist
- Awards: World Press Photo of the Year; 2025; George Polk Award for Photojournalism; 2023

Samar Abu Elouf (Arabic: سمر أبو العوف; born 1983 or 1984), sometimes romanized as Samar Abu Ouf, is a Palestinian photojournalist whose work documents life in Palestine. She has worked for Reuters and The New York Times.

== Career ==
Abu Elouf is from Gaza. Abu Elouf was 26 when she began seeking a career, desiring more purpose beyond being a housewife. She was drawn to photography and began taking photos despite the reprimands of her then-husband and her family. In 2010, she enrolled in photography classes and taught herself with online tutorials. In 2012, she won a prize in UNRWA's "Change the Picture" contest for one of her photos of children celebrating a birthday. She began freelance work with Reuters, Middle East Eye, and local magazine Al Ghaidaa. While covering a border protest in Gaza in 2015, Elouf improvised a helmet from a cooking pot and made a vest with "press" written on it to make it clear that she was a photographer documenting the events.

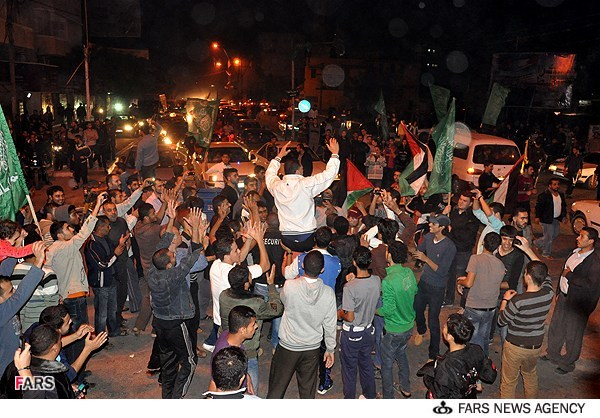
Elouf photographed Palestinians celebrating the end of the 2012 Gaza War.

After the onset of the Gaza war, she began living out of her Jeep and traveled between cities to report and document the aftermath of airstrikes. Her home in Gaza City was destroyed in an airstrike. She won the 2023 George Polk Award for Photojournalism, jointly with Yousef Masoud, for her photographs for The New York Times of the Israeli invasion of the Gaza Strip in late 2023. In December 2024, Abu Elouf and Israeli photographer Avishag Shaar-Yashuv jointly won the UNICEF Photo of the Year award for their portraits of child survivors of the Gaza war and October 7 attacks, 2023, respectively.

In December 2023, she and her children evacuated to Doha in Qatar with assistance from The New York Times. Since leaving Gaza, Abu Elouf's photography has documented the lives of other displaced people. While in Doha, Abu Elouf lived near Mahmoud Ajjour, a child who lost both his arms due to an Israeli airstrike; Elouf took a portrait photograph of Ajjour, with permission from his mother, as part of a news report on people wounded during the war in Gaza receiving medical treatment in Qatar. The picture was recognised as the 2025 World Press Photo of the Year.

== Positions ==
Samar Abu Elouf told Die Zeit that it was known which journalists in the Gaza Strip were working with Hamas and which were not. There were many of the latter, yet both groups were being targeted by the Israeli army. Abu Elouf explicitly referred to the case of 25-year-old photojournalist Fatima Hassouna, who was killed on April 16, 2025, in an Israeli airstrike on her family, along with seven to ten relatives.

== Awards and honours ==
- 2023 George Polk Award for Photojournalism, jointly with Yousef Masoud
- 2024 Anja Niedringhaus Courage in Photojournalism Award, International Women's Media Foundation
- 2024 International Press Freedom Award, Canadian Journalists for Free Expression
- 2024 UNICEF Photo of the Year, jointly with Israeli photographer Avishag Shaar-Yashuv
- 2024 Visa d'Or Daily Press Award, Visa pour l'Image

== Personal life ==
Abu Elouf has four children; she and her children are based in Doha, Qatar as of 2024. During the 2021 Israel–Palestine crisis 14 of Elouf's family members were killed in an explosion.

== See also ==
- History of Palestinian journalism
- Photography in Palestine
