= Patrick Brown (photographer) =

Australian photojournalist and photographer (born 1969)

- Born: January 23, 1969 (age 57); Sheffield, England, UK
- Occupation: Photojournalist
- Spouse: Camilla Wøldike (m. 2012)
- Website: patrickbrownphoto.com

Patrick Brown (born January 23, 1969) is an Australian photo journalist and photographer.

== Biography ==
Patrick Brown was born in Sheffield, England, and spent his childhood in the Middle East and Africa before his family settled in Perth, Western Australia.

He is the author of Trading to Extinction (2014), a book documenting illegal animal trade in Asia, which was also the basis for a documentary produced by Vice Media.

In 2019, he published No Place on Earth, which details the experiences of survivors of the 2017 persecution of the Rohingya population in Myanmar.

Brown has contributed to Rolling Stone, The New Yorker, TIME, Newsweek, Vanity Fair, National Geographic, and Mother Jones. In addition to his editorial work, he has collaborated with organizations including UNICEF, UNHCR, Fortify Rights, and Human Rights Watch.

Brown's photography has been exhibited internationally, including at the Centre of Photography in New York, the Metropolitan Museum of Photography in Tokyo, and Visa pour l’Image in France. His work is also held in various private collections.

== Awards ==
Brown's project on the illegal trade of endangered animals received a World Press Photo Award in 2004, and a multimedia award from Pictures of the Year International (POYi) in 2008. Trading to Extinction was also recognised by the American magazine Photo as one of the ten best photo documentary books of 2014.

In 2018, Brown was awarded a World Press Photo award in the category "General News, Singles" for his documentation of Rohingya refugees in Bangladesh. The awarded photograph showed the bodies of Rohingya refugees who drowned after the boat they were using to flee Myanmar capsized. The work was commissioned by Panos Pictures for UNICEF.

In 2019, Brown received the FotoEvidence Book Award. He also received an Emmy Award for his work on the Alex Gibney HBO film The Forever Prisoner, which won Outstanding Investigative Documentary.
