= Rija Randrianasolo =

Madagascan photojournalist

Rijasolo
- Born: 1973 (age 52–53)
- Known for: Photojournalist
- Awards: A World Press Photo award

Rija Randrianasolo (born 1973), known as Rijasolo, is a photojournalist based in Antananarivo, Madagascar. He won a World Press Photo Award for Africa 2022 in the long-term category, and Paritana Contemporary Art Award in 2019.

== Life and work ==
Randrianasolo was born in France and is currently based in Antananarivo, Madagascar. He was a reporter-photographer during the French presidential campaign in 2007 for Wostok Press agency. He was awarded a grant from the Pulitzer Center on Crisis Reporting.

== Awards ==
- Leica 35 mm Wide Angle contest, Leica Camera, 2010
- Paritana Contemporary Art Award, 2019
- World Press Photo Award for Africa, Long-Term Category, 2022

== Publications ==
- Madagascar, nocturnes. No Comment, 2013. ISBN 979-1090721067.
