= Mustafa Seven =

Turkish photojournalist

- Born: 1974 (age 51–52); Sivas, Turkey
- Occupations: Photo journalist; Street photographer
- Website: mustafaseven.com

Mustafa Seven (born 1974) is a Turkish photojournalist and street photographer. His work captures intimate, candid scenes of everyday moments in Istanbul and around the world.

== Life and career ==
Seven was born in Sivas, Turkey in 1974. He began his career as a photojournalist at Sabah in 1995, later working for Hürriyet, Gazete Pazar, Milliyet and Akşam, where he was the photo editor.

After nearly two decades in photojournalism, Seven shifted his focus to street photography. In 2006, he founded GİF (Güzel İşler Fotoğraf Galerisi), where he undertook advertising and independent photography projects. He held his first solo exhibition called Tek in 2013, which was first presented at Nişantaşı Gallery Eksen in Istanbul from 7 to 28 March 2013. In 2014, he participated in the ComeSeeTurkey project, capturing culturally and geographically significant imagery across the country.

Seven launched the Instagram project "Faces of the Earth" in 2015 to share anonymous portraits from around the globe. Same year, he was appointed as the jury president for the Antalya-themed photography competition organized for the 133rd anniversary of the Antalya Chamber of Commerce and Industry. In 2016, Seven's Faces of the Earth exhibition, held at Art Loft Fototrek - Olympus Gallery in Istanbul, presented portraits independent of places. In November 2016, he was featured among 20 photographers in "Ustaca Fotoğraflar", a book presenting 220 images by Turkey’s photography masters. Published by Fotoiz, the project aimed to preserve and celebrate the legacy of these artists and their contributions to Turkish visual culture.

He is an Honorary Member of Street Photography, France.

=== Jury work and competitions ===
Seven has frequently served on photography juries in Turkey and abroad. His roles include multiple appointments to the Turkish Photojournalists Association's "Press Photos of the Year" competition, as well as juries for events such as Photomaraton Istanbul, the International Golden Saffron Photography Competition, the national contest Life in the Days of COVID-19. He has also contributed to cultural initiatives like the National Photo Safari in Ağrı and outreach programmes with Akdeniz University students.

Seven was a member of the international selection committee for UNESCO's Silk Roads Youth Research Grant Programme in both 2023 and 2024.

== Educational work and affiliations ==
He conducts street and mobile photography workshops and collaborates with universities and cultural institutions. He is a member of professional bodies such as the Turkish Photojournalists Association, International Federation of Journalists, Turkish Journalists' Union, and FOTON Association.

== Exhibitions ==
- 2013 TEK, Galeri Eksen Istanbul
- 2014 TEK, Bursa Fotograf Festivali, Cemal Nadir Güler Sanat Galerisi
- 2015 Faces of The Earth (Dünyanın Suretleri) Congresium Ankara
- 2016 Faces of the Earth (Dünyanın Suretleri), Antalya Fotograf Festivali
- 2016 Story of İstanbul, Tomtom Galeri
- 2016 Faces of The Earth (Dünyanın Suretleri) ArtLoft Fototrek Olympus Galeri, Istanbul
- 2017 Artriangle 3 Şehrin Hikayesi 42 Maslak Art Space Galeri, Istanbul
- 2017 Kapalıçarşı Yüzleri, Kapalıçarşı, Istanbul
- 2018 Faces of The Earth (Dünyanın Suretleri) Edeltraud Deutsche Sprache und Kultur, Munich
- 2019 Story Of Istanbul, CNR Kitap Fuarı, Istanbul
- 2019 Ben istersem, İBB Taksim Sanat Galerisi, Istanbul
- 2021 Göz Göze, Bursa Fotograf Festivali, Bursa
- 2022 İstanbul Kültür Yolu Festivali, Taksim Meydanı
- 2024 Portraits on the Trail of Anatolia, Azerbaijan Cultural Center, Paris

== Bibliography ==
- Seven, Mustafa (2021). Sokak Fotoğrafçılığı (in Turkish). İstanbul: Doğan Kitap. ISBN 9789751044747.
- Seven, Mustafa (2017). *Sokak Fotografciligi* (in Turkish). İstanbul: İnkılâp Kitabevi. ISBN 9789751034410.
