= Inger Vandyke =

Australian wildlife photojournalist

Inger Vandyke is an Australian wildlife photojournalist, explorer, and global expedition leader. She has photographed rare snow leopards in the wild. She was honoured in 2013 as an International Member of the Explorer's Club for her work in documenting the vanishing culture of Tibet.
