= Ferzat Jarban =

Syrian journalist killed while covering the Syrian civil war

Ferzat Jaban (died November 19 or 20, 2011) was the first Syrian journalist reported to be killed while covering the Syrian civil war, according to the Committee to Protect Journalists.

Jarban was a Syrian freelance cameraman who was found dead one day after being arrested for reporting on an anti-government protest and the clashes between protesters and security forces in Al-Qusayr, Homs Governorate, Syria. His videos have appeared on several Arab satellite news outlets.

== Death ==
Ferzat Jarban, a Syrian, was arrested on Saturday, 19 November 2011, while videotaping protests against the President Bashar al-Assad's government in Al-Qusayr, according to eyewitnesses. Jarban's body was found the next morning on the street side and his corpse was "extremely mutilated," which included his eyes being gouged out, and with two bullet wounds.

According to reports at least four more people were killed by security forces in al-Qasir on Sunday November 20, 2011. Just a day after Jarban was arrested and the same day he was found killed.

== Context ==
The arrests and disappearance of other journalists in Syria over the past months is being tracked by the CPJ and other press freedom organizations. It is unknown whether Jarban was the first journalist killed in Syria because others are missing. At the time Jarban was killed, the protests against the ruling government in Syria were in their eight-month and were becoming increasingly violent as the army is backing President Bashir and human rights groups estimate that 3,500 have died so far. At the same time, international responses to Syria, such as those by the Arab League and Turkey, have also escalated.

Jarban's murder occurred the day after the Assad government dismissed a monitoring mission demanded by the Arab League by calling for changes in the plan, and Syrian forces had killed 17 people on Saturday.

== Reactions ==
Mohamed Abdel Dayem, the CPJ program coordinator for Middle East and North Africa, said, "The brutal murder of Ferzat Jarban illustrates the lengths to which the Syrian government will go in its efforts to suppress independent reporting. We demand the release of all journalists who remain in custody and hold the government accountable for their well-being."

Irina Bokova, director-general of UNESCO, said: "This ruthless attack must not go unpunished. It is a violation of the basic human right of freedom of expression and of journalists’ inalienable right and duty to carry out their work in safety and without hindrance. I call on the government of Syria to stop all forms of violence against journalists immediately. I also appeal to the authorities to put an end to flagrant repression against those who report on current events in the country."

== See also ==
- List of journalists killed during the Syrian civil war
- List of photojournalists
- Syrian civil war
