= Patrick Rohr =

Patrick Rohr (born May 4, 1968, in Glarus) is a former Swiss TV presenter. He began his career at Swiss national television in 1992 and currently works as a communications consultant and photographer based between Zurich and Amsterdam.

== Work ==
=== Journalism ===
On November 1, 1999, Rohr replaced Filippo Leutenegger as the host and lead editor on the political broadcast Arena. August 23, 2002 he became the successor for Röbi Koller as host of the society magazine «Quer». He hosted this magazine until its cancellation in March 2007.

From February 2012 to December 2015 Rohr attended and completed a programme on documentary and portrait photography at the Fotoacademie Amsterdam. His multimedia graduation project was called Bloody Serious – Trying To Understand The Difficult Search for a Ukrainian Identity. Today he is working as a photojournalist for Helvetas, Glückskette, Ruedi Lüthy Foundation, Support Network, among others, and also travels to various countries, especially in Africa and Asia, for freelance products (i.e. documentary Fokus Japan).

In May 2018, Rohr visited the Cox’s Bazar refugee camp in Bangladesh, which at the time was the largest refugee camp in the world. His visit and photographs documenting the conditions in the camp were featured by Swiss public broadcaster SRF.

=== Communication consulting ===
In 2009, Rohr gave a public talk on political communication at a municipal campaign event in Horgen.

In 2015, he moderated the Wirtschaftsforum Toggenburg, a regional economic summit attended by government and business representatives, including figures from Economiesuisse and the Boston Consulting Group.

In 2023, he provided expert commentary to the Tages-Anzeiger on the communication strategy of Credit Suisse chairman Axel Lehmann during the bank’s final annual general meeting.

== Publications ==
- Reden wie ein Profi: Selbstsicher auftreten – im Beruf, privat, in der Öffentlichkeit. [Speaking Like a Pro: Appearing Confident – at Work, in Private and in Public] (in German), Beobachter-Verlag, 2008, ISBN 978-3-85569-398-6
- So meistern Sie jedes Gespräch. Mutig und souverän argumentieren – im Beruf und privat. [How to master every conversation: Debate Bravely and Confidently – at Work and in Private] (in German), Beobachter-Verlag, 2009, ISBN 978-3-85569-424-2
- Erfolgreich präsent in den Medien – Clever kommunizieren als Unternehmen, Verein, Behörde. [Successfully present in media – Communicating cleverly as a company, a club, authority] (in German), Beobachter-Verlag, 2011, ISBN 978-3-85569-464-8
- Japan – Abseits von Kirschblüten und Kimono. [Japan – Away from Cherry Blossoms and Kimono] (in German), Beobachter-Edition, 2011, ISBN 978-3-03875-063-5
- Die neue Seidenstrasse. Chinas Weg zur Weltmacht: Eine fotojournalistische Reise. [The New Silk Road. China's Path to World Power: A Photojournalistic Journey] (in German), Orell Füssli Verlag, Zürich 2021, ISBN 978-3-280-05731-5
