= Jan Grarup =

Danish photographer

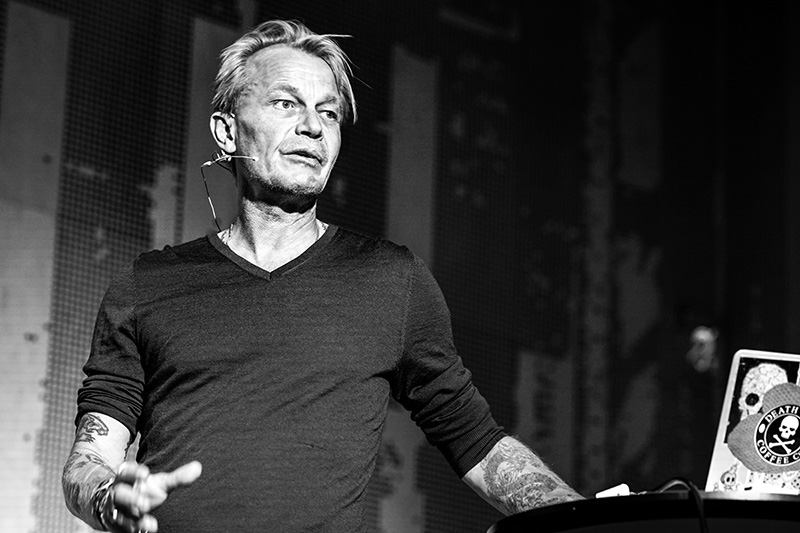
- Grarup in Aarhus, 2017
- Born: 2 December 1968 (age 57)
- Occupation: Photographer
- Years active: 1992–present
- Website: jangrarup.photoshelter.com

Jan Grarup (born 1968) is a Danish photojournalist who has worked both as a staff photographer and as a freelance, specializing in war and conflict photography.

== Early life ==
Grarup was born in Kvistgaard, not far from Helsingør, in the north of the Danish island of Sjælland. He got his first camera when he was 13 and began to develop black and white photographs. At the age of 15 he took a photograph of a traffic accident and sent it in to the local newspaper Helsingør Dagblad where it was published. When he was 17, he spent his Easter holidays in Belfast at the time of the Troubles, gaining an appetite for conflicts.

After studying journalism and photography at the Danish School of Journalism in Aarhus from 1989 to 1991, he became first a trainee, then a full-time photographer with the Danish tabloid Ekstra Bladet.

== Career ==
In 1991, the year he graduated, Grarup won the Danish Press Photographer of the Year award, a prize he would receive on several further occasions. In 1993, he moved to Berlin for a year, working as a freelance photographer for Danish newspapers and magazines.

During his career, Grarup has covered many wars and conflicts around the world including the Gulf War, the Rwandan genocide, the Siege of Sarajevo and the Palestinian uprising against Israel in 2000. His coverage of the conflict between Palestine and Israel gave rise to two series: The Boys of Ramallah, which also earned him the Pictures of the Year International World Understanding Award in 2002, followed by The Boys from Hebron.

His book, Shadowland (2006), presents his work during the 12 years he spent in Kashmir, Sierra Leone, Chechnya, Rwanda, Kosovo, Slovakia, Ramallah, Hebron, Iraq, Iran, and Darfur. In the words of Foto8's review, it is "intensely personal, deeply felt, and immaculately composed." His second book, Darfur: A Silent Genocide, was published in 2009.

Per Folkver, Picture Editor in Chief of the Copenhagen daily Politiken, where Grarup has worked, has said of Grarup that "He is concerned about what he is seeing and doing longer stories and returning to the same places."

After leaving his post at Politiken in the autumn of 2009, he joined the small Danish photographic firm Das Büro in January 2010 where he concentrated on the national market. He continues his international work with NOOR photo agency in Amsterdam, of which he is a cofounder.

Up from 2010 photographs include those of the earthquake in Haiti taken for Time and Dagbladet Information. In late 2011, Garup covered the refugee camp in Dadaab, Kenya.

== Controversy ==
In September 2023 Grarup was fired by his newspaper Politken after he admitted to lying about his experiences covering the war in Ukraine. Subsequent stories in Danish media cast further doubt on the integrity of his work in Ukraine, and Palestine.

Later in September 2023 the radiostation 24syv uncovered that it is not only the Ukraine trip where crucial details and facts had been embellished. The journalists Mille Ørsted and Niels Frederik Rickers revealed with compelling facts that an essay "Turist i mit eget mareridt" ("Tourist in my own nightmare") in Politiken, which Grarup wrote on 7 April 2019—the 25th anniversary of the genocide in Rwanda—is fraught with contradictions and contradictory claims about central details. Furthermore, the two journalists cast doubt on whether Garup was even in Rwanda at the time he claims, and whether very strong and gory details about two children he claims to have met are accurately reproduced or may be wholly or partially invented.

In late September 2023 Grarup's former employer Politiken launched an investigation into his work for the newspaper after numerous news stories with serious allegations. In October 2023 Mayday Press published an 82-page report about Grarup's work in Rwanda during and after the genocide. One of many lies the report documents, is the amount of time Grarup spent in the country. According to himself, he was there for seven weeks, but the compelling evidence puts Grarup in Rwanda during the genocide for only max 36 hours. On November 10, 2023 Politiken published their findings regarding his work for the paper in the period 2009 to 2023. The report confirms the public allegations.

== Publications ==
- Jan Grarup (2006). Shadowland'. Politiken. ISBN 978-87-567-7763-6.
- Jan Grarup (2009). Darfur: A Silent Genocide. Trolley Books. ISBN 978-1-904563-66-2.
- Jan Grarup (2009). Attack on Gaza. Trolley Books. ISBN 978-1-907112-00-3.
- Jan Grarup (2013). Mærket for Livet. Gyldendal. ISBN 978-8-702144-43-7.
- Jan Grarup (2013). Marked for Life. Gyldendal. ISBN 978-8-702159-29-5.
- Jan Grarup (2016). Rejser i Danmark. [Gyldendal. ISBN 978-8-792725-58-5.
- Jan Grarup (2017). And Then There Was Silence. Book Lab.
- Jan Grarup (2018). Hvor jernkorsene gror - En krigsfotografs erindringer. Gyldendal. ISBN 978-8-702159-92-9.
- Jan Grarup, Adam Holm (2023). While we bleed. Book Lab. ISBN 9788794091206

== Awards ==
- 1991: Picture of the year, Denmark. 1st. prize – Photographer of the year
- 1995: Picture of the year, Denmark. 1st. prize – Photographer of the year
- 2000: Picture of the year, Denmark. 1st. prize – Photographer of the year
- 2001: World Press Photo – 1st. prize, People in the news – stories
- 2001: UNICEF – Children photo of the Year. Jury's Special Award.
- 2001: Visa pour l'Image – VISA D`Or – Finalist.
- 2002: World Press Photo – 1st. prize, People in the news – stories
- 2002: Pictures of the Year International World Understanding Award
- 2002: Finalist, W. Eugene Smith Memorial Fund for Humanistic Photography, New York.
- 2002: UNICEF Children photo of the year award. 1st. Prize
- 2003: Picture of the year, Denmark.
- 2003: Feature Story of the Year, Denmark.
- 2004: Picture of the year, Denmark. 1st. prize – Photographer of the year
- 2005: Visa d'or.
- 2008: Picture of the year, Denmark. 1st. prize – Photographer of the year
- 2011: Leica Oskar Barnack Award winner.
- 2013: I Shot It, 1st prize, Black and White 2nd Quarter 2012.
- 2013: World Press Photo, 1st prize stories, Sports Feature.
- 2022: Sony World Photography Awards 2022, 1st prize Documentary Projects.

== See also ==
- Photography in Denmark
