= Tsuru University =

- 都留文科大学
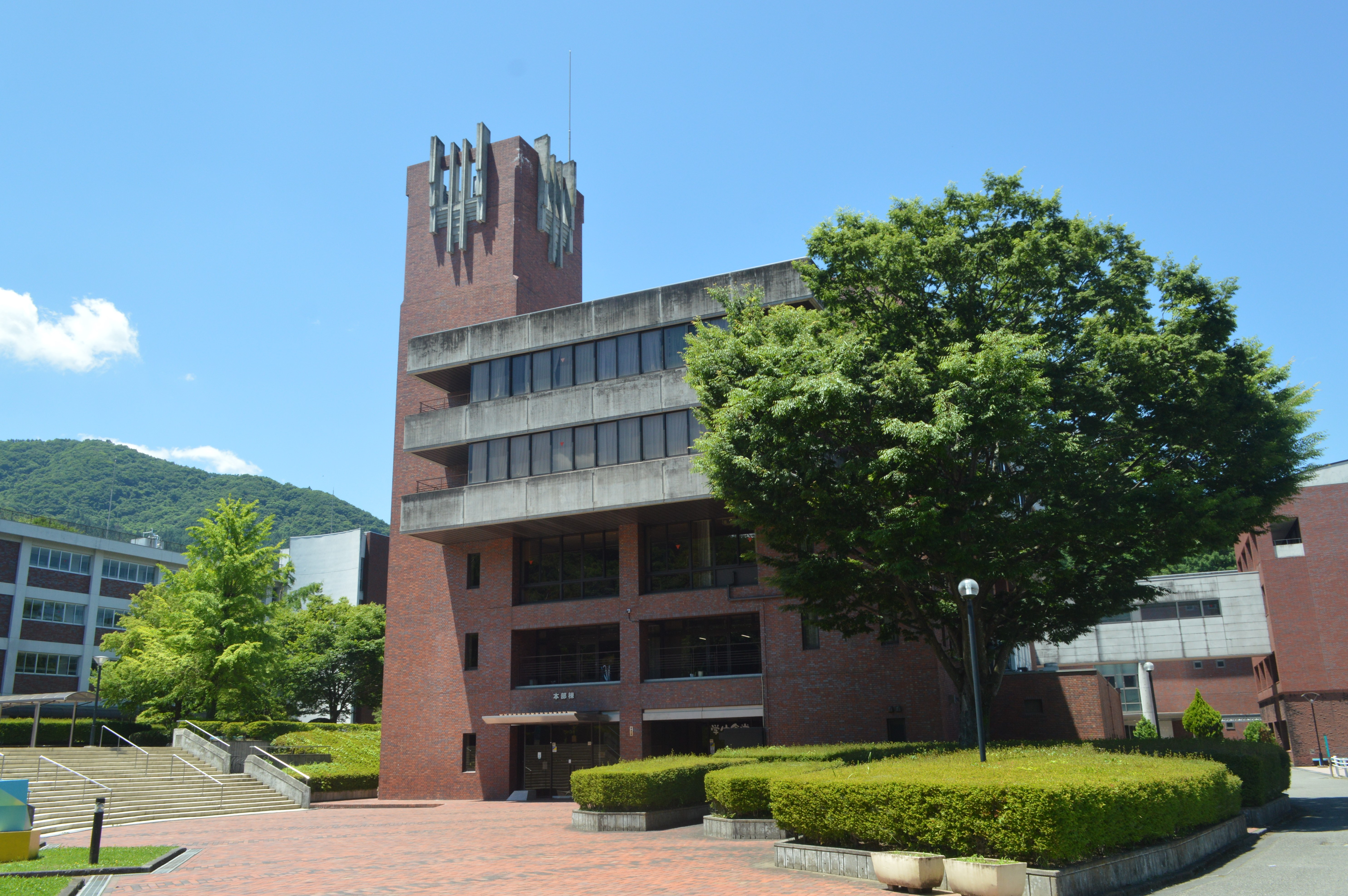
- Type: Public
- Established: Founded 1953; Chartered 1960
- President: Akira Imatani
- Academic staff: 81 full-time
- Students: ca. 3,000
- Location: Tsuru, Yamanashi, Japan; 35°32′18″N 138°53′49″E
- Campus: Suburb
- Website: www.tsuru.ac.jp

Tsuru University (都留文科大学 Tsuru Bunka Daigaku, literally Tsuru University of Humanities) is a small municipal university located in Tsuru City, Yamanashi Prefecture, Japan. The university has around 3,000 students and 85 faculty. The campus rises into the mountains overlooking the 35,000 residents of Tsuru City.

== History ==
The university was first created by Yamanashi Prefecture in 1953 as the Temporary School for Teacher Training.

In 1955, Tsuru City renamed the facility Tsuru Municipal Junior College to reflect the expanded programming being offered. The school curriculum consisted of two courses: Teacher Training for Primary School Education and Commerce. In 1960, the college was reorganized into a four-year university and became Tsuru University. The curriculum emphasized a liberal arts education overseen by a Faculty of Humanities.

Many alumni have gone on to become teachers all over Japan.

== Japanese Studies Program ==
Tsuru University inaugurated its Japanese Studies in Tsuru (JST) Program in 1998 under an agreement with the University of California as a part of bilateral efforts to promote friendly relations and academic exchange between the two universities. This program is administered by Professor Mineko Takiguchi. Every semester, an average of 10 UC students have the opportunity to take classes in Japanese language and culture. In exchange, Tsuru students are able to compete for the chance to study at any of the UC campuses.

The first international contact came about in 1978 when then-student Masanori Sakaguchi (currently retired school principal in Wakayama Prefecture) invited an Asian-American friend to stay with him and to tour the campus. Thus sparked a greater interest by many in the student body in international relations.

== Undergraduate courses ==
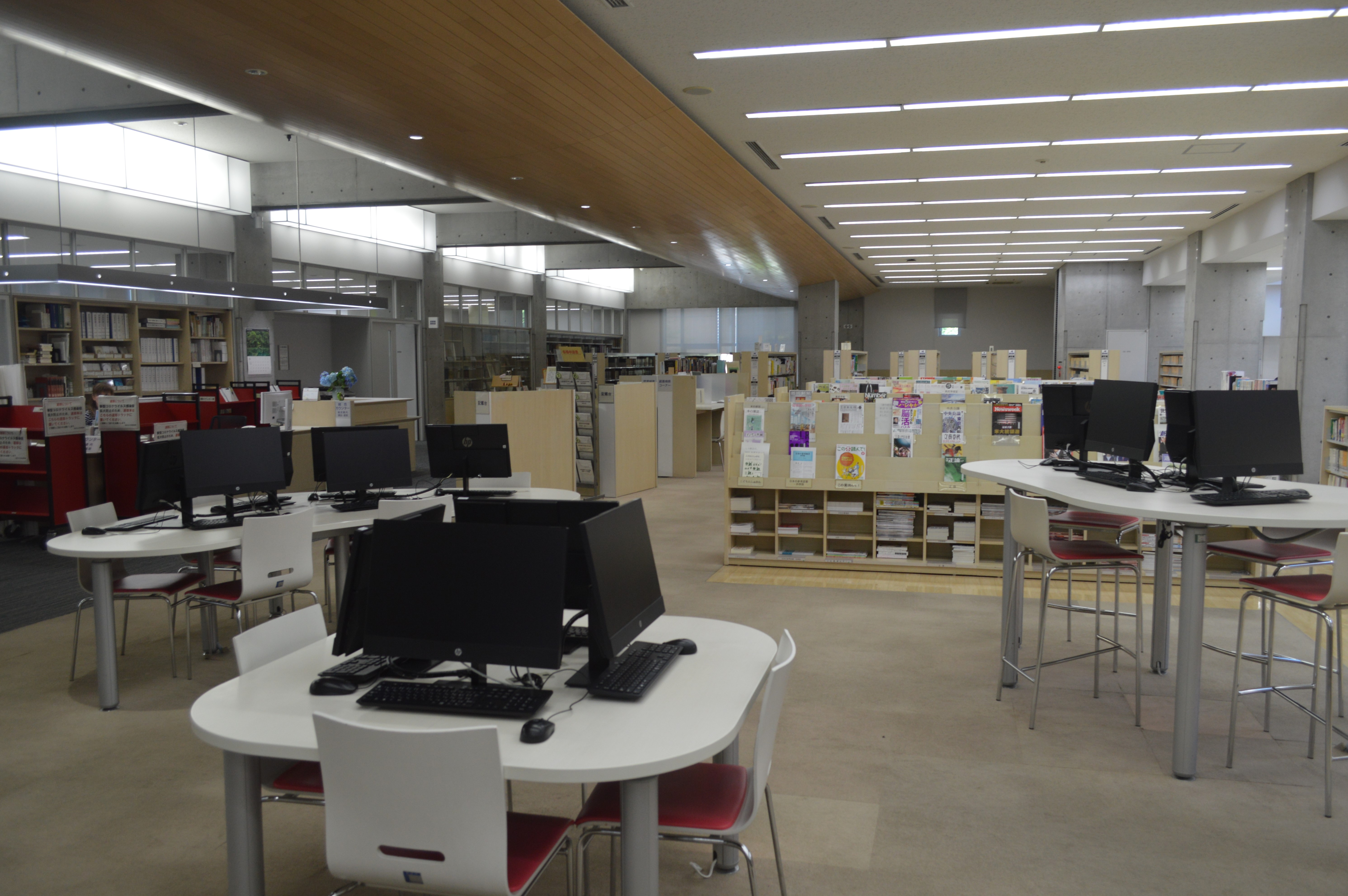
Library

- Faculty of Humanities
  - Department of Teacher Education
  - Japanese Literature
  - English Literature
  - Sociology
  - Comparative Culture
  - Global Education

== Graduate courses ==
- Graduate School of Humanities (Master Courses only)
  - Clinical Pedagogy
  - Japanese Literature
  - English Literature
  - Sociology
  - Comparative Culture
