= Jockel Finck =

German photojournalist

Jockel Finck (26 March 1962 - 28 January 2006) was a photojournalist for the Associated Press. His assignments included the fall of the Berlin Wall and the bloody disintegration of Yugoslavia.

== Life and work ==
Finck started his career as a freelancer photographer in Hanover. In 1986 he joined Associated Press in Hamburg. In 1989 he changed to the Berlin office just as communism was crumbling in East Germany. He documented the historical occurrences of the fall of the Berlin Wall and the following reunification of East and West Germany.

Finck was in action in the important disaster and conflict zones in the world, like Sarajevo, the 1990–91 Gulf War, the 2003 invasion of Iraq and the 2004 earthquake in Iran.

He died while vacationing with his family in the Bavarian town of Traunstein when he suffered a heart attack.
