= Sumy Sadurni =

Chilean-born Spanish-Mexican photographer (1989–2022)

- Born: Sumaya Maria Sadurni Carrasco; August 30, 1989; Santiago, Chile
- Died: March 7, 2022 (aged 32); Northwestern Uganda
- Education: University of the Arts London, University of Westminster
- Occupation: Photojournalist
- Years active: 2011–2022

Sumaya Maria Sadurni Carrasco (August 30, 1989 – 7 March 2022), also known as Sumy Sadurni, was a Spanish-Mexican photographer who worked as a photojournalist based in Kampala, Uganda.

== Early life and education ==
Sadurni was born in Santiago, Chile, of Mexican and Spanish descent. Her parents are Jorge Jose Sadurni Jammal and Maria Del Carmen DeCet Carrasco. She was raised in Chile, lived in Mexico, and attended high school at the International School of Lausanne in Switzerland. She attended University of the Arts London and earned a journalism degree at the University of Westminster in London.

== Career ==
After graduating, Sadurni returned to Chile to cover the 2011–2013 Chilean student protests. She then spent time in the UK photographing heavy metal gigs. After an extended trip to Uganda in 2016, she based herself in Kampala and travelled around Africa working as a freelance photojournalist.

In January 2018, she began freelance work for AFP. She worked in Uganda, South Sudan, Somaliland, and the Democratic Republic of the Congo. In Uganda, her work included the 2021 Ugandan general election and the campaign of Bobi Wine. Her work also included coverage of the COVID-19 pandemic in Uganda and the arrest of Ugandan activist Stella Nyanzi. She also documented survivors of acid attacks, activist sex workers organizing for government assistance during the COVID-19 pandemic, and women with obstetric fistula.

Her work appeared in The New York Times, the Financial Times, The Washington Post, The Guardian, El País, Le Monde, and The Irish Times.

She also served as a mentor to Ugandan photojournalists as a Uganda Press Photo award mentor, and was a teacher at Makerere University.

== Death and legacy ==
Sadurni died in a car crash in northwestern Uganda, on 7 March 2022, at the age of 32. After her death, journalists, press associations, and others shared tributes, including Ugandan human rights lawyer Nicholas Opiyo, who stated, "Sumy told the stories of forgotten people in our society (slum dwellers, amateur boxers, brewers of local gin, etc.), oppressed minorities (sex workers, fisherfolks, among others). She braved tear gas to capture stories of human rights violations."

== Awards ==
- 2020 The Guardian agency photographer of the year shortlist
