= Daniel Berehulak =

Australian photographer and photojournalist

- Born: 1975 (age 50–51); Sydney, Australia
- Education: University of New South Wales
- Occupations: Photographer and photojournalist
- Known for: Pulitzer Prize winner

Daniel Berehulak (born 1975) is an Australian photographer and photojournalist based in Mexico City. He is a staff photographer of The New York Times and has visited more than 60 countries covering contemporary issues.

In 2015, he was awarded the Pulitzer Prize for Feature Photography for his coverage of the Ebola epidemic in West Africa, and was a Pulitzer Prize finalist for his coverage of the Pakistan floods in 2010. His photography has earned five World Press Photo awards and he has twice been named Photographer of the Year by Pictures of the Year International (2014 and 2015). In 2016, he was named Photojournalist of the Year (large-circulation publications) in the National Press Photographers Association's Best of Photojournalism contest.

== Career ==
Berehulak was born in Sydney, Australia, the son of Ukrainian immigrants. After studying history at the University of New South Wales, initially he embarked on a business-oriented career. He turned to photography in 2000, working for an Australian sports agency, when he photographed the tests events for the 2000 Olympics in Sydney. In 2002, he started working for Getty Images in Sydney as a sports photographer, moving to London as a staff photographer in 2005 and was later based in New Delhi. He is a regular contributor to The New York Times and has visited more than 60 countries covering events including the Iraq and Afghan wars, the trial of Saddam Hussein, child labour in India, and the return of Benazir Bhutto to Pakistan, where he interviewed her shortly before her death. He has also documented numerous social issues and people coping with the aftermath of disasters, including the Japan tsunami and the Chernobyl. He has worked as a freelance photographer since 2013.

== Awards ==
- 2007: World Press Photo, 3rd Prize, People in the News.
- 2009: UNICEF Photo of the Year 2009, Honorable Mention.
- 2010: China International Press Photo Contest (CHIPP), China Photojournalists Society, Gold Medal for "Kids in refugee camp in Pakistan".
- 2010: World Press Photo, 1st Prize Stories, People in the News.
- 2010: Overseas Press Club, John Faber Award.
- 2011: Finalist, Pulitzer Prize for Breaking News Photography, 2011 Pulitzer Prize, for Breaking News together with Paula Bronstein for portraying the will to survive the floods in Pakistan.
- 2015: Winner, Pulitzer Prize for Feature Photography, 2015 Pulitzer Prize, for coverage of the Ebola virus epidemic in West Africa.
- 2017: Winner, Pulitzer Prize for Breaking News Photography, 2017 Pulitzer Prize, for coverage of the Philippine drug war.
- 2017: Winner, McGill Medal for Journalistic Courage from the Grady College of Journalism and Mass Communication.
