= Michael Coyne (photographer) =

Australian photographer

Michael Coyne is an Australian photojournalist. He has traveled extensively and photographed subjects including conflict, refugees and indigenous communities. Coyne's work is held in the collections of the National Gallery of Victoria, Australian War Memorial and Museum of Fine Arts, Houston. In 2001, he received the Centenary Medal from the Australian Government.

== Photojournalism ==
In 1985, Coyne was on assignment in post revolutionary Iran. News Ltd journalist Suzanne Clarke wrote that "Coyne says he is not drawn to war seeking adventure and adrenalin. "I am more interested in the people. I am not interested in the soldiers . . . but in how the people are coping.""

== Academia ==
He obtained his doctorate through publication, "A Life in Documentary Practice".

Dr Coyne is a Senior Fellow at Australia's Photography Studies College, and previously was granted the title of adjunct professor at RMIT in Melbourne in 2003.

== Plays about Coyne ==
Coyne's life has been documented in writer Graeme Pitts' plays, Tour of Duty and Second Spring – a Letter To My Daughter, which explore some of the tensions and apprehensions experienced by him in relation to his work as a photojournalist.

== Publications ==
=== Books by Coyne ===
- Coyne, Michael (1980). The Oz factor: Whoʼs doing what in Australia. Dove. ISBN 9780859241472.
- Coyne, Michael; Valenta, Tom (1992). A world of Australians. Brunswick, Vic: David Lovell. ISBN 978-1-86355-033-8.
- Coyne, Michael (1997). Second spring: the regeneration of the Jesuits. Aurora. ISBN 1-876227-01-X.
- Tour of Duty - East Timor. Melbourne: Australia-East Timor Association, 2002. With an essay by Graham Pitts. ISBN 0-9752450-2-3.
- Coyne, Michael (2005). People Photography - A guide to taking better pictures. Lonely Planet. ISBN 9781740595414.
- No Cheap Shots. 2006.
- Coyne, Michael (2006). Michael Coyne / [text & photographs Michael Coyne.] WriteLight. ISBN 0975245074.
- Coyne, Michael (2007). Numurkah, lakes and roses. McKenzie. ISBN 9780980386509.
- "Village Hearing the Grass Grow". Melbourne, Australia. 2023, ISBN 9780646859002.

=== Books with one other ===
- Langtree, Christine (2006). How to be a Child. Melbourne University Press. ISBN 9780522853070.

=== Books with contributions by Coyne ===
- The Jew called Jesus
- Leamen, Bob (1986). Armageddon : doomsday in our lifetime?. Greenhouse. ISBN 0864360363.
- Smolan, Rick; Cohen, David; Smolan, Leslie (1986). A Day in the life of America. Collins. ISBN 9780002177054. OCLC 13823880.
- War – A South Collection #1 (T&G)
- Browne, Rick (1995). Planet Vegas. Collins. ISBN 978-0002251204.

=== Other selected Contributions to books ===
- 1984 AUSTRALIA, II JC MANAGEMENT Sydney Australia ISBN 0-959131302
- 1984 The Australians Melbourne, Australia ISBN 0-85550-810-8
- 1995 BEYOND Black & White. Portside Editions Melbourne, Australia. ISBN 1875707034
- 1996 Jerusalem: In the Shadow of Heaven, Harper Collins San Francisco, USA. ISBN 0-00-225095-0
- 1997 Black Star: 60 Years of Photojournalism, Konneman. Chicago, USA. ISBN 3895082503
- 2000 24 Hours in the Life of Australia, Random House Sydney, Australia. ISBN 0-091-84190-9
- 1999 New Zealand the Millennium: Abe Books Auckland, New Zealand ISBN 0-473-05964-9
- 2003 A Day in the Life of the United States Armed Forces, Harper Collins San Francisco, USA, ISBN 0-06-054180-6
- 2012 War/Photography: Images of Armed Conflict and Its Aftermath Yale University Press, New Haven, USA ISBN 978-0300177381
- 2020 Paper Tigers, Head On Foundation Sydney, Australia ISBN 978-0648536239

== Awards ==
- 1980 Best Designed Book. Australia. The Oz Factor
- 1985 POY (Pictures of the Year), Iran Under the Ayatollah (Second Place).
- 1985 Overseas Press Club of America, Iran Under the Ayatollah (Citation for Excellence).
- 1997 Best Designed Religious Book of The Year, Australia. Second Spring The Regeneration of the Jesuits.
- 2001: Centenary Medal from the Australian Government in recognition of his contribution to "Australian society and photography"
- 2007 Awarded Honorary Fellowship from the AIPP (Australian Institute of Professional Photography).
- 2010 Chinese Coal Miners Human Rights Award by the FCC Hong Kong.
- 2011 Fellowship from the AIPP (Australian Institute of Professional Photography).
- 2024 Award of Excellence • Photography Book of the Year POY, Pictures of the Year, 2024 University of Missouri

== Collections ==
Coyne's work is held in the following permanent collections:

- 1993 National Museum, Canberra, Australia World of Australians.
- 1995 National Gallery of Victoria, Australia Iran Under the Ayatollah.
- 1997 Society of Jesus, Rome Second Spring the Regeneration of the Jesuits.
- 1997 Society of Jesus, London Second Spring the Regeneration of the Jesuits.
- 2001 National Library, Canberra, Australia Five Ringed Circus.
- 2001 Kodak, Rochester, USA Five Ringed Circus.
- 2003 Society of Jesus, Melbourne, Australia Second Spring the Regeneration of the Jesuits.
- 2007 Tinkler Private Collection, Melbourne, Australia Weddings Portraits & Anniversaries.
- 2007 Museum of Australian Photography, Melbourne, Australia Five Ringed Circus.
- 2012 National Library, Canberra, Australia Numurkah Lakes & Roses.
- 2012 Museum of Fine Arts, Houston, USA Rehabilitation Centre in Tehran, Iran.
- 2017 The Tate Modern England Numurkah Lakes & Roses and Tour of Duty books

== Exhibitions ==
- 1996 A World of Australians National Museum Canberra, Australia.
- 1996 A World of Australians National tour of Australia.
- 1996 Second Spring The Regeneration of the Jesuits Chiara Goya Gallery Melbourne, Australia.
- 2000 Second Spring The Regeneration of the Jesuits Malthouse Theatre Complex Melbourne, Australia.2001
- 2000 Seeking the Truth Fringe Club Gallery Hong Kong.
- 2001 Tour of Duty Gasworks Complex Melbourne, Australia
- 2001 Mont Blanc Gallery, Hong Kong, 2001. The exhibition also included a lecture on photjournalism and a performance of "Second Spring".
- 2005 Their Story is My Story, Daylesford Foto Biennelle, 2005, featured 30 of Coyne's images, with more than 100 also being presented on screen.
- 2006 Five Ringed Circus View Street Gallery Bendigo, Australia.
- 2006 Five Ringed Circus Monash Gallery of Art Melbourne, Australia.
- 2006 Numurkah Lakes & Roses Monash Gallery of Art Melbourne, Australia.
- 2006 Their Story is My Story Tour of Capital cities in Australia.
- 2007 Body of Knowledge 45 Downstairs Melbourne, Australia.
- 2007 Body of Knowledge Frankston Art Centre, Australia.
- 2007 Body of Knowledge Dudley Art Gallery, Bendigo, Australia.
- 2008 Numurkah Lakes & Roses PICA Brisbane, Australia.
- 2008 Body of Knowledge Art Space Wodonga, Australia.
- 2008 Body of Knowledge Performing Arts Centre Geelong, Australia.
- 2008 Second Spring The Regeneration of the Jesuits Museum of Chivilcoy, Argentina.
- 2009 Numurkah Lakes & Roses The Library Numurkah, Australia.
- 2009 Village-Hearing the Grass Grow Fringe Club, Hong Kong.
- 2009 Second Spring The Regeneration of the Jesuits FCC Hong Kong.
- 2009 Embodied in Stone Fringe Club. Hong Kong.
- 2009 Embodied in Stone Fringe Club. Wuyi, China.
- 2010 Body of Knowledge Central TAFE Art Gallery Perth, Australia.
- 2010 Five Ringed Circus Anita Traverso Gallery, Melbourne, Australia.
- 2012 X factor PHOTNET Gallery Melbourne, Australia.
- 2013 PNG Head On Foundation Sydney, Australia.
- 2013 New Guinea on Mobile, Manning Clark House Canberra.
- 2012 Villages – Hearing the Grass Grow, Tafe Sydney Institute of Photography.
- 2022 Insiders & outsiders, Alison Stieven-Taylor, Brian Cassey, Mouneb Taim, Giles Clarke.
- 2014 Body of Knowledge Town Hall Melbourne, Australia.
- 2015 The Weather Is Different A Few Miles Away Magnet Gallery Melbourne, Australia.
- 2016 Hearing the Grass Grow SHOOT Gallery Perth, Australia.
- 2022 Paper Tigers, Delmar Gallery, Victoria Street, Ashfield NSW, Australia.

== Selected Group Exhibitions ==
- 1995 Amnesty Yes Myer Gallery Melbourne, Australia.
- 1996 Planet Vegas National tour of the USA.
- 2003 Day in the Life of the United States Forces National tour of the USA.
- 2000 New Zealand the Millennium National tour of New Zealand.
- 2005 Our Days Are Numbered Foto Biennale Daylesford, Australia.
- 2006 Degree South Powerhouse Brisbane, Australia.
- 2007 Degree South Foto Biennale Daylesford, Australia.
- 2008 Degree South VIVID Canberra, Australia.
- 2008 MAP VIVID Canberra, Australia.
- 2009 Degree South WAR ACP Sydney, Australia.
- 2009 Degree South WAR FotoFreo Freemantle, Australia.
- 2010 Degree South WAR Powerhouse Brisbane, Australia.
- 2012 WAR PHOTOGRAPH: Images of Armed Conflict and its Aftermath, The Museum of Fine Arts Houston, Brooklyn, Los Angeles, Washington. USA.
- 2013 Degree South PEACE MGA Melbourne, Australia.
- 2014 Iran Reportage Festival Sydney, Australia.
- 2019 Paper Tigers Head On Sydney, Australia.
- 2023 Stories from the Picture Press: Black Star The Image Centre Toronto, Canada.
- 2023 Paper Tigers 02 Head On Sydney, Australia.
