= Dangin =

Dangin may refer to:

- Dangin, Western Australia, Australia
- Pascal Dangin (21st century), French digital artist

== See also ==
- Dangin-dong
- Thureau-Dangin (disambiguation)
