= Mapo Saebit Culture Forest =

Park in Seoul, South Korea

Coordinates: 37°32′39″N 126°55′08″E

Mapo Saebit Culture Forest (Korean: 마포새빛문화숲) is a neighborhood park located in Dangin-dong, Mapo District, Seoul, South Korea.

== History ==
The park traces its origins to a railway line constructed to transport anthracite coal from Danginri Power Plant, the first power plant in Korea. This line, a branch of the Yongsan Line, connected Seogang Station to Danginri Station and was completed in 1929. The railway operated a two-car train, providing both passenger services and anthracite freight transport.

Even after its closure, the Danginri Power Plant remained in place and continued to operate, and in 2018, efforts were made to proceed with undergrounding. The area that was created above ground during this undergrounding process is now the current park.

== Features ==
The Mangwon Hangang Park, a poplar riverside park along the Han River is located nearby.

On December 16, 2022, it was connected to Mangwon Hangang Park through a pedestrian walkway and elevator.

The park is located adjacent to Gangbyeonbuk-ro, a major expressway. This location offers scenic views combining the Han River, Gangbyeonbuk-ro, and Yeouido, creating a picturesque landscape. Depending on the vantage point, the National Assembly Building is visible, and from slightly higher elevations, the iconic 63 Building can also be seen.
