= War Against Smallpox =

Book by Michael Bennett

War Against Smallpox: Edward Jenner and the Global Spread of Vaccination
- Cover
- Author: Michael J. Bennett
- Language: English
- Subject: History of medicine, smallpox vaccination
- Publisher: Cambridge University Press
- Publication date: May 22, 2020
- Publication place: United Kingdom
- Pages: 434
- ISBN: 978-0521765671

War Against Smallpox: Edward Jenner and the Global Spread of Vaccination is a 2020 book by historian and academic Michael J. Bennett. It describes "the devastating and disfiguring impact of smallpox still at large "in the shrinking eighteenth-century globe." It shows how increasing recourse to smallpox inoculation, a risky procedure, prompted Edward Jenner's early experimentation with cowpox as a prophylaxis for smallpox.

== Overview ==
The book offers a comprehensive account of how Jenner's cowpox inoculation, renamed vaccination in England in 1800, spread rapidly around the world during the Napoleonic Wars. It tracks the spread of both the idea of vaccination and the vaccine matter itself through Britain, France and Italy, Germany and northern Europe, the Iberian Peninsula, the Russian Empire, South Asia, North America, Latin America, and Oceania. It explores the role of individuals, medical networks, charitable institutions, government agencies and empires in adopting, promoting and entrenching (sometimes mandating) the practice and the conditions of success and setbacks. A major problem was securing vaccine and maintaining a local supply by drawing lymph from the pocks on recently vaccinated children to use on others. By this means, the Spanish imperial vaccine expedition used orphan children to carry the vaccine across the Atlantic to South America and then across the Pacific. The spread of vaccination involved large-scale mobilisation with doctors and lay champions of the practice, with elite women to the fore, and millions of parents and children. While acknowledging material interests, the book argues that the promotion of vaccination was fundamentally a humanitarian endeavour and discusses the early celebration of Jenner as a new sort of hero. It highlights the international nature of the battle against smallpox, transcending political regimes and borders and establishing vaccination as a universal medical practice.

== Critical reception ==
In her review, Elena Conis (Note: of The University of California, Berkeley) presents the book as an "exhaustive, ambitious, and comprehensive work that promises to be a useful starting point for the many historical inquiries into vaccination that our present moment is likely to inspire."

For Kristin Brig, (Note: of Johns Hopkins University) it "provides a notable contribution to the historiography of vaccination, uniting known narratives to more obscure histories to craft an accomplished and comprehensive global history of early smallpox vaccination."

Peter Hobbins (Note: of the University of Sydney) describes it as a stunning tour de force of deeply sustained scholarship, acknowledging "an extraordinary range of actors, performances, cosmologies and complexities. What drew them together across a contracting world was the allure of salvation in a pandemic epoch."
