= Photograph manipulation =

Transformation or alteration of a photograph

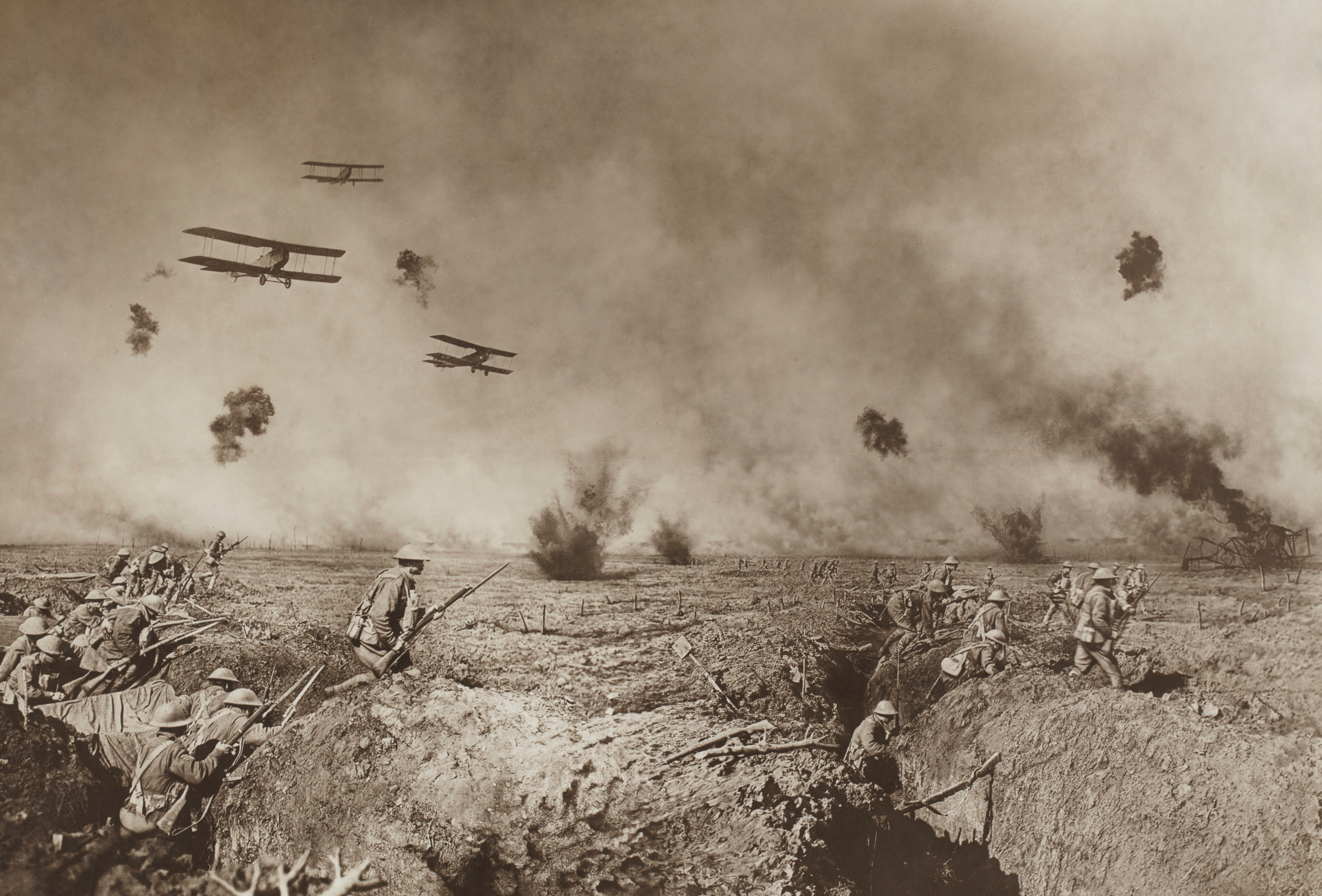
Australian photographer Frank Hurley formed this composite photograph from three negatives of World War I in Belgium, arguing to his superiors that war was conducted on such a vast scale that it was impossible to capture its essence in a single negative.

Photograph manipulation or photograph alteration is the modification of an otherwise genuine photograph. Some photograph manipulations are considered to be skillful artwork, while others are considered to be unethical practices, especially when used to deceive. Motives for manipulating photographs include political propaganda, altering the appearance of a subject (both for better and for worse), entertainment and humor.

Depending on the application and intent, some photograph manipulations are considered an art form because they involve creation of unique images and in some instances, signature expressions of art by photographic artists. For example, Ansel Adams used darkroom exposure techniques to darken and lighten photographs. Other techniques include retouching using ink or paint, airbrushing, double exposure, piecing photos or negatives together in the darkroom, and scratching instant films. Software for digital image manipulation ranges from casual to professional skillsets. One of these, Adobe Photoshop, has led to the use of the term photoshop, meaning to digitally edit an image with any program.

== History and techniques ==
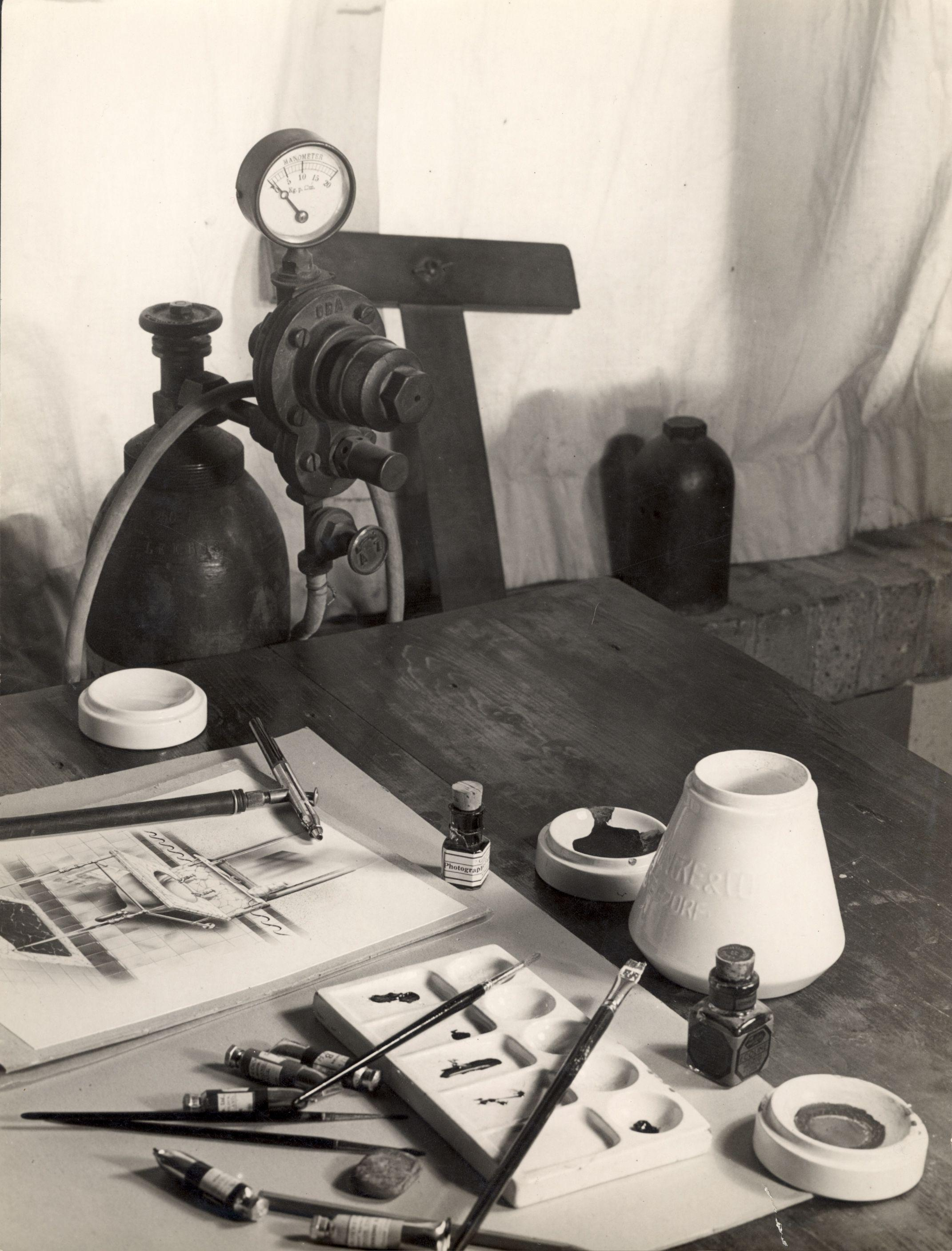
Early retouching tools: gouache paint, kneaded erasers, charcoal sticks, and an airbrush (giving rise to the phrase "airbrushed from history")

Photo manipulation dates back to some of the earliest photographs captured on glass and tin plates during the 19th century. The practice began not long after the creation of the first photograph (1825) by Joseph Nicéphore Niépce who developed heliography and made the first photographic print from a photoengraved printing plate. Traditional photographic prints can be altered using various methods and techniques that involve manipulation directly to the print, such as retouching with ink, paint, airbrushing, or scratching Polaroids during developing (Polaroid art). Negatives can be manipulated while still in the camera using double-exposure techniques, or in the darkroom by piecing photos or negatives together. Some darkroom manipulations involved techniques such as bleaching to artfully lighten or totally wash out parts of the photograph, hand coloring for aesthetic purposes, or mimicking a fine art painting.

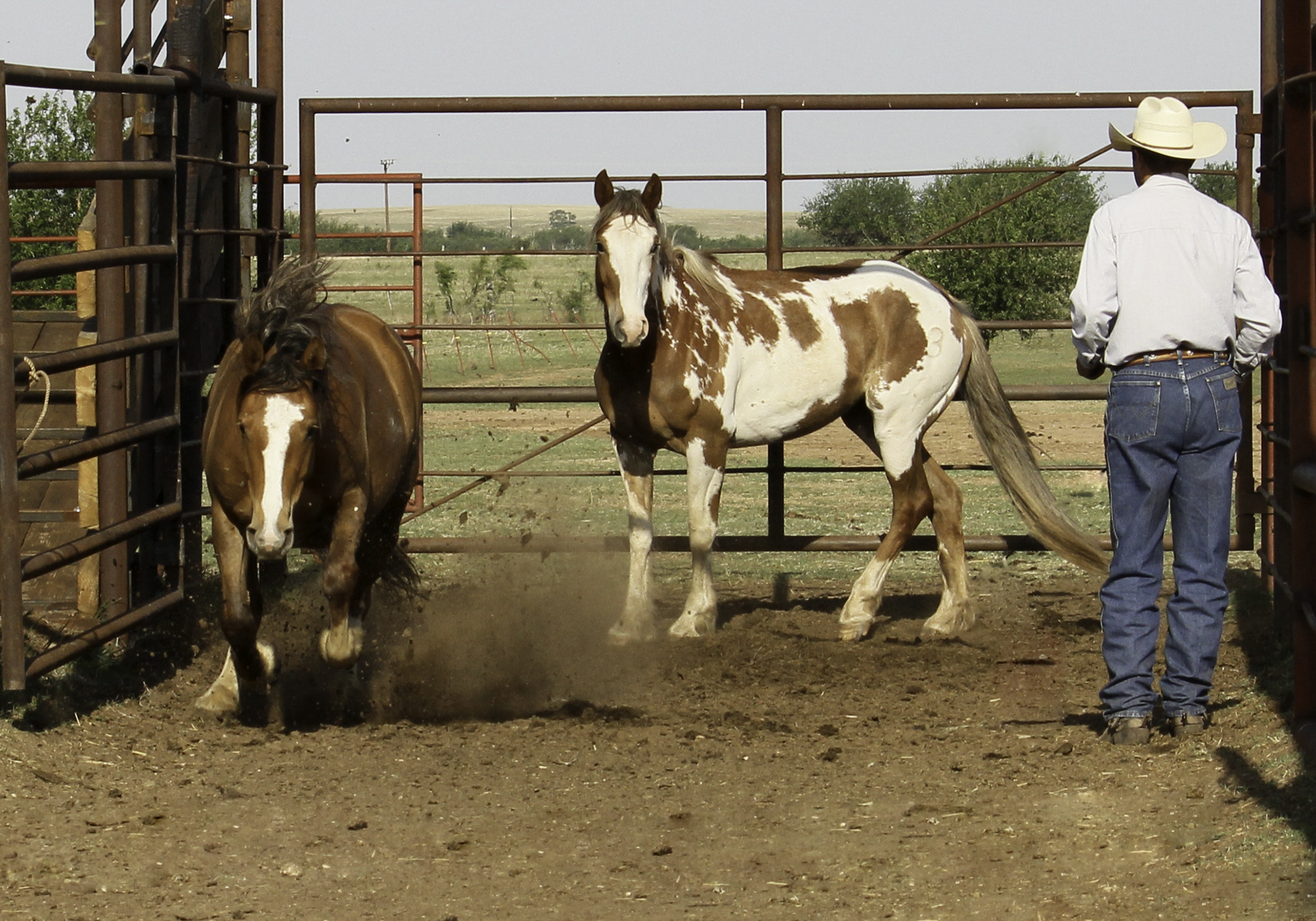
Original photograph of horses in a corral

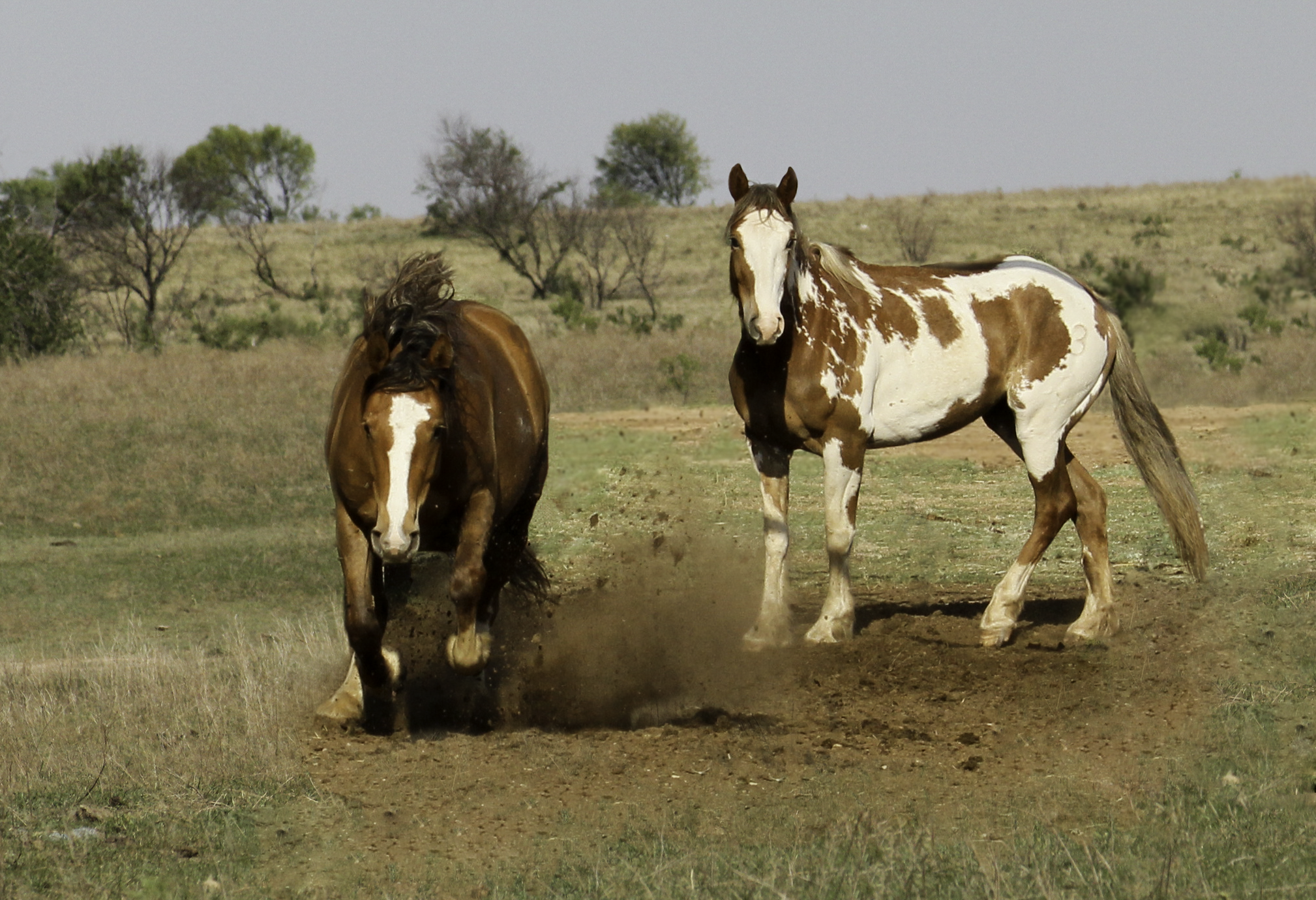
The horses are digitally composited into a photograph of a pasture.

In the early 19th century, photography and the technology that made it possible were rather crude and cumbersome. While the equipment and technology progressed over time, it was not until the late 20th century that photography evolved into the digital realm. In the 20th century, digital retouching became available with Quantel computers running Paintbox in professional environments, which, alongside other contemporary packages, were effectively replaced in the market by editing software for graphic imaging, such as Adobe Photoshop and GIMP. At the onset, digital photography was considered by some to be a radical new approach and was initially rejected by photographers because of its substandard quality. The transition from film to digital has been an ongoing process, although much progress was made in the early 21st century as a result of innovations that have greatly improved digital image quality while reducing the bulk and weight of cameras and equipment.

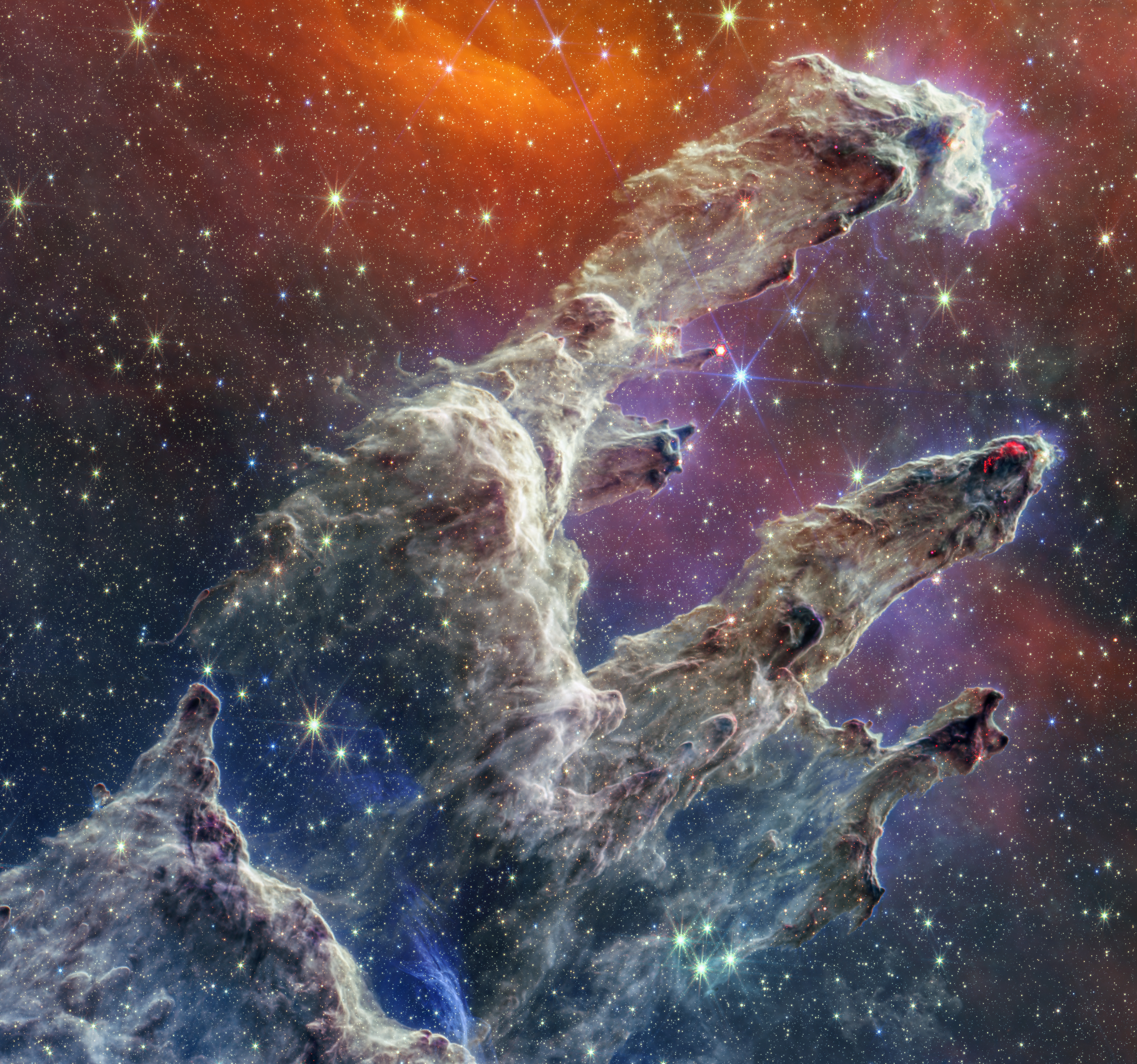
The James Webb Space Telescope returns infrared data, which is then converted into the visible spectrum.

Ansel Adams used darkroom exposure techniques, burning (darkening) and dodging (lightening) a photograph.

Whereas manipulating photographs with tools such as Photoshop and GIMP is generally skill-intensive and time-consuming, the 21st century has seen the arrival of image editing software powered by advanced algorithms which allow complex transformations to be mostly automated. For example, beauty filters which smooth skin tone and create more visually pleasing facial proportions (for example, by enlarging a subject's eyes) are available within a number of widely used social media apps such as Instagram and TikTok, and can be applied in real-time to live video. Such features are also available in dedicated image editing mobile applications like Facetune. Some, such as FaceApp use deep-learning algorithms to automate complex, content-aware transformations, such as changing the age or gender of the subject of a photo, or modifying their facial expression.

The term deepfake was coined in 2017 to refer to real images and videos generated with deep-learning techniques. The alterations can be created for entertainment purposes, or more nefarious purposes such as spreading disinformation. Fraudulent creations can be used to conduct malicious attacks, political gains, financial crime, or fraud. More recently, deep fakes superimposing the faces of celebrities and other persons onto those of pornographic performers for the purpose of creating pornographic material has become prevalent; deepfake pornography has been criticized due to issues with lack of consent.

Raw astronomical images of celestial objects are usually generated from data provided by complex digital cameras. Raw images include binary (black-and-white) or grayscale data generated in response to infrared or ultraviolet or other energy lying outside the visible light spectrum—requiring people to make technical decisions for how to transform the raw digital data into colorized pictures for human viewing. For example, in images from the James Webb Space Telescope and Hubble Space Telescope, the usual transformation is to use blue for the shortest wavelengths, red for the longest wavelengths, and green for intermediate wavelengths. Both scientific accuracy and visual appeal contribute to the decisions, for both enabling accurate analysis by scientists and providing visual interest for the public. Also, science visualization specialists sometimes stack images together, stitch observations from different instruments, enhance contrast, and remove artifacts.

== Political and ethical issues ==
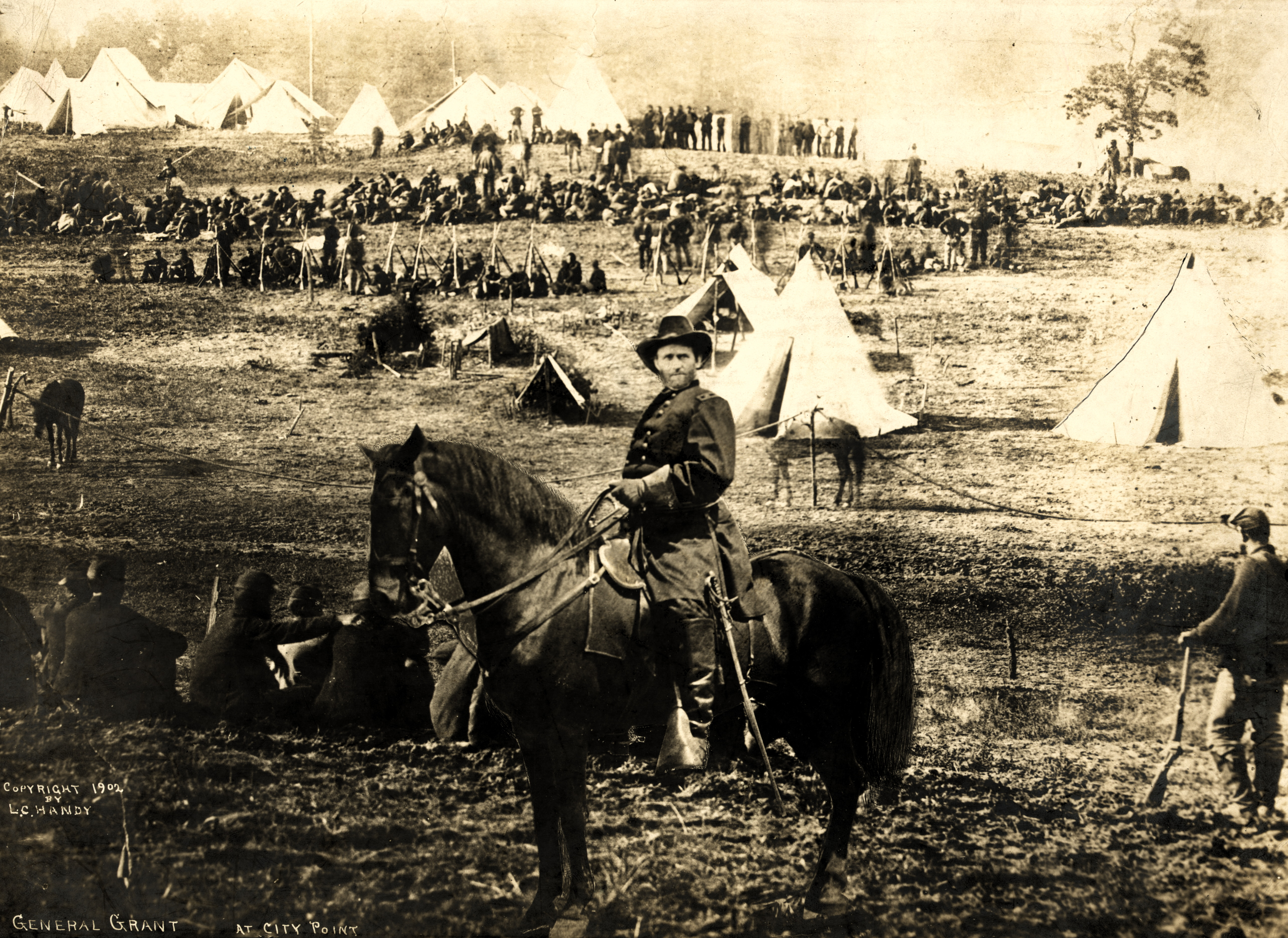
General Grant at City Point is a composite of three different photographs.

Photo manipulation has been used to deceive or persuade viewers or improve storytelling and self-expression. An 1852 engraving of United States politician John C. Calhoun was later manipulated to incorporate the head of U.S. president Abraham Lincoln; this was not discovered for almost a century, when photojournalist Stefan Lorant noticed that Lincoln's mole was on the wrong side of his face. As early as the American Civil War, multiple photograph negatives were published as single engravings.

A photograph by Heinrich Hoffmann was manipulated to show Adolf Hitler celebrating the outbreak of World War I in Munich.

Joseph Stalin made use of photo retouching for propaganda purposes. On May 5, 1920, his predecessor Vladimir Lenin held a speech for Soviet troops that Leon Trotsky attended. Stalin had Trotsky retouched out of a photograph showing Trotsky in attendance. In a well-known case of damnatio memoriae ("condemnation of memory") image manipulation, NKVD leader Nikolai Yezhov, after his execution in 1940, was removed from an official press photo where he was pictured with Stalin; historians subsequently nicknaming him the "Vanishing Commissar". Such censorship of images in the Soviet Union was common.

The pioneer among journalists distorting photographic images for news value was Bernarr Macfadden; in the mid-1920s, his "composograph" process involved reenacting real news events with costumed body doubles and then photographing the dramatized scenes—then pasting faces of the real news-personalities (gathered from unrelated photos) onto his staged images.

A photograph by Adolf Hitler's official photographer Heinrich Hoffmann, first published in the often-deceptive Nazi propaganda magazine Illustrated Observer (1926–1945), was manipulated to show Hitler celebrating the outbreak of World War I in Munich. In the 1930s, German artist John Heartfield used a type of photo manipulation known as the photomontage to critique Nazi propaganda.

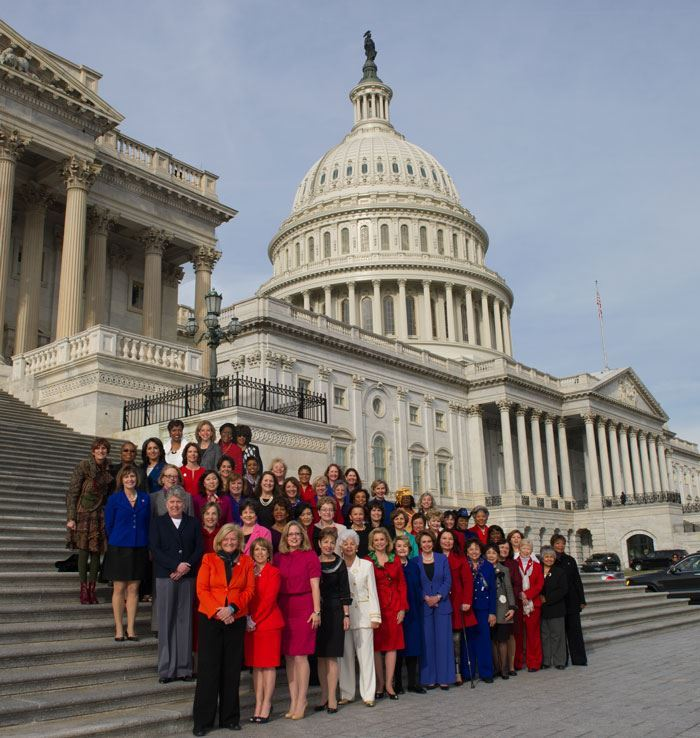
Before its release to news media, four congressional staff members absent during a photoshoot were digitally added into this 2013 official portrait.

Some ethical theories have been applied to image manipulation. During a panel on the topic of ethics in image manipulation Aude Oliva theorized that categorical shifts are necessary in order for an edited image to be viewed as a manipulation. In Image Act Theory, Carson Reynolds extended speech act theory by applying it to photo editing and image manipulations. In "How to Do Things with Pictures", William J. Mitchell details the long history of photo manipulation and discusses it critically.

Photo manipulation is largely considered a useful tool in modern political campaigning and photo manipulations are oftentimes used to amplify political messages and undermine political opponents. For example, on January 6, 2020, US Rep. Paul Gosar (R-Ariz.) tweeted a photo of US President Barack Obama shaking hands with Iranian President Hassan Rouhani, with the caption "The world is a better place without these guys in power." It was pointed out that this meeting never took place and in reality was a doctored photo of a meeting between President Obama and Indian Prime Minister Manmohan Singh. Gosar was criticized for attempting to spread disinformation. The photo had also been previously used in a 2015 advert for Senator Ron Johnson.

In 2023, the organizers of Dublin Pride were accused of "intentionally doctoring photos" to push "propaganda" when they posted an altered image from a 1983 protest, in which the slogan "Trans rights are human rights" was added to a sign carried by a demonstrator. A spokesman for Dublin Pride defended the change, saying that the "practice of altering iconic images for campaigns is a common practice". The altered image was ultimately removed from the Dublin Pride website.

=== Use in journalism ===
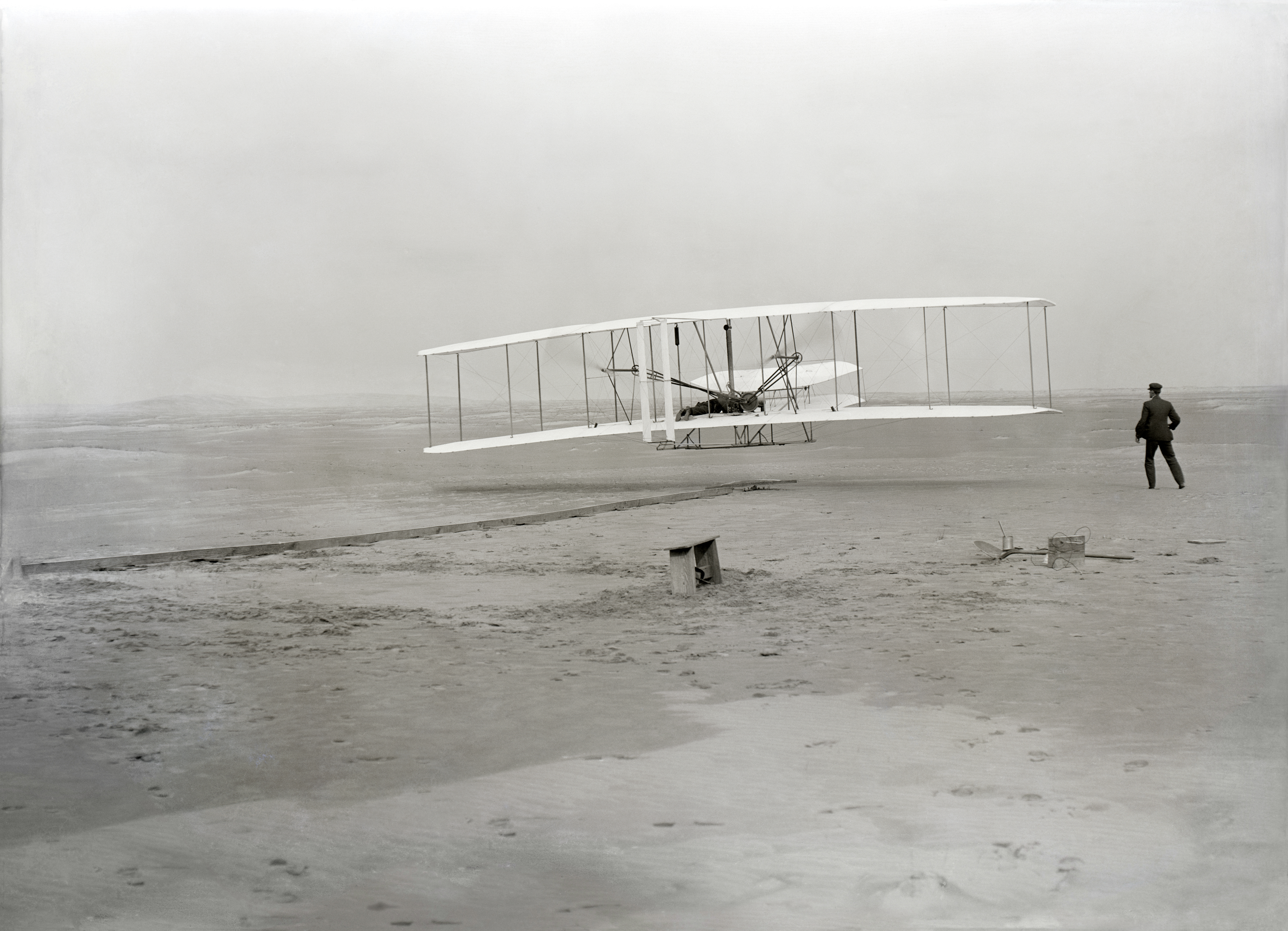
1903 achromatic photo of the Wright Flyer

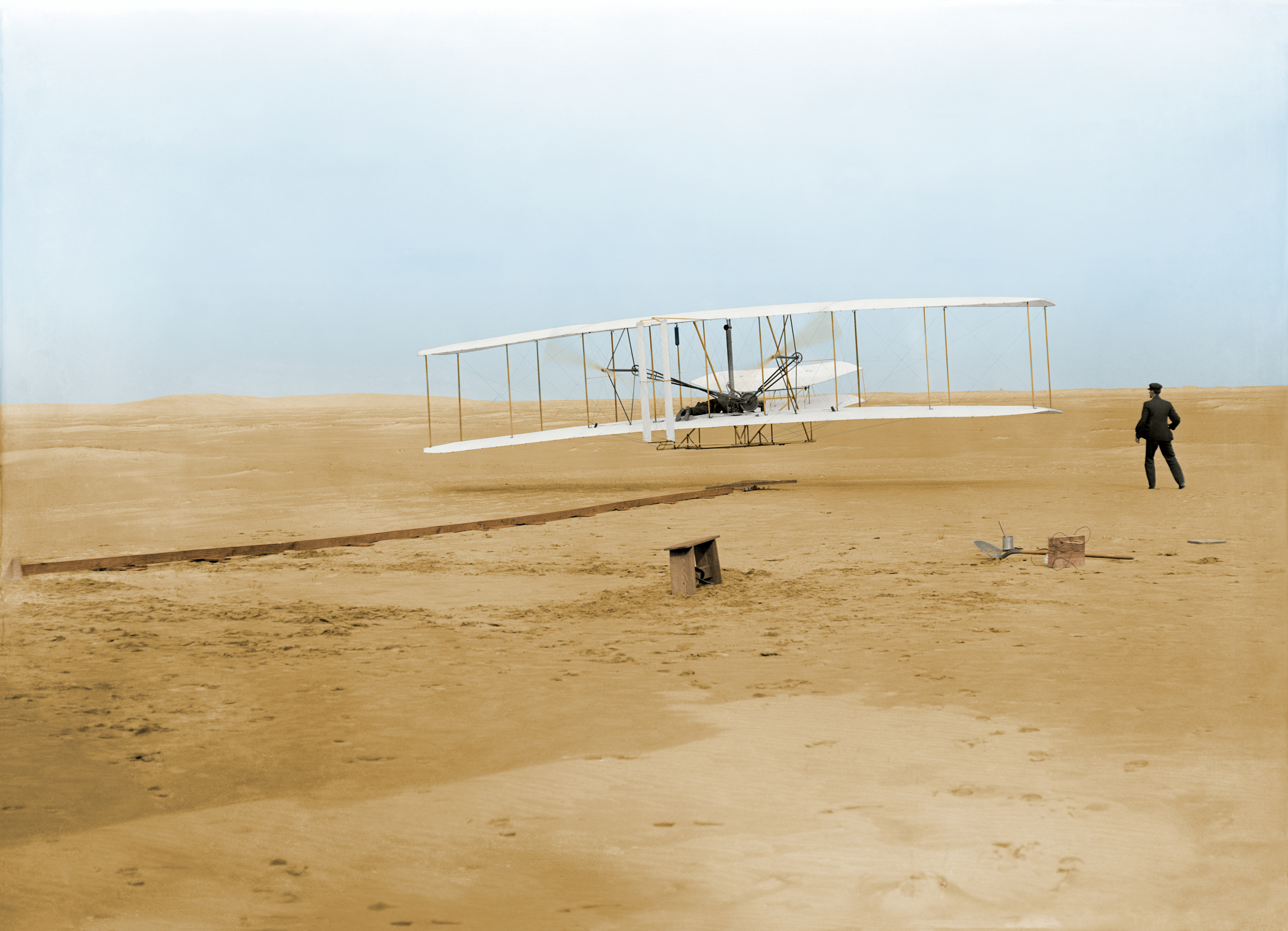
A 2021 colorized version

A notable controversy was the alteration of a photograph to fit the vertical orientation of a 1982 National Geographic magazine cover. The altered image made two Egyptian pyramids appear closer together than they were in the original photograph. The incident triggered a debate about the appropriateness of falsifying an image, and raised questions regarding the magazine's credibility. Shortly after the incident, Tom Kennedy, director of photography for National Geographic stated, "We no longer use that technology to manipulate elements in a photo simply to achieve a more compelling graphic effect. We regarded that afterward as a mistake, and we wouldn't repeat that mistake today."

There are other incidents of questionable photo manipulation in journalism. One such incident occurred in early 2005 after Martha Stewart was released from prison. Newsweek used a photograph of Stewart's face on the body of a much slimmer woman for their cover, suggesting that Stewart had lost weight while in prison. Speaking about the incident in an interview, Lynn Staley, assistant managing editor at Newsweek said, "The piece that we commissioned was intended to show Martha as she would be, not necessarily as she is." Staley also explained that Newsweek disclosed on page 3 that the cover image of Martha Stewart was a composite.

Image manipulation software has affected the level of trust many viewers once had in the aphorism "the camera never lies". Images may be manipulated for fun, aesthetic reasons, or to improve the appearance of a subject but not all image manipulation is innocuous, as evidenced by the Kerry Fonda 2004 election photo controversy. The image in question was a fraudulent composite image of John Kerry taken on June 13, 1971, and Jane Fonda taken in August 1972 sharing the same platform at a 1971 antiwar rally, the latter of which carried a fake Associated Press credit with the intent to change the public's perspective of reality.

There is a growing body of writings devoted to the ethical use of digital editing in photojournalism. In the United States, for example, the National Press Photographers Association (NPPA) established a Code of Ethics which promotes the accuracy of published images, advising that photographers "do not manipulate images ... that can mislead viewers or misrepresent subjects". Infringements of the Code are taken very seriously, especially regarding digital alteration of published photographs, as evidenced by a case in which Pulitzer Prize-nominated photographer Allan Detrich resigned his post following the revelation that a number of his photographs had been manipulated.

In 2010, a Ukrainian photographer – Stepan Rudik, winner of the 3rd prize story in Sports Features – was disqualified due to violation of the rules of the World Press Photo contest. "After requesting RAW-files of the series from him, it became clear that an element had been removed from one of the original photographs." As of 2015, up to 20% of World Press Photo entries that made it to the penultimate round of the contest were disqualified after they were found to have been manipulated or post-processed with rules violations.

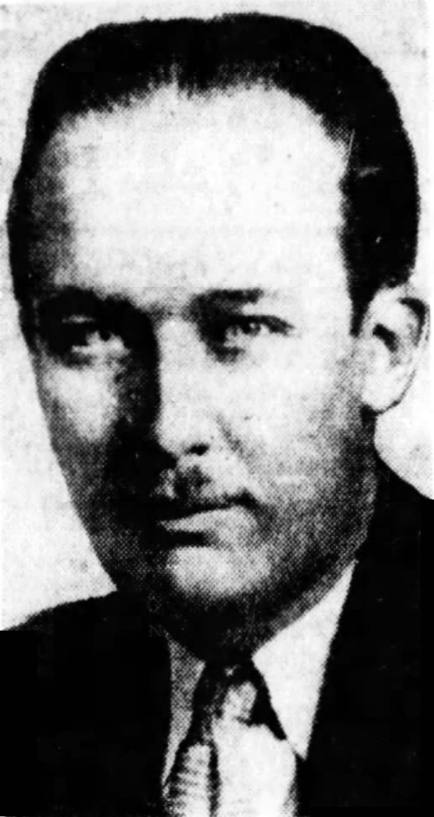
c. 1940

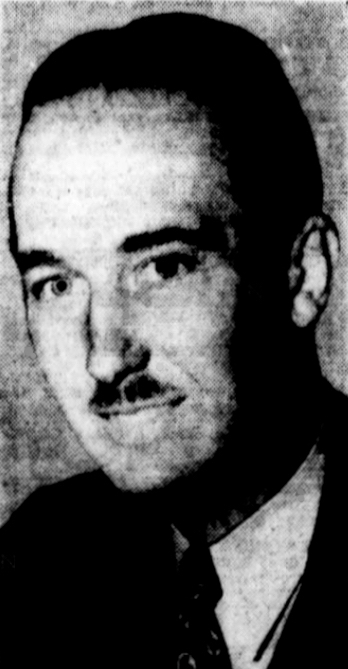
c. 1941

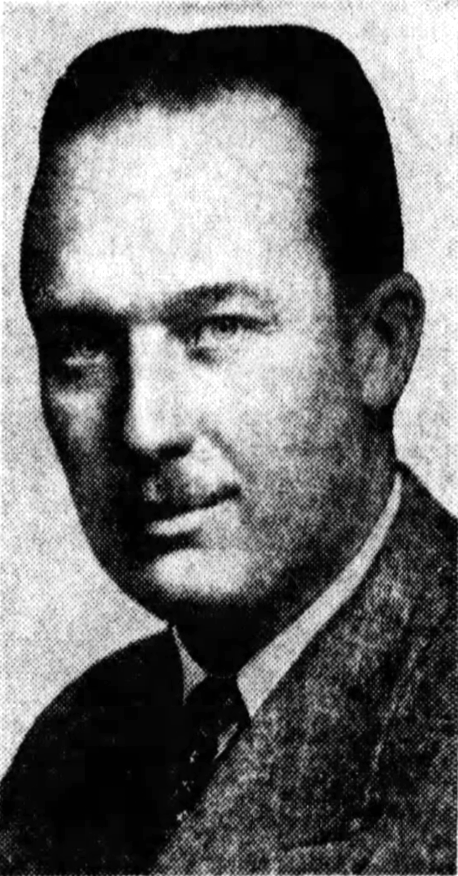
c. 1950

Portraits of U.S. real-estate developer Fred Trump depict him with features out of perspective (1940), with a jagged nose (1941), and traditionally (1950).

== Retouching human subjects ==
A common form of photographic manipulation, particularly in advertising, fashion, boudoir, portrait, and glamour photography, involves edits intended to enhance the appearance of the subject. Common transformations include smoothing skin texture, erasing scars, pimples, and other skin blemishes, slimming the subject's body, and erasing wrinkles and folds. Commentators have raised concerns that such practices may lead to unrealistic expectations and negative body image among the audience.

=== Use in fashion ===
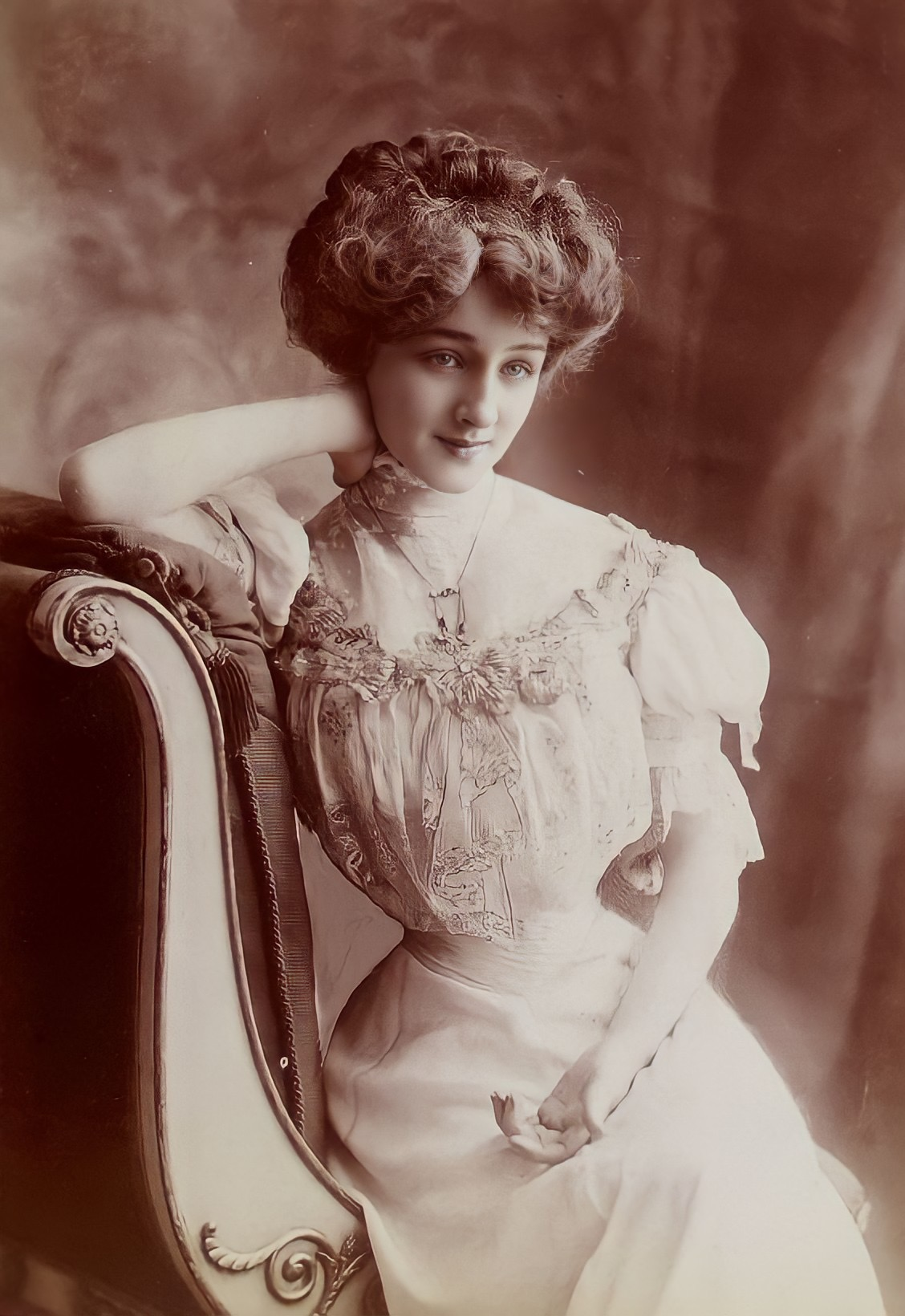
Around the late Victorian era, the waists of women were masked out to achieve more of an hourglass figure.

In glamour photography, retouching is done to remove wrinkles and alter proportions, not only to make models appear skinner but also the reverse. According to some professionals, if a photograph is not labeled as "not retouched", then it can be assumed that it has been. According to one retoucher, the industry's goal is to profit regardless of promoting unrealistic body images.

Starting in 2012, Seventeen magazine said they intended to no longer manipulate photos of their models. The decision was made after a 14-year-old girl, Julia Bluhm, petitioned for the magazine to use a minimum of one unaltered photo in each of their spread per issue; the petition received over 84,000 signatures.

=== On social media ===
Social media apps such as Snapchat, Instagram, and TikTok enable users to manipulate photos using the back or front camera, applying pre-made filters to enhance the quality of the picture, distort themselves, or add creative elements such as text, coloring or stickers. Filters provided on social media platforms are made by social media companies or are user-generated content. Photo editing techniques include the addition of polls, GIFs, music, countdowns, donations, and links. Influencers use filters to grow engagement and boost follower activity, in order to be seen as unique, creative, or fascinating. Meta reported that over 600 million people have used an AR effect on Facebook or Instagram.

Mobile phone applications such as Facetune allow users to modify their own personal images. Social media users, especially younger people, are thus exposed to an extreme amount of manipulated imagery presenting unrealistic, unachievable body ideals. For example, social media platforms such as TikTok have include filters that create an illusion of physical attributes, such as the "skinny filter" and the "perfect skin filter". Part of the idea of perfection on social media comes from Japanese culture and the word "kawaii", which translates to an overall aspect of cuteness; exerting fragile, girly, and childlike emotions. Kawaii-enhanced photos present a perception of perfection in a photo booth setting. This notion catalyzed the first selfie phone camera by Kyocera in 1999, which led to the posting of selfies during the beginnings of MySpace in the early 2000s.

=== In advertising ===
Photo manipulation has been used in advertisements for television commercials and magazines to make their products or the person look better and more appealing than how they look in reality. Additionally, subjects may be altered to achieve a desired composition by cheating anatomy and/or perspective to achieve a more desirable silhouette or direct the eye to particular elements. (Note: For example, the Han Solo character poster for Star Wars: The Force Awakens (2015) depicts his right face expanded almost to a front-facing perspective, while the left side is at somewhat of a three-quarter view.)

=== Celebrity opposition ===
Photo manipulation has triggered negative responses from both viewers and celebrities. This has led to celebrities refusing to have their photos retouched in support of the American Medical Association that has decided that "[we] must stop exposing impressionable children and teenagers to advertisements portraying models with body types only attainable with the help of photo editing software". These include Keira Knightley, Brad Pitt, Andy Roddick, Jessica Simpson, Lady Gaga, and Zendaya.

Brad Pitt had a photographer, Chuck Close, take photos of him that emphasized his flaws. Chuck Close is known for his photos that emphasize the skin flaws of an individual. Pitt did so in an effort to speak out against media using image manipulation software and manipulating celebrities' photos in an attempt to hide their flaws. Kate Winslet spoke out against photo manipulation in media after GQ magazine altered her body, making it look unnaturally thin. 42-year-old Cate Blanchett appeared on the cover of Intelligent Life's 2012 March/April issue, makeup-free and without digital retouching for the first time.

In April 2010, Britney Spears agreed to release "un-airbrushed images of herself next to the digitally altered ones". The fundamental motive behind her move was to "highlight the pressure exerted on women to look perfect". In 2014, Hungarian pop vocalist and songwriter Boggie produced two music videos that achieved global attention for its stance on whitewashing in the beauty industry: the #1 MAHASZ chart hit "Parfüm" (Hungarian version) and "Nouveau Parfum" (French version) from her self-titled album Boggie, which reached two Billboard charts (#3 Jazz Album, #17 World Music Album). In the videos, the artist is shown singing as she is extensively retouched in real-time, ending with a side-by-side comparison of her natural and manipulated images as the song fades out.

=== Corporate opposition ===
Some companies have begun to speak out against photo manipulation in advertising their products. Dove created the Dove Self-Esteem Fund and the Dove Campaign for Real Beauty to build confidence in young women, emphasizing "real beauty", or unretouched photographs, in the media. Clothing retailer Aerie's campaign #AerieREAL emphasizes that their clothes are for everyone and that their advertisements have not been retouched in any way, saying "The real you is sexy."

The American Medical Association stated that it is opposed to the use of photo manipulation. Dr. McAneny made a statement that altering models to such extremes creates unrealistic expectations in children and teenagers regarding body image. He also said that the practice of digitally altering the weight of models in photographs should be stopped, so that children and teenagers are not exposed to body types that cannot be attained in reality. The American Medical Association as a whole adopted a policy to work with advertisers to work on setting up guidelines for advertisements to try to limit how much digital image manipulation is used. The goal of this policy is to limit the number of unrealistic expectations for body image in advertisements.

=== Government opposition ===
Governments are exerting pressure on advertisers, and are starting to ban photos that are too airbrushed and edited. In the United Kingdom, the Advertising Standards Authority has banned an advertisement by Lancôme featuring Julia Roberts for being misleading, stating that the flawless skin seen in the photo was too good to be true. The US is also moving in the direction of banning excessive photo manipulation where a CoverGirl model's ad was banned because it had exaggerated effects, leading to a misleading representation of the product.

In 2015, France proceeded to pass a law that battles against the use of unrealistic body images and anorexia in the fashion industry. This includes modeling and photography. The models now have to show they are healthy and have a BMI of over 18 through a note from their doctor. Employers breaking this law will be fined and can serve a jail sentence of up to six months. When a creator of a photograph does not disclose that the picture is edited or retouched, no matter how small the edit, they may also receive a fine or 30% of the costs of what they used to create their ad.

In 2021, Norway enacted legislation making it a requirement to label digital manipulations of the bodies of persons when depicted in advertising. Failure to do so is punishable by a fine.

=== Support ===
Some editors of magazine companies do not view manipulating their cover models as an issue. In an interview with the editor of the French magazine Marie Claire, she stated that their readers are not idiots and that they can tell when a model has been retouched. Also, some who support photo manipulation in the media state that the altered photographs are not the issue, but that it is the expectations that viewers have that they fail to meet, such as wanting to have the same body as a celebrity on the cover of their favorite magazine.

=== Opinion polling ===
A survey done by the United Kingdom-based fashion store New Look showed that 90% of the individuals surveyed would prefer seeing a wider variety of body shapes in media. This would involve them wanting to see cover models that are not all thin, but some with more curves than others. The survey also talked about how readers view the use of photo manipulation. One statistic stated that 15% of the readers believed that the cover images are accurate depictions of the model in reality. Also, they found that 33% of women who were surveyed are aiming for a body that is impossible for them to attain.

Dove and People Weekly also did a survey to see how photo manipulation affects the self-esteem of females. In doing this, they found that 80% of the women surveyed felt insecure when seeing photos of celebrities in the media. Of the women surveyed who had lower self-esteem, 70% of them do not believe that their appearance is pretty or stylish enough in comparison to cover models.

=== Social and cultural implications ===
The growing popularity of image manipulation has raised concern as to whether it allows for unrealistic images to be portrayed to the public. In her article "On Photography" (1977), Susan Sontag discusses the objectivity, or lack thereof, in photography, concluding that "photographs, which fiddle with the scale of the world, themselves get reduced, blown up, cropped, retouched, doctored and tricked out". A practice widely used in the magazine industry, the use of photo manipulation on an already subjective photograph creates a constructed reality for the individual and it can become difficult to differentiate fact from fiction. With the potential to alter body image, debate continues as to whether manipulated images, particularly those in magazines, contribute to self-esteem issues in both men and women.

In today's world, photo manipulation has a positive impact by developing the creativity of one's mind or maybe a negative one by removing the art and beauty of capturing something so magnificent and natural or the way it should be. According to The Huffington Post, "Photoshopping and airbrushing, many believe, are now an inherent part of the beauty industry, as are makeup, lighting and styling". In a way, these image alterations are "selling" actual people to the masses to affect responses, reactions, and emotions toward these cultural icons.

== "Photoshop" as a verb ==
The terms "photoshop", "photoshopped" and "photoshopping", derived from Adobe Photoshop, are ubiquitous and widely used colloquially and academically when referencing image editing software as it relates to digital manipulation and alteration of photographs. The term commonly refers to digital editing of photographs, regardless of which software program is used.

Trademark owner Adobe Inc. objects to what they refer to as misuse of their trademarked software name, and consider it an infringement on their trademark to use terms such as "photoshopped" or "photoshopping" as a noun or verb, in possessive form or as a slang term, to prevent "genericization" or "genericide" of the company's trademark. Separately, the Free Software Foundation advises against using "photoshop" as a verb because Adobe Photoshop is proprietary software.

In popular culture, the term photoshopping is sometimes associated with montages in the form of visual jokes, such as those published on Fark and in Mad magazine. Images may be propagated memetically as humor or passed as actual news in the form of a hoax. An example of the latter category is "Helicopter Shark", which was widely circulated as a so-called "National Geographic Photo of the Year" and was later revealed to be a hoax. Photoshop contests are games organized online with the goal of creating humorous images around a theme.

== Gallery ==
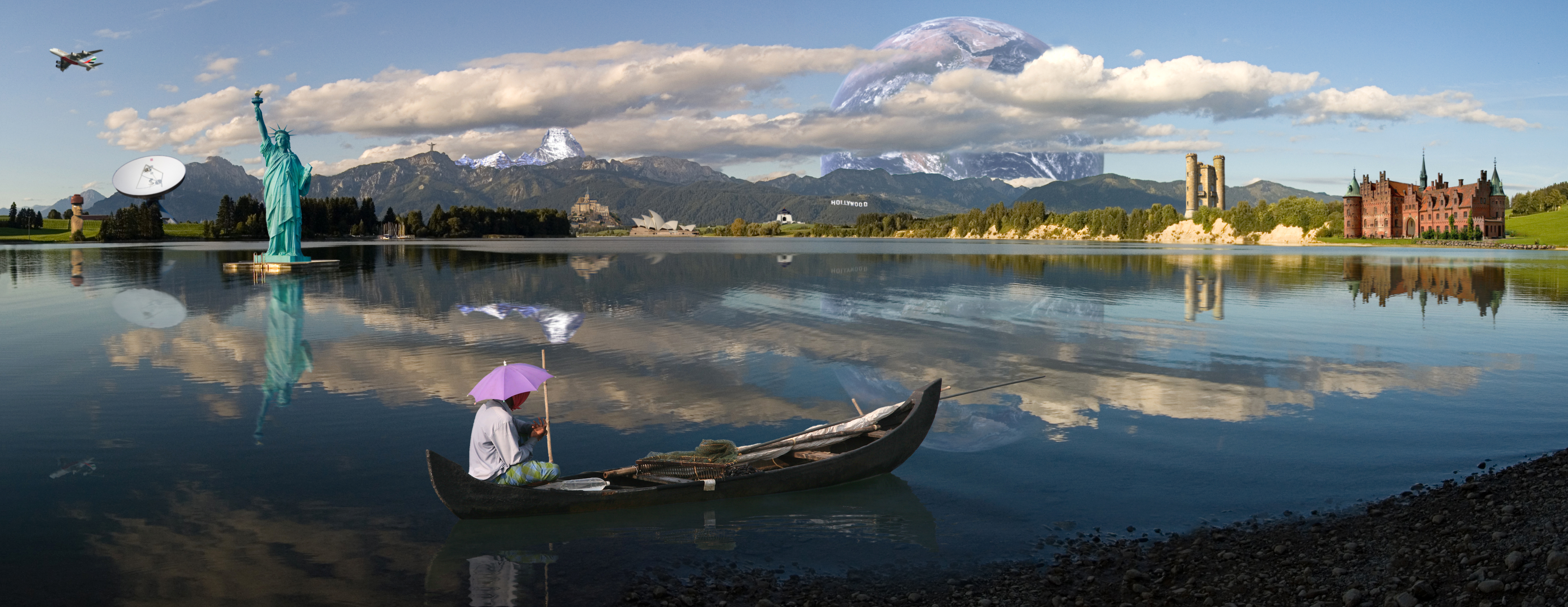
Photomontage of 16 photos which have been digitally manipulated in Photoshop to give the impression that it is a real landscape

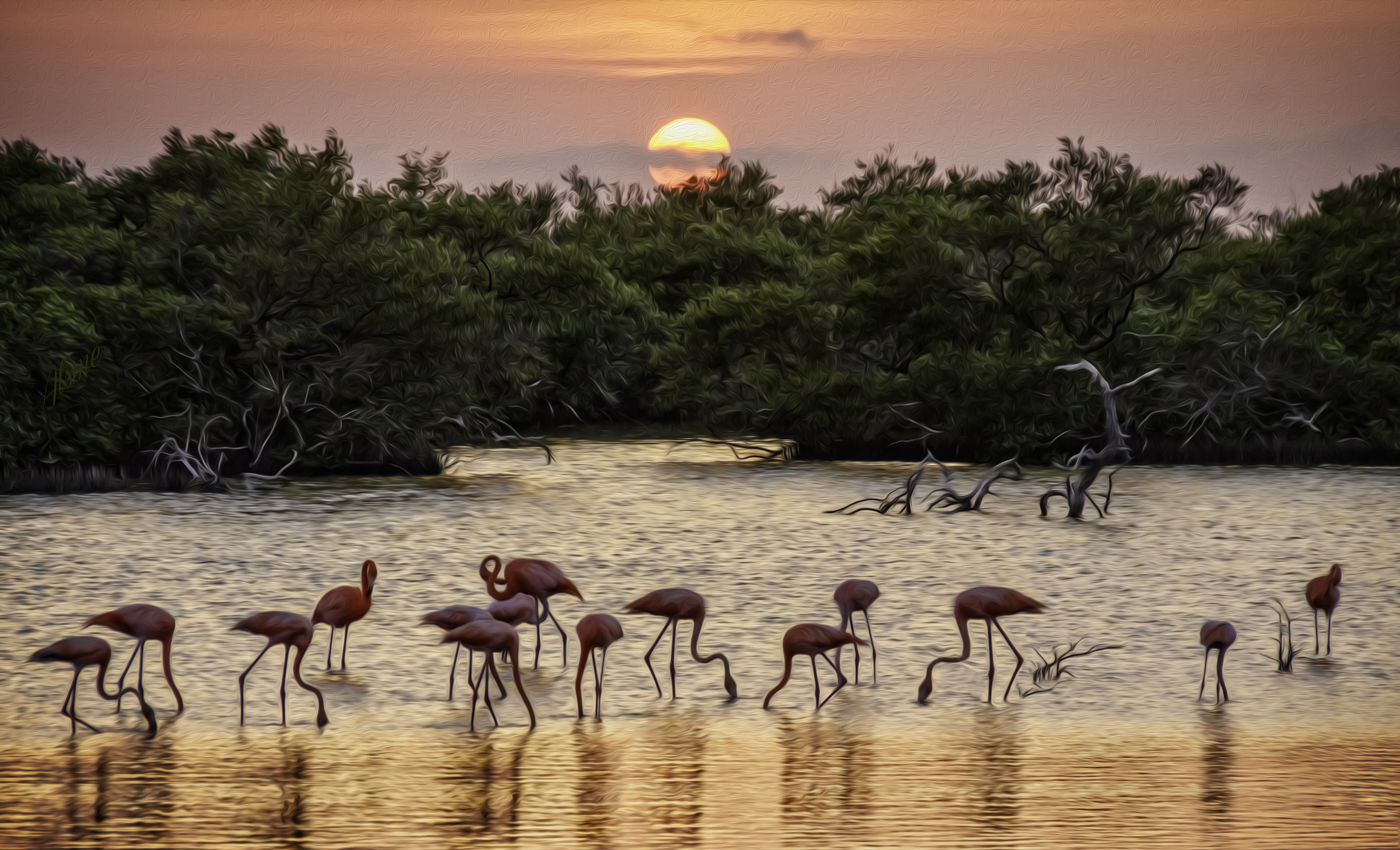
Photograph manipulated in Photoshop to give the impression it is a painting with brush strokes

== See also ==
- List of photograph manipulation incidents
- Artificial intelligence visual art
- Derivative work
- Error level analysis
- Masking (art)
- Pascal Dangin
- Source criticism
- Straight photography
- SurfSafe, browser extension for detecting altered images
- Truth claim (photography)
- Whitewashing (beauty)
