= UC Berkeley Graduate School of Journalism =

Graduate professional school of the University of California, Berkeley

University of California, Berkeley Graduate School of Journalism
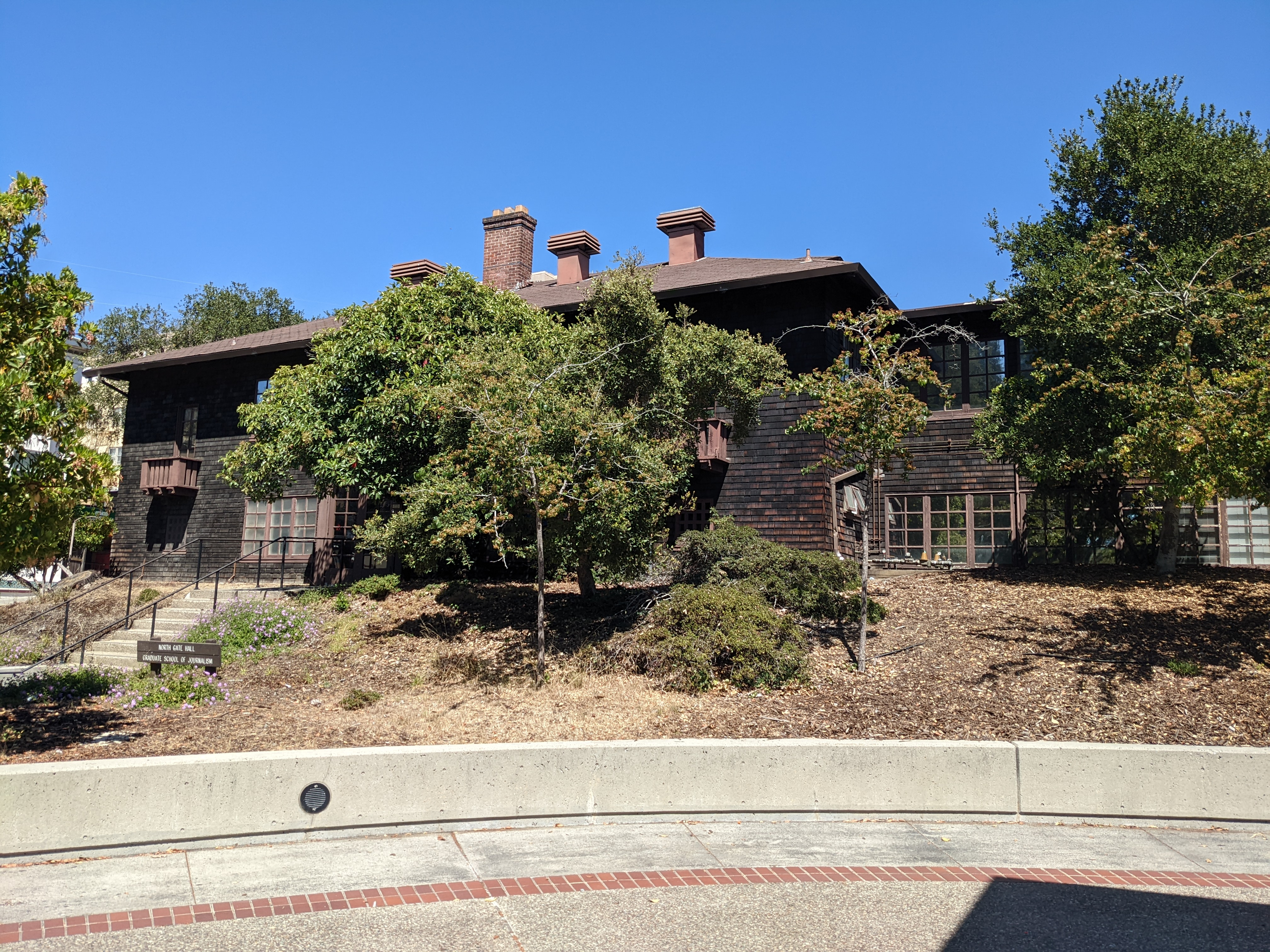
- Type: Public graduate school
- Established: 1967
- Parent institution: University of California, Berkeley
- Dean: Michael Bolden, Dean
- Students: 107 Full Time
- Location: Berkeley, California, U.S. 37°52′29.79″N 122°15′34.05″W
- Website: journalism.berkeley.edu
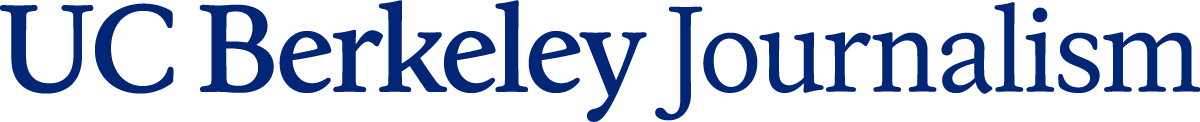

The UC Berkeley Graduate School of Journalism is a graduate professional school on the campus of University of California, Berkeley. It is designed to produce journalists with a two-year Master of Journalism (MJ) degree. It also offers a minor in journalism to undergraduates and a journalism certificate option to non–UC Berkeley students. The school is located in North Gate Hall on the north side of the central campus of UC Berkeley.

The school is currently being served by Dean Michael Bolden, former CEO and executive director of the American Press Institute. Bolden replaced acting dean Elena Conis in August 2025 following a national search.

Most courses offered by the school are on the graduate level as part of its professional Master of Journalism (MJ) degree. The school offers a minor to undergraduates. The school enrolls approximately 120 students; 60 first-year and 60-second-year students, and is among the smaller graduate schools on the campus of UC Berkeley.

== Curriculum ==
The UC Berkeley Graduate School of Journalism focuses on six media platforms of journalism: Audio journalism, Documentary Film, Narrative Writing, Multimedia, and Photojournalism. It is further separated into four reporting interests: Climate Journalism, Data Journalism, Health and Science Journalism, reporting on incarceration, and Investigative Reporting.

The school's focus is on professional practice rather than research, and requires students to perform an internship at a media outlet as a degree requirement between their first and second year of study.

Students are also required to take an introductory news reporting course called J200, where they publish in one of two hyperlocal news websites that are run by the school: Oakland North and Richmond Confidential.

== Permanent faculty ==
- Geeta Anand, former dean, professor of reporting and former Pulitzer Prize-winning foreign correspondent for the New York Times. On permanent leave serving as editor-in-chief of VTDigger.
- Lisa Armstrong, assistant professor and freelance reporter.
- David Barstow, Reva and David Logan Distinguished Professor in Investigative Reporting and four-time New York Times Pulitzer Prize winner.
- Michael Bolden, dean and professor. Former CEO and Executive Director of the American Press Institute (API).
- Elena Conis, professor and former Mellon Fellow in Health and Humanities at Emory University
- Mark Danner, professor and New Yorker writer, author
- Bill Drummond, professor and NPR Morning Edition founding editor
- Jennifer LaFleur, assistant professor joining the faculty in August 2023. She is a former senior editor at the Center for Public Integrity, and former senior editor at Reveal from the Center of Investigative Reporting.
- Ken Light, Reva and David Logan Professor of Photojournalism.
- Shereen Marisol Meraji, assistant professor and former co-host of NPR's Code Switch podcast
- Michael Pollan, Emeritus Professor of the Graduate School, notable author on food topics
- Jeremy Sanchez Rue, associate dean and associate professor of practice.
- Jason Spingarn-Koff, professor of climate change and former executive at Netflix and New York Times video.
- Edward Wasserman, professor; former professor at Washington and Lee University

== In the news ==
In 2015, the estate of photographer Jim Marshall created the Jim Marshall Fellowships in Photography at the UC Berkeley Graduate School of Journalism's Center for Photography.

China expert and author Orville Schell served as dean of the school from 1996 to the summer of 2007. Before Schell, Thomas Goldstein served as dean from 1988 until he left to become the dean of Columbia University's Graduate School of Journalism. He stepped down from that position after five years, despite being credited for increasing endowments for that school from $54 million to $84 million over his short stint there. He is currently teaching a news writing class at UC Berkeley's Graduate School of Journalism. Pulitzer Prize-winning American media critic Ben Bagdikian also served as a past dean of the UC Berkeley's Graduate School of Journalism.

In 1981, actress Carol Burnett won a $1.6 million (later reduced to $800,000) libel award from The National Enquirer over an article that she said implied she had been intoxicated in a Washington restaurant. The case, Burnett v. National Enquirer, Inc. reached the California Court of Appeal. She donated a portion of that to the UC Berkeley Graduate School of Journalism saying she hoped the suit would teach aspiring journalists the dangers of defaming individuals in articles. The money was used to fund law and ethics courses.

The UC Berkeley Graduate School of Journalism formed a unique partnership with PBS FRONTLINE to create and sponsor FRONTLINE World (2002-2010), a TV news magazine series to which students and alums of the school contributed stories.

== North Gate Hall ==
The UC Berkeley Graduate School of Journalism is housed in North Gate Hall, a designated National Historic Landmark in the National Register of Historic Places. It is located immediately southeast of the intersection of Euclid and Hearst avenues in Berkeley, Calif., on the campus of UC Berkeley.

The name is derived from the general area in front of the school called "North Gate," represented by two stone pillars. It serves as the northernmost entrance of the primary University compound, and is opposite to Sather Gate, the southernmost entrance of the University.

North Gate Hall was built in 1904 as a 1,800-square-foot (170 m^{2}) building known at the time as the "Ark" to house the architectural department. The building cost $4,394.59 to construct and consisted of an atelier, office for John Galen Howard and an architectural library with volumes donated by Phoebe Apperson Hearst – mother to William Randolph Hearst.

The building was one of many on campus which did not follow the typical Beaux-Arts architectural style, which had been regarded the most cultured, beautiful and "scientific" style of the cultural establishment at the time. Instead, the building was made only to be temporary, non-academic, or not particularly "serious." Other such buildings in the shingle or "Collegiate Gothic" style on campus include: North Gate Hall, Dwinelle Annex, Stephens Hall and the Men's Faculty Club.

A second addition to the Ark was completed in 1908, increasing the size of the building to 3,400 square feet (320 m^{2}). The new addition was built further up the hill (easterly) and houses what is known today as the Greenhouse and upper and lower newsrooms.

In 1936, Walter Steilberg designed a library wing composed of reinforced concrete-panel, a stark contrast to the dark shingled appearance of the original building.

In 1957, the architecture school was united with the departments of Landscape Architecture, City and regional Planning, and Decorative Arts to form the College of Environmental Design. The "Ark" was relocated to Wurster Hall in 1964, and the building was renamed the Engineering Research Services Building. It later was renamed "North Gate Hall," and served as the location for the Graduate School of Journalism.

North Gate Hall was occupied by the journalism school in 1981.

In 1993 the building underwent extensive seismic renovations causing uproar from Berkeley preservationists who had saved the building from destruction 17 years earlier. It was reported by the San Francisco Chronicle that dry rot had set into much of the building. Damage from aging was so bad, one teacher said he could puncture a supporting column with his fountain pen. It was classified as Berkeley campus' most vulnerable buildings in an earthquake.
