= Thureau-Dangin =

Thureau-Dangin is a French surname. Notable people with the surname include:

- François Thureau-Dangin (1872–1944), French archaeologist, assyriologist, and epigrapher
- Paul Thureau-Dangin (1837–1913), French historian

== See also ==
- Dangin (disambiguation)
