= William J. Drummond =

American journalist

William Joe Drummond (born September 29, 1944, Oakland, California) is an American journalist. He teaches at the UC Berkeley Graduate School of Journalism.

He graduated from the University of California, Berkeley with bachelor's degree, and from the Columbia University Graduate School of Journalism with a master's degree. He was a White House Fellow in 1976. He was associate press secretary to President Jimmy Carter. In 1977, he was a founding editor of “Morning Edition,” at NPR.

== Awards ==
- 1986 Hillman Prize, Broadcast
