= Helicopter Shark =

Hoax photograph

The fake photo

Helicopter Shark is a composition of two photographs that gives the impression that a great white shark is leaping out of the water to attack military personnel climbing a suspended ladder attached to a Special Forces UH-60 Black Hawk helicopter. The photo was widely circulated via an email in 2001, along with a claim that it had been chosen as "National Geographic Photo of the Year". The email in question was usually written in the following form: "AND YOU THINK YOUR HAVING A BAD DAY AT WORK !!" [sic] The photo is similar to an incident in the 1966 film Batman where a shark attacks Batman on a ladder from a helicopter. This raised suspicions that the photo in question was a hoax. National Geographic publicly disavowed the photo and the claimed award as a hoax.

The hoax has been discussed in various texts, including a marketing book to teach lessons about influence and a book on teaching critical thinking. The author Carmel Morris who was known to create and circulate many 'Photoshopped' shark attack images during this period has denied creating the helicopter shark image.

The photo was first published on a website identified as The Grassy Knoll Institute. The final edited photo was created by combining a photograph of a HH-60G Pave Hawk helicopter taken by Lance Cheung for the United States Air Force (USAF), and a photo taken by South African photographer Charles Maxwell. While the helicopter photo was in fact taken in front of the Golden Gate Bridge, the photo of the shark was taken in False Bay, South Africa.

== See also ==
- Hoax
- Internet humor
- Internet phenomenon
- Photo editing
