= Ken Light (photographer) =

American social documentary photographer

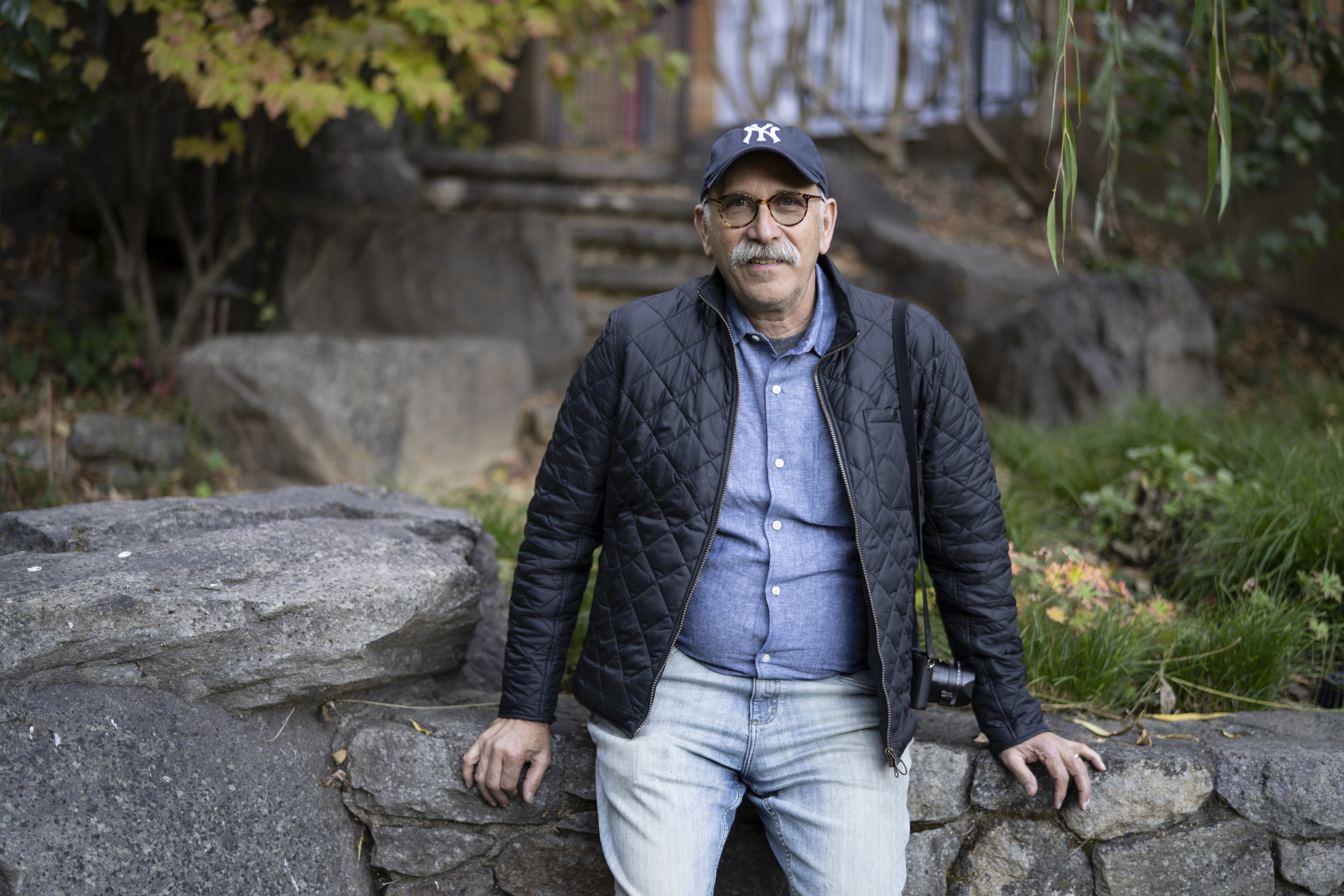
- Light in 2019
- Born: Kenneth Light; March 16, 1951 (age 75); The Bronx, New York, U.S.
- Occupation: Documentary photographer

Kenneth Light (born 1951) better known as Ken Light, is an American social documentary photographer based in the San Francisco Bay Area. He is the author of fourteen monographs, including Report to the Shareholders, Midnight La Frontera, What's Going On? 1969-1974, Delta Time, Texas Death Row, Course of the Empire and, most recently, Soul City, Heyday books and California Anonymous, published by TBW. He wrote Witness in our Time: Working Lives of Documentary Photographers, a collection of recollections and interviews with 29 of the world's most well-known photographers, editors and curators of the genre. He has had his photographs included as part of photo essays and portfolios in newspapers, magazines and other media, has been exhibited worldwide and is part of museum collections such as SF Museum of Modern Art and International Center of Photography. Light was also a co-founder of Fotovision, the Mother Jones International Fund for Documentary Photography and he is the recipient of a Guggenheim Fellowship and three National Endowment for the Arts photography fellowships. He is also a professor at the Graduate School of Journalism at UC Berkeley where he holds the Reva and David Logan chair in photojournalism and he is the director of the school's Logan documentary photography gallery.

Kenneth Baker, the San Francisco Chronicle's art critic, described his black-and-white imagery as placing his work in the lineage of Walker Evans, Dorothea Lange and Robert Frank.

== Early life ==
Light was born in 1951 in the Bronx, New York City, in the United States of America. He would later move with his parents to East Meadow, on Long Island in New York.

== Career ==
Light started shooting film photography when he was 18 years old while studying government and sociology at Ohio University (1969-1973). Having access to his father's camera, he documented important events such as Richard Nixon’s campaign in Ohio, the moratorium to end the Vietnam War in Washington DC and the Cambodia invasion protests and riots at Ohio State University. The photographs from this last event in April 1970 days before four students were killed at Kent State University, were the ones that caused his first break in journalism. Even though he was arrested that day because of his association with the "Underground Press", his film was given back when he got out of jail and he sent prints to Liberation News Service in New York and they were published around the world. It was at this moment that he realized that with a camera one could have a powerful voice and witness to the world.

After he graduated in 1973, Light moved to California and he has been a freelance photographer focusing on social issues in America for more than 55 years (as of 2026). He has also been teaching photojournalism at the Graduate School of Journalism of the University of California Berkeley since 1983. He holds the post of Reva and David Logan Professor of PhotoJournalism at the U.C. Berkeley Graduate School of Journalism. He was the first photographer to become a Laventhol Visiting Professor at Columbia University Graduate School of Journalism and is a Guggenheim Fellow (2021).

== Work ==
His earliest frontline photography taken between 1969 and 1974, capturing America's deep political and social divisions. Chronicling the era's upheaval, from student protests and the Vietnam Moratorium to President Nixon's resignation, Light dispelled the myth of the 1960s as just a carefree cultural movement.This early work was published ad What's Going On? 1969-1974. He moved to California in 1973 and from 1974 to 1975, he photographed in West Oakland, California, documenting the resilient Black community in West Oakland at the encouragement of local residents. The photographs, published as Soul City in 2026, capture daily life, storefront churches, homes, street corners, and local residents demonstrating pride despite disruptions from freeway construction and urban renewal. The work Soul City was published in 2026 by Heyday Books with a forward by Ishmael Reed.

Between 1976 and 1978, a young Ken Light set up a hand-painted canvas backdrop on street corners and in empty storefronts across California locations like Berkeley, Los Angeles, Fairfax, and Stockton. He invited everyday people to step onto the canvas stage for a portrait. In return, each participant received a physical Polaroid picture of themselves. Light used a Hasselblad medium-format camera, giving these street portraits a luminous, formal quality that contrasted with traditional on-the-go documentary work. The series was published in 2026 by TBW Books.

Between 1983 and 1987 along the California/Mexico border, Light rode along with US Border Patrol agents in the middle of the night as they looked for "illegal aliens." The resulting strobe lit images caught against the dark of night of the caught illegal aliens were published in To The Promised Land by Aperture and in 2018 he revisited this work and TBW Books published Midnight la frontera in 2020. The San Francisco MoMA purchased all 86 prints for its permanent collection.

In 1989-1993 He photographed extensively in the Mississippi Delta and created Delta Time with an introduction by the Civil Rights activist Bob Moses.

in 1993 he was called unexpectedly by Suzanne Donovan a friend and writer and asked to work with her on a project about Texas Death Row. In 1994 they were given unlimited access to Death Row in Huntsville, Texas and Light spent a year making extensive trips to photograph Death Row. The photographs were widely published in magazines worldwide in 1995 (Newsweek (6 pages), Paris Match (8 pages) etc. In 1996 a book Texas Death Row was published. The Death Row project and the birth of his daughter Allison Light (1994) had Light step back from his long time practice of in-depth projects. He started a text project interviewing the many photo colleagues and friends about their working methods. This led to a grant from the Hasselblad Foundation and the eventual publication of a text Witness In Our Time: Working Lives of Documentary Photography (Smithsonian Institution Press-2000) now in its second edition. It has been adapted by numerous University programs and is a standard in documentary photography education.

From 1999 to 2002, Light photographed rural poverty in Appalachia. This work examines the human and economic legacy of coal mining in southern West Virginia and profiles diverse local voices, including retired miners, the chronically unemployed, a coal baron, and state figures and detailing how industrial profiteering built national wealth while leaving regional poverty. The series was published in Coal Hollow (2005), with Melanie Light, his wifewho write Oral histories of people in the communities Ken photograhed.

Light spent five years photographing in California's Great Central Valley, documenting the mix of poverty and wealth. He published photographs from this period, with commentary, in Valley of Shadows and Dreams (2012). The book had a forward by Thomas Steinbeck, the son of author John Steinbeck and had an extensive text by Melanie Light. The book was awarded the California Book Award gold medal in 2013 sponsored by the Commonwealth Club of California.

In 2014 Light launched a Kickstarter campaign to self-publish What’s Going On: America 1969-1974. He reached a total of $41,342 from his $30,000 goal. This book is his early photographic work starting when he was 18 years old and a movement activist and photographer with the underground press and Liberation News Service.

From 2010 until 2020, Light embarked on a ten-year visual journey across the United States capturing a deeply polarized nation, systemic inequality, and social crises. The black-and-white photographs, ranging from elite opera balls and Wall Street to distressed small towns, protests, and climate disasters, serve as a historical record of America leading up to and through the Trump Era and growing political divides. This project, Course of the Empire, was published in 2021 by Steidl. In 2021 he received a Guggenheim Fellowship to photograph in America's Rust Belt, Michigan,Ohio, Pennsylvania, Indiana, upstate New York. His work Report to the Shareholders was published in 2027.

== Victim of forgery ==
One of his early photos became the subject of copyright infringement controversy. This image showed John Kerry and Jane Fonda speaking together at an anti-Vietnam War protest but it turned out that Jane Fonda was never at that event. Ken Light's original photograph was digitally altered for partisan purposes and so it was published during the 2004 presidential election campaign.

== Publications ==
=== Books ===
- In the Fields (1982). Published by Harvest Press. Introduction by Paul Taylor (Dorothea Lange's husband).
- With These Hands. (1986) Published by Pilgrim Press. Introduction by César Chávez.
- To The Promised Land. (1988) Published by Aperture. Introduction by Richard Rodriguez
- Delta Time. (1995) Published by the Smithsonian Institution Press. Introduction by Bob Moses. This work has been published in the award-winning documentary film Freedom on My Mind and the film Black is... Black Ain't by Marlon Riggs among other media.
- Texas Death Row. (1997) Published by the University Press of Mississippi. Text by Suzanne Donovan. Used as a reference in multiple platforms such as the New Yorker Magazine story about Todd Willingham, Trial by Fire, Did Texas Execute an innocent man? (2009).
- Witness in our Time: Working Lives of Documentary Photographers (2005) ISBN 978-1588342980 - Editor. Published by the Smithsonian Institution Press. Words of Mary Ellen Mark, Sebastião Salgado and Eugene Richards and others.
- Coal Hollow. (2006) Published by University of California. Written by Ken Light and Melanie Light with forewords by Orville Schell and Robert B. Reich.
- Valley of Shadows & Dreams. (2011) Published by Heyday Books. Foreword by Thomas Steinbeck and text by Melanie Light.
- What’s Going On?. (2015) Published by Light² Media. Text by Ken Light.
- ″Midnight La Frontera". (2020) Published by TBW
- ″Picturing Resistance". (2020) Published by Random House/Ten Speed Press
- "Course of the Empire". (2021) Published by Steidl
- "Soul City" (2026) Published by Heyday Press, 120 photographs foreword by Ishmael Reed
- "California Anonymous" (2026) Published by TBW Books
- "Report to the Shareholders" (2027) Published by Steidl

== Exhibitions ==
- 2004: Photographs from Delta Time as part of an exhibit on William Eggelston at S.F. Museum of Modern Art
- 2005-2006: Coal Hollow at International Center of Photography (ICP) in New York City
- 2008-2009: Coal Hollow at Smith College Art Museum
- 2011-2013: Picturing Modernity exhibit at the San Francisco Museum of Modern Art - What's Going On?
- 2012: Valley of Shadows & Dreams at Oakland Museum of California
- 2017: Dorothea Lange: Politics of Seeing at Oakland Museum of California
- 2017: Resistors: 50 Years of Social Movement. Photography curated by Ken and Melanie Light. Berkeley Art Center

=== Curated exhibitions ===
These are exhibitions of the work of others, of which Light was the curator or co-curator.

- 2017: Resistors: 50 Years of Social Movement Photography, Berkeley Art Center.

== Awards and grants ==
=== Awards ===
- 2021 Guggenheim Fellowship
- 1990: Media Alliance - Meritorious Achievement award for photography
- 1990: Thomas M. Storke International Journalism Award from the World Affairs Council
- 1992: Judges Special Recognition (Cannon Photo Essayist) in the Annual University of Missouri/NPPA Pictures of the Year competition
- 2012: Valley of Shadows & Dreams received the California Book Award -gold medal- for "Contribution to Publishing" by the California Commonwealth Club
- 2015: What's going on? - POY award Best Photography Book - Judges' Special Recognition, Ken Light, Light Squared Media (Light2 Media),

=== Grants ===
- 1973: International Fund for Concerned Photography
- 1975: The California Arts Commission, Artist in Communities
- 1978,1982: The Film Fund (w/LOHP-U.C. Berkeley)
- 1980 National Endowment for the Arts (NEA) Photographers Fellowship
- 1980 National Endowment for the Arts (NEA) Survey Grant
- 1982 National Endowment for the Arts (NEA) Photographers Fellowship
- 1983, 1985, 1995, 2003: The Max and Anna Levinson Foundation
- 1985: The Rosenberg Foundation (w/National Farm worker Migrant Ministry)
- 1994: Erna and Victor Hasselblad Foundation
- 2000: Puffin Foundation
- 2005: The Open Society Institute
- 2017: Jonathan Logan Family Foundation
