= List of photograph manipulation incidents =

This is a list of notable cases of photograph manipulation. Photograph manipulation is an arguably widespread practice that may occur, to a greater or lesser extent, in fields such as politics, fashion, journalism, and entertainment; for purposes including persuasion, censorship, aesthetics, and satire.

== History and politics ==
=== Early American political figures ===
An early example of tampering was in the early 1860s, when a photo was altered using the body from a portrait of John C. Calhoun and the head of Lincoln from a famous seated portrait by Mathew Brady – the same portrait which was the basis for the original Lincoln five-dollar bill. This iconic portrait is an example of a photograph that is very well known by the general public as a real photograph and not an altered one.

Another is exampled in the Library of Congress Prints and Photographs Online Catalogue wherein it exposes a manipulated American Civil War photograph of General Ulysses S. Grant posing horseback in front of his troops at City Point, Virginia. Close analysis of the photograph raises questions and reveals certain details in the photograph that indicate it has been manipulated. For example, Grant's head is set at a strange angle to his body, his uniform is of a different time period, and his favorite horse Cincinnati did not have a left hind sock like the horse in the photograph, although his other horse Egypt did have a sock, but on a different foot. With further research, three different photographs were discovered that explained the composite using Grant's head from one photograph, the body of Major General Alexander McDowell McCook atop his horse from another photograph, and for the background, a 1864 photograph of Confederate prisoners captured at the Battle of Fisher's Hill.

=== Purged (1930) ===
Joseph Stalin often air-brushed his enemies out of photographs. Nikolay Yezhov was removed from the original image after falling out of favor with Stalin and being executed.

=== Mussolini (1942) ===
Benito Mussolini had a portrait done of himself where he was on a horse; he had the horse handler removed from the original photograph in order to make himself look more heroic.

=== Kerry-Fonda Rally (2004) ===
A manipulated photograph surfaced during the U.S presidential campaign of John Kerry in 2004, causing serious controversy. The picture shows both Kerry and Jane Fonda speaking at an anti-war rally. Kerry's team quickly responded that while he did attend many rallies throughout the 1970s, and he did attend at least one with Jane Fonda (a September 1970 anti-war rally in Valley Forge, Pennsylvania of which there is a picture of Fonda with Kerry in the background), Kerry and Fonda never spoke together at any rallies.

=== Kim Jong Il stroke recovery ===
North Korean leader Kim Jong-il suffered a stroke in August 2008. In the following months, the international community speculated as to the effect on Kim's functioning. On 5 November 2008, the North Korean Central News Agency published photos of Kim standing with dozens of Korean soldiers. The Times speculated that at least one of these photos may have been digitally manipulated to give a false impression of Kim's recovery.

=== Malaysia Airlines Flight 17 satellite photographs ===
On 17 July 2014, Malaysia Airlines Flight 17 (MH17) was shot down while flying over eastern Ukraine, killing all 298 occupants. There is now consensus that the plane was shot by a Russian surface-to-air missile launched from pro-Russian separatist-controlled territory in Ukraine, though the Russian government continues to deny involvement. In November of 2014, Russian state television aired purported leaked satellite photographs showing MH17 being fired on by a Ukrainian fighter jet. The images were dismissed by experts as "crude fakes". Russia's defense ministry published photos purporting to show missile launchers belonging to the Ukrainian army positioned near the eastern border days before the crash. A report by the investigative journalism website Bellingcat described the photos as "unequivocally" altered to falsify the dates at which they were taken.

=== Modi at Chennai floods ===
The Indian government's Press Information Bureau was widely criticized and mocked when it tweeted a photo of Indian prime minister Narendra Modi looking out an airplane window, with a separate photo of flooding in Chennai crudely inserted into the view of the window. Internet users mocked the manipulation by creating absurd edits in the same style. The press bureau deleted the tweet, later describing it as an "error of judgement".

== Journalism ==
=== O. J. Simpson (1994) ===
O. J. Simpson's June 17, 1994 mugshot was used on the cover of Time and Newsweek magazines. Newsweek used the mugshot unaltered, whereas Time released one that made Simpson's face appear darker, blurrier and unshaven. This resulted in many people protesting Time for attempting to make Simpson appear guilty.

=== Walski forgery (2003) ===
In the early media coverage of the 2003 Iraq War, a minor controversy erupted when it was revealed that Los Angeles Times photographer Brian Walski had taken two images and made a more dramatic composite.

"When that guy came up with the baby, I shot off ten more frames. I had just one where you could see the soldier's face. The others he was turned away. I put four pictures on my laptop. I was going back and forth. There was no reason to do [what I did]. I was playing around a little bit. I said, 'that looks good.' I worked it and sent it.... I wasn't debating the ethics of it when I was doing it. I was looking for a better image. It was a 14 hour day and I was tired. It was probably ten at night. I was looking to make a picture. Why I chose this course is something I'll go over and over in my head for a long time. I certainly wasn't thinking of the ramifications".

On April 1, Walski was fired.

=== 2006 Lebanon War photographs ===
A number of allegations of improper photo manipulation were made in relation to journalistic coverage of the 2006 Lebanon War. Adnan Hajj, a Lebanese freelance photographer, was found to have manipulated multiple photographs he submitted to Reuters, enhancing the appearance of smoke in a photograph of the aftermath of an Israeli attack on Beirut, and duplicating a flare in a photograph of an Israeli fighter jet to create the impression that it was firing multiple missiles. Other photographers and press outlets were accused of staging photographs and using misleading captions.

=== 2008 Iranian missile launch failure ===
A photograph of the Great Prophet III Iranian missile test published by the website Sepah News, affiliated with the Iranian Revolutionary Guards, was found to have been digitally altered to replace a failed missile. Agence France-Presse, which published the photo on its newswire with attribution to Sepah News, issued a correction on 10 July saying that the photo was "apparently digitally altered."

=== Erasure of female Israeli cabinet ministers by Yated Ne'eman ===
On April 3, 2009, the Israeli newspaper Yated Ne'eman published a photo of Israeli cabinet ministers which was manipulated to replace female cabinet ministers with men to conform to the religious sensitivities of its readers.

=== "Ruins of the Second Gilded Age" photo essay ===
In July 2009, The New York Times Magazine published a photo essay by photographer Edgar Martins titled "Ruins of the Second Gilded Age". Martins claimed that the photos in the essay were not digitally manipulated and had previously stated that he eschewed any post-production in his work. Commenters on the online community MetaFilter discovered evidence that the images in the essay had been digitally manipulated. The Times magazine later removed the essay from its website, with a statement that editors had "confronted the photographer and determined that most of the images did not wholly reflect the reality they purported to show". Martins denied that he had warrantied to the Times that the photos had been free from manipulation.

=== The Economist "Obama v. BP" cover ===
The June 19, 2010 issue of The Economist magazine used a photograph of Barack Obama turned away from the camera with an oil rig in the background. The cover story, headlined "Obama v. BP", concerned the BP oil spill. The New York Times reported that the photograph had been manipulated. The original Reuters photo showed Obama standing close beside two individuals, a Coast Guard admiral and a local parish president; The Economist had excised the other two figures so that Obama appeared to be standing alone. In a statement to the Times, an editor of The Economist said that Charlotte Randolph, the parish president, had been removed only to avoid confusing readers, and not to "make a political point". She denied that the magazine intended to make Obama appear isolated.

=== Al-Ahram repositioning of Hosni Mubarak ===
The Egyptian newspaper Al-Ahram generated controversy in September 2010 when an Egyptian blogger, Wael Khalil, revealed that the newspaper had altered a photo of Middle East leaders walking with United States President Barack Obama so that instead of Obama leading the group, Egyptian President Mubarak was placed in the front when he was actually walking in the rearmost position. Osama Saraya, Al-Ahram's editor-in-chief, defended the altered photo, stating that it was meant to underscore Egypt's leading role in the peace process: "The expressionist photo is... a brief, live and true expression of the prominent stance of President Mubarak in the Palestinian issue, his unique role in leading it before Washington or any other."

=== Erasure of women from Situation Room photograph ===
Situation Room is a photograph taken in the White House Situation Room showing President Barack Obama and his security team receiving updates during the operation which led to the killing of Osama bin Laden. A number of Hasidic newspapers, including the Brooklyn-based Di Tzeitung published a version of the photo in which the two women present, Hillary Clinton and Audrey Tomason, were erased. Di Tzeitung defended the decision as being in conformance with Jewish modesty laws, and that it should not be seen as degrading of women.

== Hoaxes ==
=== Fairies (1917) ===
Frances Griffiths with Fairies

This picture shows Frances Griffiths, one of two cousins who featured in the images known as the "Cottingley Fairies". This photo was part of a series showing fairies made by the cousins. The photos became highly publicized with some people believing they were fake while others believed their authenticity. Later the cousins admitted that the pictures were not manipulated but that they made the fairies out of cardboard and staged them in the scene. Besides this confession the cousins still claimed that they had seen fairies.

=== Tourist of Death (1997) ===
This picture was released to email and went viral after New York City was attacked on September 11, 2001. The title of the email was "the tourist guy", "the accidental tourist", "Waldo" or the "WTC Guy". It showed a man standing on the observation deck of one of the World Trade Center towers, with an aircraft visible behind him on a collision course with the tower. When others started claiming to be the subject of the photo, a 25-year-old Hungarian man named Péter Guzli came forward and explained that he did not want any publicity.

"I'd like to keep my identity incognito ... This was a joke meant for my friends, not such a wide audience." Guzli had taken the picture in 1997 when he had visited relatives in New York; after 9/11, he edited the picture to make it appear as though he had been on the tower when the aircraft collided with it.

== Censorship ==
=== Beatles Abbey Road (2003) ===
The original copy of the Beatles' Abbey Road (1969) album cover shows Paul McCartney, third in line, holding a cigarette. United States poster companies have airbrushed this image to remove the cigarette from McCartney’s hand. This change was made without the permission of either McCartney or Apple Records, which owns the rights to the image.

== Fashion and celebrity photography ==
=== Oprah (1989) ===
Oprah Winfrey was on the cover of TV Guide in 1989. The picture showed a very slender-looking Winfrey in a dress that was recognized by actress Ann-Margret's fashion designer. It was revealed that the picture was actually a composite of Oprah's head spliced onto the body of Ann-Margret from a 1979 publicity shot. Neither Oprah Winfrey nor Ann-Margret had given permission for the composite to be created.

=== Ralph Lauren (2009) ===
The most notorious example of extreme retouching in fashion advertising was made in a magazine advertisement by Ralph Lauren which depicted a heavily manipulated photo of model Filippa Hamilton. Many complaints were made saying that the image had impossibly inhuman proportions. A Ralph Lauren representative admitted to "poor imaging and retouching", and added, "we have learned that we are responsible for the poor imaging and retouching that resulted in a very distorted image of a woman’s body. We have addressed the problem and going forward will take every precaution to ensure that the calibre of our artwork represents our brand appropriately."

== Other incidents ==
=== Diversity (2000) ===
Hoping to illustrate its diverse enrollment, the University of Wisconsin at Madison doctored a photograph on a brochure cover by digitally inserting a black student in a crowd of white football fans. The original photograph of white fans was taken in 1993. The additional black student, senior Diallo Shabazz, was taken in 1994. University officials said that they spent the summer looking for pictures that would show the school’s diversity but could find none.
