= Pascal Dangin =

American artist

Pascal Dangin (French pronunciation: [pa.skal dɑ̃.ʒɛ̃]) is a digital artist associated with retouching fashion photographs. He is the founder and chief executive of Box, a photo retouching business based in New York, United States.

== Early years ==
In his youth, Dangin lived in small towns in Corsica with his family. His parents were musically talented yet Dangin was indifferent to music. Dangin had two sisters and a “tumultuous, itinerant childhood, which he does not like to recall” (Collins).

Before he turned fifteen, Dangin left home and worked as a shampoo boy in a no-name salon in Paris’s Fifteenth Arrondissement. Dangin was drafted by the French Army and after serving for three months, was discharged and returned to Paris to continue his work as a hairdresser.

Dangin moved to America in 1989, leaving Paris on New Year’s Day. While doing hair for photo shoots in New York, he became interested in the connection between cameras and computers. In 1993, Dangin accepted his first paid retouching job.

== The Photo Whisperer ==
Pascal Dangin is sometimes called the "Photo Whisperer". He has been dubbed the "premier retoucher of fashion photographs" ("Final Fantasy"). Dangin is known in the fashion world as a Digital artist, editing shots that have appeared in Vanity Fair and Vogue ("Pascal Dangin").

== Box ==
Dangin is the founder and CEO of Box Studios, where he leads a team of 40 photo post-production experts doing work for major magazines, photographers, and ad agencies. Photo projects range in revenue from $500 for a small photo to $20,000 for the cover of a major magazine.
