= Elena Conis =

American historian of medicine, public health, and the environment

- Occupations: Professor, Journalist
- Title: Associate Professor of Journalism

Academic background
- Education: Columbia University (BA); University of California, Berkeley (MA); University of California, San Francisco (PhD)

Academic work
- Discipline: History
- Sub-discipline: History of the Environment, Public Health, and Medicine, in the 19th and 20th centuries, United States
- Institutions: University of California, Berkeley (2016–present); University of California, San Francisco (2016–present); Emory University (2009–2016); The Los Angeles Times (2003–2011)

Elena Conis is an American writer and historian of medicine. Her work focuses on the history of medicine, public health, and the environment, with particular focuses on the history of vaccination, infectious diseases, and pesticides. She is currently a Professor in the Graduate School of Journalism at the University of California, Berkeley, currently serving in the acting dean role until a permanent dean is hired.

== Education and career ==
Elena Conis received her bachelor's degree in biology from Columbia University in 1996, followed by master's degrees in global health and environment and journalism from the University of California, Berkeley. While studying at Berkeley, she began to work as a columnist and features writer for the Los Angeles Times. An award-winning health journalist, she wrote for the paper's "Esoterica Medica", "Nutrition Lab", and "Supplements" columns until 2011.

After completing her PhD in the history of health sciences at the University of California, San Francisco, Conis joined the faculty of Emory University as an assistant professor in the Department of History and the Andrew W. Mellon Foundation Faculty Fellow in Health and the Humanities. She taught undergraduate and graduate courses on the history of health, medicine, and the environment. In 2016, Conis was a Cain Postdoctoral Fellow at the Science History Institute.

Conis is most prominently known for her 2015 book, Vaccine Nation: America’s Changing Relationship with Immunization, which was awarded the Arthur J. Viseltear Prize from the American Public Health Association.

Conis is currently Associate Professor of Journalism in the Graduate School of Journalism at the University of California, Berkeley, where she directs the joint master’s program in journalism and public health (MJ / MPH). She is a faculty affiliate of the Center for Science, Technology, Medicine, and Society; the Berkeley Center for Social Medicine; and the Department of Media Studies, at the University of California, Berkeley. She is also affiliated faculty of the Department of Humanities and Social Science at the University of California, San Francisco.

== Selected bibliography ==
=== Books ===
- Conis, Elena C.; Eder, Sandra; Medeiros, Aimee (2021). Pink and Blue: Gender, Culture, and the Health of Children. New Brunswick, New Jersey: Rutgers University Press. ISBN 978-1-9788-0984-0.
- Conis, Elena (2015). Vaccine Nation: America's Changing Relationship with Immunization (Paperback ed.). Chicago, Illinois: University of Chicago Press. ISBN 978-0-226-37839-8.
- Conis, Elena (2022). How to Sell a Poison: The Rise, Fall, and Toxic Return of DDT. Bold Type Books, 2022. ISBN 978-1-64503-674-6

=== Journal articles ===
- Conis, Elena (April 2020). "The History of the Personal Belief Exemption". Pediatrics. 145 (4) e20192551. doi:10.1542/peds.2019-2551. PMID 32184337. S2CID 212751761.
- Conis, Elena (March 2019). "Measles and the Modern History of Vaccination". Public Health Reports. 134 (2): 118–125. doi:10.1177/0033354919826558. PMC 6410476. PMID 30763141.
- Conis, Elena (1 October 2017). "Polio, DDT, and Disease Risk in the United States after World War II". Environmental History. 22 (4): 696–721. doi:10.1093/envhis/emx086.
- Conis, Elena (1 October 2013). "A Mother's Responsibility: Women, Medicine, and the Rise of Contemporary Vaccine Skepticism in the United States". Bulletin of the History of Medicine. 87 (3): 407–435. doi:10.1353/bhm.2013.0047. PMID 24096560. S2CID 34133674.
- Conis, Elena (March 2010). "Debating the Health Effects of DDT: Thomas Jukes, Charles Wurster, and the Fate of an Environmental Pollutant". Public Health Reports. 125 (2): 337–342. doi:10.1177/003335491012500224. PMC 2821864. PMID 20297762.
