= Dangin-dong =

- Country: South Korea

Korean name
- Hangul: 당인동
- Hanja: 唐人洞
- RR: Dangin-dong
- MR: Tangin-dong

Dangin-dong (Korean: 당인동) is a dong (neighborhood) of Mapo District, Seoul, South Korea.

== See also ==
- Administrative divisions of South Korea
