= Kerry–Fonda 2004 election photo controversy =

Composite of two different images: one of Kerry taken on June 13, 1971 and one of Jane Fonda taken in August, 1972

During the 2004 presidential election campaign an image was released that showed John Kerry and Jane Fonda speaking together at an anti-Vietnam War protest. The image turned out to be a politically motivated forgery, intended to link Kerry with Fonda, whom some consider a traitor after her controversial visit to Hanoi during the Vietnam War.

== Forgery ==
The image is a composite of two different images: one of Kerry taken on June 13, 1971, at an anti-war rally in Mineola, New York and one of Fonda taken in August, 1972, speaking at a Miami Beach, Florida rally. The images were combined and then further altered to appear as if the combined image was from an old newspaper clipping. A caption was also added stating, "Actress And Anti-War Activist Jane Fonda Speaks to a crowd of Vietnam Veterans as Activist and Former Vietnam Vet John Kerry (LEFT) listens and prepares to speak next concerning the war in Vietnam (AP Photo)" even though Fonda was not present when Kerry gave his speech.

The most influential media outlet to publish the forgery was The New York Times, which cited the image in a Sheryl Gay Stolberg story on February 13, 2004. The image received further attention on many websites. Right-wing opponents of Kerry, meanwhile, claimed that the original image of him was fabricated and that the combined image is the real image.

Ken Light, the copyright owner of the original Kerry image, has the original negatives and was quoted when asked what lesson was to be learned from the story:

The lesson is to take lots of photographs, be conscious that if things don't seem at that moment important, they may be important. Store your film and keep it organized. And be vigilant about how your work is used. This is the challenge in the new digital age. I hope at some point, some smart computer scientist will come up with a solution. Some sort of encryption in the digital file that can't be passed on.

— Ken Light

The only known authentic photograph in which Kerry and Fonda appear together was taken by Leif Skoogfors at a rally at Valley Forge, PA in 1970.

== Lawsuit ==
In 2005, Light tracked down the creator of the image, Richard Taylor, and sued him in New York Federal District Court for copyright infringement. Light sought damages of $200,000 plus legal fees. The original case was thrown out based on jurisdictional issues and the United States Second Circuit Court of Appeals affirmed the decision of the district court.
