= Simpson Kalisher =

American photographer (1926–2023)

- Born: July 27, 1926; New York City, U.S.
- Died: June 13, 2023 (aged 96); Delray Beach, Florida, U.S.
- Education: Autodidact
- Known for: Photography
- Awards: 1975, Gold Medal, Art Directors Club of Boston

Simpson Kalisher (July 27, 1926 – June 13, 2023) was an American professional photojournalist and street photographer whose independent project Railroad Men attracted critical attention and is regarded as historically significant.

== Early life ==
Simpson Kalisher was born to a Jewish family on July 27, 1926, in the Bronx, New York City, the youngest son of Sheva and Ben Kalisher and brother of Fay and Murray. After one year of college, Kalisher was drafted into the military aged 18 in October 1944 for WW2 and was admitted to military hospital briefly in August 1945. He served in the U.S. Army until 1946 and was decorated with the Combat Infantryman's Badge.

== Photographer ==
=== Commercial work ===
==== Freelance ====
After the war Kalisher undertook a BA in History at Indiana University Bloomington, graduating in 1948 whereupon he immediately started in commercial photography, freelancing for Scope Associates whose clients included Texas Co. in the oil industry of the Kalispell area, and one of his pictures, taken for the company pre-1954, of two women in frilly aprons backlit and chatting at the gate of a house, was chosen by Edward Steichen for MoMA's world-touring The Family of Man, seen by nine million visitors.

==== Magazines ====
His cameras at the time were Canon and Contax 35 mm format, efficient and compact Japanese cameras increasingly being embraced by photojournalists post-war. Using them he produced images for a range of trade magazines like Chevrolet's Friends, the American Iron and Steel Institute's Steelways, and photographed for MoMA. In a 1958 article in Popular Photography illustrated with his own pictures he urged his colleagues to consider "The World's Largest Photo Market", the company magazine. From the early fifties his photographs also appeared in American Youth, Sports Illustrated, Fortune, Interiors, Television/Radio Age, Coronet, Musical America, Popular Photography, Business Week, and he produced the photographs for book publications including Clinical Sociology and for a new 1955 edition of Charles Darwin's The Expression of the emotions in man and animals.

==== Annual reports and advertising ====
Kalisher's work for annual reports was recognised in the Time-LIFE photography book Photojournalism which in a section "Helping Corporations Look Their Best" it used examples of his semi-abstract colour photographs for the annual reports of the Wallace-Murray Corporation and of Bangor Punta. Other clients for annual reports were Mobil, Champion International (1976), Condec Corporation, Miles Pharmaceuticals and Arkwright-Boston Insurance. He received a gold medal in 1975 for a Cabot Corporation annual report in the Editorial category of The 21st annual exhibition of the Art Directors Club of Boston. A later client, in 1980 when Kalisher was in his fifties, was the Salvation Army, for whom he produced a series of gritty vignettes for their magazine advertisements.

=== Independent documentary projects ===
Kalisher was better known for his independent projects, including his street photography made mostly in New York City, which he published in book form, exhibited, and which were included in major Museum of Modern Art surveys including The Family of Man (1955) and Mirrors and Windows: American Photography Since 1960 (1978).

During the 1950s he joined others freely practicing social documentary photography as an emerging art form; he befriended Garry Winogrand, who grew up near Kalisher, and his associates Guy Gillette, Jay Maisel, and John Lewis Stage as well as Lee Friedlander, who arrived in New York in 1955. It was Kalisher who introduced Winogrand to Nathan Lyons, assistant director of George Eastman House, Rochester, New York in 1952. During the showing of The Family of Man at MoMA (1955), Kalisher, Arthur Lavine, May Mirin, Hella Hammid, Ray Jacobs, Ruth Orkin, and Ed Wallowitch. and others included in that landmark international exhibition gathered at Helen Gee's Limelight gallery, New York City's first important post-war photography gallery. In 1957 he joined Winogrand in meetings of an informal group of independent photographers, with Lee Friedlander, David Vestal, Saul Leiter, Walt Silver and Harold Feinstein in John Cohen's loft. Later, in 1966 Kalisher was to tape-record an interview with Winogrand in which they discussed the 'snapshot' aesthetic and the desirability of its 'casualness', though it was a term Winogrand was to disown in the 1970s.

In 1959 the photographer Ivan Dmitri, with support of the Saturday Review, initiated "Photography in the Fine Arts" (PFA), a series of six large group exhibitions of contemporary photography selected by juries of American museum curators and exhibited in national museums. During its preparation in 1958 both U.S. Camera and Modern Photography denounced the project because the work selected was from commercially published sources, and not by direct request from the photographers themselves. In 1959 members and associates of the independent group, Kalisher, Robert Frank, Lee Friedlander, Ray Jacobs, Saul Leiter, Jay Maisel, Walt Silver, David Vestal and Garry Winogrand signed a letter of objection, sending it to MoMA, which may have influenced Edward Steichen in a decision not to continue supporting PFA beyond its initial exhibition.

Kalisher's 1961 book, Railroad Men: A Book of Photographs and Collected Stories with 44 duotone plates of men at work on trains and in railway yards in a period of decline for that form of transport, was produced from pictures for an unpublished magazine assignment. He funded the project himself and used a Leica and tape recorder. The photographs were accompanied by 44 interviews recorded by the photographer.

Kalisher followed Railroad Men with two more photographic books, Propaganda and Other Photographs (1976) in which Ian Jeffrey identifies the photographer as "a specialist observer of urban alienation and, like Diane Arbus, a brutal parodist of pictorial stereotypes;" and The Alienated Photographer (2011), the contents of which were also exhibited.

Kalisher was listed in a document with other photographers Garry Winogrand, Hans Namuth, Harry Callahan, Roy De Carava, amongst numbers of artists and musicians as attending a public meeting of the National Committee for a SANE Nuclear Policy in Madison Square Garden on May 19, 1960. The document was used in the 1960 Senate inquiry "Communist Infiltration in the Nuclear Test Ban Movement. In 1974, by contrast, he is identified as "the internationally famed photographer" for his picture of Litchfield County's Shepaug River used to illustrate the Senate Committee on Interior and Insular Affairs Amend the Wild and Scenic Rivers Act document (part 4) to show its "scenic beauty of and the dramatic action of its clear, unspoiled water."

== Portraits ==
Kalisher photographed several significant people; his candid series of poet Reuel Denney speaking were used by anthropologist Margaret Mead as examples in her 1955 update of Charles Darwin's The Expression of the emotions in man and animals. He photographed Mead too, and designer Paul Rand, artist Peter Voulkos, entrepreneur Mitch Kapor, philosopher Marshall McLuhan, and conductor Newell Jenkins. Even his executive portraits for annual reports had an informal, reportage quality; he told Arnold Newman for an article in Universal Photo Almanac that "each portrait must be a fresh experience and that the camera user must discard formulas of working."

== Reception ==
Helmut Gernsheim described Kalisher's Railroad Men as "a highly stimulating book (1961) on the forgotten workers of the American railroad companies", and in 1962 curator Hugh Edwards likened it to the work of Lewis Hine, Walker Evans, and W. Eugene Smith, as promoting "those ancient qualities, human dignity and character." Beaumont Newhall, Director at George Eastman House selected him for Art in America's 1960 listing of 'New Talent Artists', and congratulated him on his book, writing; "Many photographers have documented railroads, but you have brought us a moving record of railroad men." 'R.B.' in Image magazine welcomed its "sensitive yet striking images selected and organized by a perceptive eye and ear", and sensed in the "somber sometimes haunting pictures and a counter point of stories ... reflections of a setting sun; the proud tired faces of men no longer young, working in the unhurried evening of an elderly industry." Rus Arnold in Writer's Digest said what he thought most important about Railroad Men:

the fact that Kalisher has presented to us another variation on photo-reporting. Even while he was recording "the remarkable decency of these mature human faces and the brotherhood of the men's vocation" (as Jonathan Williams puts it in the introduction) he was tape-recording their thoughts, their memories. The formula is one many of us could well look into. It's not entirely new. The camera-and-tape-recorder interview has been appearing in magazines for years, but the result has usually been a set of words illustrated by pictures, or a set of pictures with quote-captions. In Railroad Men we have a social document conveyed through two media of communication, a rare blending of two pieces of machinery (the camera and the tape recorder) to produce a poetic essay.

John Upton in Aperture, 1962, was more guarded in his praise, conceding that Railroad Men represents "the efforts of a photojournalist to come to grips with his medium on his own terms, without the pressures of deadline or editors", inspired while on a magazine assignment, and the taped interviews "an attempt to bring to life the romance and lore of this peculiarly American industry", but notes that though the skilful photographs are clearly the work of a "bread and butter photojournalist [they] often lack the poetic edge that turns fact into truth. The viewer never feels that the author has really come to "grips" with his medium as he states as his purpose in the epilogue ... The book illustrates both the pitfalls and advantages of what can happen when a photojournalist gets his wish and works without the guiding hand of the picture editor."

Edith Weigle in the Tribune of Kalisher's 1962 show at the Art Institute of Chicago wrote

They are powerful because of the photographer's ability to get at the essentials and to comprehend and portray the character of each man. Nonessentials are stripped away. The only "special effects" are the deep shadows which are there by nature, and the photographer's use of empty space, which seems innate.

Much later, when the photographer was 85, in their review of his retrospective Simpson Kalisher: The Alienated Photographer at De Lellis Gallery in 2011, The New Yorker characterises his output as sharing "a casually incisive style with Garry Winogrand's, Tod Papageorge's, and Joel Meyerowitz's pictures of the city … but Kalisher worked primarily on the street, yielding photographs that are anecdotal and full of characters."

William Meyers contradicts Upton's earlier perception that few of the railroad photographs "make the common very uncommon", when he reviewed the 2011 show in The Wall Street Journal;

Simpson Kalisher ... is one of the street photographers who made midtown Manhattan as critical a site for mid-20th-century photography as the forest of Arden was for Shakespearean comedy. In a picture taken in 1959, the camera looks north up Fifth Avenue as the traffic light changes and a massed wave of pedestrians steps off the curb to cross West 51st Street. Nothing unusual is happening in this picture, there are no freaks or confrontations, but our eye keeps moving left to right and then right to left across the line of faces approaching us: The ordinariness of these people is quite stunning. The men and women look straight ahead as they march single-mindedly toward us and their destinations. It is not really us, of course, but Mr. Kalisher who is headed in the other direction.

The highest price paid for a print by Kalisher at auction is US$1,875 for an untitled work made c. 1949–1950, sold at Christie's New York in 2010.

== Teaching and industry contributions ==
In the 1960s Kalisher was a regional editor for Aperture photography magazine alongside others, and in 1962 was elected alternate secretary of the American Society of Magazine Photographers.

== Personal life ==
Kalisher's son Jesse, after a career in advertising, also became a photographer, and operated his own gallery. He died in 2017.

During a 50-year career in photography, Kalisher lived in New York from 1950 to 1971, returning from 2005 to 2013, first in Roxbury from 1971 to 1998 and in Greenwich from 1998 to 2005. He retired to Delray Beach, Florida in 2013 and died there on June 13, 2023, at age 96.

== Publications ==
- Railroad Men: A Book of Photographs and Collected Stories, with an introduction by Jonathan Williams, New York 1961.
- Propaganda and Other Photographs, with an introduction by Russel Baker, and afterword by Allon Schoener, Danbury, New Hampshire 1976.
- Illustrations for Clinical Sociology by Glassner and Freedman, New York and London 1979.
- The Alienated Photographer, Simpson Kalister and Luc Sante, Two Penny Press 2011.

== Exhibitions ==
=== Solo ===
- 1961, October: Simpson Kalisher, Eastman House
- 1962, September–October: Simpson Kalisher, 60 photographs, Art Institute Chicago
- 1978, September–October: Photography as social literature: concurrent shows of documentary photography by Roy Stryker and Simpson Kalisher. Farmington Valley Arts Center, Avon Park North
- 1980, August–September: Photographs by Simpson Kalisher of Roxbury, and photographs from two of Kalisher's books, "Railroad Men, Photographs and Collected Stories" and "Propaganda and other Photographs". Voltaire Gallery, New Milford
- 1984, June–September: Simpson Kalisher Railroad Men, photographs of rail workers. Akron Art Museum
- 2001, May–August: The City Seen: Simpson Kalisher Photographs, Everson Museum of Art, Syracuse
- 2003, August 8: Auto-Focus. Keith de Lellis Gallery, 47 East 68th Street, Manhattan
- 2011, Simpson Kalisher: The Alienated Photographer, Museum of Fine Arts Houston, River Oaks, Houston, Texas, USA

=== Group ===
- 1950, August–September: Photographs by 51 Photographers, Museum of Modern Art, New York
- 1955, January–May: The Family of Man, Museum of Modern Art, New York
- 1964, February–March: Four directions in photography Simpson Kalisher, Oscar Bailey, Charles Swedlund, Minor White, Albright–Knox Art Gallery
- 1965, March–May: The Photo Essay, Museum of Modern Art, New York
- 1965/6, October 1965 – January 1966: Recent Acquisitions: Photography, Museum of Modern Art, New York
- 1967, January–February: 12 photographers of the American social landscape, Rose Art Museum, Brandeis University, Waltham, Mass.
- 1967, July: Summer show: 12 photographers of the American social landscape, Addison Gallery, Phillips Academy, Andover, from Poses Institute of Fine Arts, Brandeis University
- 1968, February–March: Ben Schultz Memorial Exhibition, Museum of Modern Art, New York
- 1971, April 2: Steichen Gallery Reinstallation, Museum of Modern Art, New York
- 1976, January–February: The Camera's Century: The American Situation. 88 photographs. Ackland Museum, Chapel Hill
- 1978, July–October: Mirrors and Windows: American Photography since 1960
- 1995/6, December–January: Black-and white photographs of New York City dating from the forties through the sixties by David Attie, Donald Blumberg, Simpson Kalisher, Fritz Neugass, and Marvin Newman. James Danziger Gallery, 130 Prince St. New York
- 2019, Moves Like Walter: New Curators Open the Corcoran Legacy Collection, American University Museum, Washington D.C., District Of Columbia, USA

== Awards ==
- Life magazine Contest for Young Photographers, Third Honourable Mention, Individual Picture Division
- Gold Medal for a Cabot Corporation report by Michael Weymouth and Simpson Kalisher of Weymouth Design in the Editorial category of The 21st annual exhibition of the Art Directors Club of Boston "Design 1"
- 1968: Arts Grant, NY State Commn.
- 1969–1971: NY State Grant

== Collections ==
- Art Institute of Chicago, Chicago: 14 prints (as of June 18, 2023)
- San Francisco Museum of Modern Art: 2 prints (as of June 18, 2023)
- National Gallery of Art, New York: 1 print (as of June 18, 2023)
- Museum of Fine Arts, Houston: 95 prints (as of June 18, 2023)
- Museum of Modern Art, New York: 1 print (as of June 18, 2023)
