= The Chinese Revolutionary Artists' Club =

The Chinese Revolutionary Artists' Club was formed in 1926 in San Francisco Chinatown. It is thought to be the first Chinese immigrant artist collective in America, founded by artist Yun Gee.

Working in oils in the modernist style, the collective's dozen or so members primarily painted each other and Chinatown street scenes and artifacts. Under Gee's leadership, they undertook cubist-derived experimentation, emphasizing color contrasts, thick brushstrokes, angular planes and bold facets. The collective worked out of a small studio at 150 Wetmore Place on the Western edge of San Francisco Chinatown. It dissolved sometime in the 1930s.

== History ==
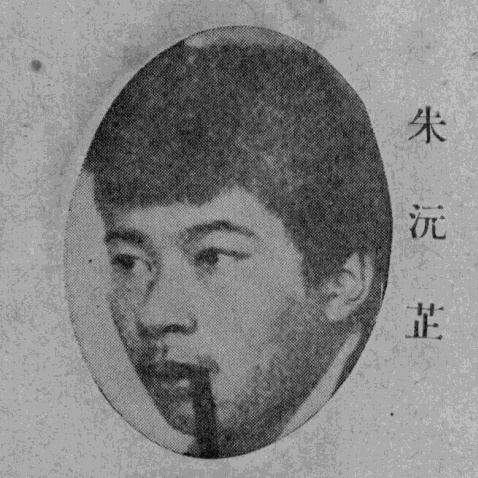
Painter Yun Gee (朱沅芷)

Modernist painter Yun Gee 朱沅芷 (who went by the Anglicized appellation using the first character of his Chinese given name, 沅 Yun, and last name 朱 Gee), founded the club when he was twenty. He immigrated to San Francisco from Kaiping, Guangdong province in China at age fifteen, and studied painting and drawing at California School of Fine Arts (later renamed the San Francisco Art Institute), where he came into contact with avant-garde artists and writers such as the painter John Ferren and the poet Kenneth Rexroth. Gee, these artists, and his teacher and good friend Otis Oldfield, established the Modern Gallery on Montgomery Street, San Francisco, to showcase the work of younger artists for greater public visibility. At the Chinese Revolutionary Artists' Club, Gee gave members instructions in advanced painting techniques and theory. Oldfield described the club's focus as "doing [modernist oil] work that is essentially Chinese." Yun Gee is said to have explained why he eschewed traditional Chinese painting techniques by stating: "Because I am living in a modern industrial society,” and this philosophy must also have underpinned the work of his students and fellow artists at the club.

In April 1927 the club held an exhibition at 18 Waverly Place, San Francisco, which received a mention in the Niagara Falls Gazette. In the brief mention the columnist noted that none of the exhibiting artists were more than twenty years of age and one was only fifteen. The club's membership was mostly male, adding one female member in the 1930s, Mrs. Eva Fong Chan. Likely of working-class origin in the low-paying jobs allowed Chinese at the time, such as servants, cooks, dishwashers, and launderers, members "pooled their meager wages to afford the precious paints and other communally shared art supplies, and painted…on cheap paperboard rather than expensive primed canvas."

Street Scene, by Yun Gee

Gee left in 1927 to further his career in Paris and later New York. In late 1930 or early 1931 the club hosted a reception for celebrated Mexican muralist Diego Rivera while he was in San Francisco to work on his first U.S. murals. It is unclear how that encounter affected the group, especially given language barriers for the young artists in communicating with the Spanish-speaking Rivera, but they added their first and only female member after that event. The club may have held infrequent exhibitions. While Yun Gee was able to achieve art world recognition, little survives or is known of the other club members' work, which did not find mainstream acclaim, especially amidst the anti-Chinese hostilities of the time. The club dissolved in the 1930s during the city’s most violent era of labor strife. Some former members worked on through 1940s, and some went on to teach next generations of painters in the Chinatown community.

== Influences ==
The young Chinese immigrant collective came into existence against the backdrop of anti-Chinese racism that historically impacted Chinese immigrants since the 1800s. Like other urban Chinatowns in America, San Francisco Chinatown was "the consequence of the exclusion laws, which created the conditions, between racism and the law itself, for segregated, isolated Chinatowns,” said historian John Kuo Wei Tchen. Chief among these exclusion laws, the Chinese Exclusion Act of 1882 closed off immigration to Chinese laborers, and two years before the formation of the Chinese Revolutionary Artists' Club, the Immigration Act of 1924, or the National Origins Act, an even harsher anti-immigration law conceived as "a bulwark against 'a stream of alien blood'", banned immigration from Asia and set quotas on immigrants from Eastern and Southern Europe.

Commenting on the formation of the club in this hostile environment, art historian Anthony W. Lee wrote that club members "constitute[d] a necessarily segregated painting collective and must have had some sense of the possibilities within their marginalized space – visions that may not have been captured in the institutional or critical categories developed by the city’s increasingly sophisticated network of dealers and critics, visions that were surely distinctive and fraught with contradiction during a moment of explicit antagonism against Chinatown’s inhabitants."

In an unpublished early essay titled “Art in the Chinese Republic,” Yun Gee wrote that the aim of the club “is not to cultivate merely an art of compromise, nor a safe middle-of-the-road art, but to create an art that is vital and alive that will contribute to the development of Chinese painting technique…" He acknowledged the challenge and expressed hope for eventually succeeding in developing the new style. One possible manifestation of the "revolutionary" in the club's name is the way the artists broke with the more conservative styles characteristic of most of San Francisco's art world at the time.^{[1]} It is hard to gauge the direct influence on the collective of Diego Rivera's modernist vision and commitment to art as a collective force for liberation, other than their interest in the muralist's work such that the club hosted his 1930/31 reception. According to art historian Anthony Lee, while its vision may seem utopian today, the Chinese Revolutionary Artist's Club represents a historical milestone in the collaboration of marginalized young Chinatown immigrants toward modernist cultural dreams, amidst early 20th century xenophobia in the industrializing United States.
