= Don Donaghy =

American photographer (1936–2008)

Don Donaghy (born Leonard Donald Donaghy in Pennsylvania; 2 November 1936 – 23 July 2008) was a member of the New York school of photography.

Donaghy studied at the Philadelphia Museum School of Art after which he pursued street photography in Philadelphia and New York City using a Leica 35mm camera. His first exhibition Two Young Philadelphians: Don Donaghy & George Krause, was held in 1962. Donaghy's first published work was a re-creation of this exhibition in the Fall 1962 issue of Contemporary Photographer, titled same as the show.

The landmark exhibition and publication The New York School, Photographs 1936-63, by Jane Livingston, includes a selection of Donaghy's photographs. Donaghy is featured in "The Last Photographic Heroes: American Photographers of the Sixties and Seventies", by Gilles Mora.

In addition to photography, Donaghy worked as a film editor and a cameraman. While living in Boulder, CO, he was also a construction foreman. He died on July 23, 2008.

== Publications with contributions by Donaghy ==
- The New York School, Photographs 1936-63. ISBN 978-1-55670-239-6. By Jane Livingston.
- The Last Photographic Heroes: American Photographers of the Sixties and Seventies. ISBN 978-0-8109-9374-7. By Gilles Mora.

== Exhibitions ==
- Three Photographers: Nicholas Dean, Bill Hanson, Don Donaghy (Rochester, NY, Aug 21 to Oct 21, 1963)
- Photography 63/An International Exhibition (Syracuse NY, Rochester NY and Fort Wayne IN, August 1963 to February 1964)(George Eastman House database)
- Six Photographers I (Contemporary Photographers I) (Rochester NY, 1964)(George Eastman House database)
- Photographs Do Not Bend Past Show Listing (Oct 27 to Dec 2, 2000 show with Keith Carter)
- Gallery Sink, Previous Exhibitions (Sep 27 to Nov 29, 2002 group show)
- Hemphill Fine Arts Exhibition Archive (2006 show with Benjamin Abramowitz and William Christenberry)
- Yancey Richardson Gallery > Past Exhibitions > 2006 (Oct 27 to Nov 25, 2006 show)
- Chance Encounters: Photographs from the Collection of Norman Carr and Carolyn Kinder Carr ([Corcoran Gallery of Art], 2008)
- Street Seen: The Psychological Gesture in American Photography, 1940–1959, Milwaukee Art Museum, 2010

== Collections ==
Donaghy's work is held in the following permanent collections:

- Corcoran Gallery of Art
- Museum of Modern Art
- George Eastman House
- New York Public Library
- Hallmark Photographic Collection
- Metropolitan Museum of Art
- San Francisco Museum of Modern Art
- Museum of Fine Arts, Houston
- Smithsonian American Art Museum
