= Helen Gee (curator) =

American photography gallery owner

- Born: April 29, 1919; Jersey City, New Jersey, NJ
- Died: October 10, 2004 (aged 85); Manhattan, New York, NY
- Occupations: Photographer, Curator, Lecturer, Writer
- Known for: Limelight Gallery

Helen Gee (1919–2004) was an American photography gallery owner, co-owner of the Limelight in New York City, New York from 1954 to 1961. It was New York City's first important post-war photography gallery, pioneering sales of photographs as art.

In the late 1970s, Gee worked as a photography curator, lecturer and writer.

== Life and work ==
Gee was born Helen Charlotte Wimmer on April 29, 1919 in Jersey City, New Jersey, to father Peter who had been trained as a church decorator before he migrated from Austro-Hungary. Gee's mother Marie (née Ludwig) died during her infancy, and her widower brought up Helen and her older siblings Ella and Henry alone. Rebelling against her father's new wife who had Nazi sympathies, at fifteen she moved to New York City to finish high school and enrol in WPA art classes through which she met, and moved in with, established modernist painter, Yun Gee (1906-1963). They married seven years later in 1942 and had a daughter, artist Li-lan in 1943, and were subsequently divorced in 1947 after Yun Gee's incarceration due to his mental illness. She later married Kevin Sullivan, but that ended in divorce.

In the 1950s, she attended shows curated by Edward Steichen at the Museum of Modern Art, which inspired her interest in photography. After finding work as a photo restorer in the late 1940s, Gee taught herself specialist transparency retouching for commercial and advertising photographers and was able to establish herself in a good apartment and to send Li-lan to private school. Helen Gee bought a Rolleiflex at the suggestion of client Paul Radkai, and enrolled in photography classes with Alexey Brodovitch, then Lisette Model and finally Sid Grossman. With that experience she decided to open a gallery instead of becoming a photographer, and with her own finance she founded and managed the Limelight Gallery in 1954, and in 1956 she traveled briefly to Spain and France with Li-lan after the two had won a television competition.

== Limelight Gallery 1954-61 ==
In May 1954 Gee opened New York City's first important post-war photography gallery. With initial assistance of her sister Ella and brother in-law, she took a ten-year lease at a very low $225 a month on a building on Seventh Avenue South and Barrow Street. Limelight's 20 by 25 foot gallery space, its walls white and the floor black, was supported by a coffee shop seating 150 patrons with revenue from the sale of food and drink in a dining separated from the gallery by a red partition. With most prints selling for between $25 and $60 each (equivalent to $200-$500 in 2019), takings from the gallery sales rarely met expenses as photography was not considered a collectible art form until the 1970s. Nevertheless, the group show Great Photographs sold nearly half of its 45 pictures on exhibition. Gee took 25% commission, and sales up to the gallery's closure totalled about $5,000. Limelight provided many of its exhibitors with their first show, or their first show in New York. The exhibitions attracted regular reviews from John "Jack" Deschin in the New York Times, and less often from "John Adam Knight" (Pierre de Rohan) in the New York Post, Mabel Scacheri of the New York World-Telegram and George Wright in The Village Voice. The latter publication held the first three Obie Awards ceremonies in the café.

The café and gallery was a popular meeting place for commercial, press, freelance, magazine and street photographers of the era, not only the exhibitors, but also other big names of the period; Diane Arbus, Philippe Halsman, Cornell Capa, Weegee (whom Gee banned), Lew Parrella, Morris Jaffe, Jerry Danzig, David Heath, Suzy Harris, Lee Friedlander, Sid Kaplan, John Cohen, Morris Engel, Walt Silver, Harold Feinstein, Paul Seligman, Martin Dain, Leo Stashin, Norman Rothschild, and Victor Obsatz. During the showing of The Family of Man at MoMA (1955), several who were included congregated at Limelight; Arthur Lavine, May Mirin, Hella Hammid, Simpson Kalisher, Ray Jacobs, Ruth Orkin, and Ed Wallowitch.

Although the gallery closed in 1961 due to financial and union pressure, it had pioneered sales of photographs as art, showing the works of prominent contemporary and historic photographers.

=== Limelight exhibition chronology ===
In her gallery Helen Gee organised and presented these sixty-one exhibitions:

==== 1954 ====
- Joseph Breitenbach, Korea, May 13- June 27
- Rudolph Burckhardt, June 29- August 15
- Louis Stettner, August 17- September 27
- Minor White, September 28- November 3
- Grant La Farge, New England in the 1890s, November 6–30
- Great Photographs: Berenice Abbott, Ansel Adams, Edouard Boubat, Bill Brandt, Brassaï, Manuel Álvarez Bravo, Harry Callahan, Imogen Cunningham, Robert Doisneau, Robert Frank, Izis, Lisette Model, Gotthard Schuh, W. Eugene Smith, Paul Strand, Jakob Tuggener, Sabine Weiss, Edward Weston, and Minor White, December 1–30

==== 1955 ====
- David Vestal, January 3-February 14
- Arnold Newman, February 15-March 19
- Eliot Porter, March 21-April 17
- Alfred Stieglitz / Dorothy Norman, Portraits of Each Other, April 19-May 7
- Dan Weiner, Italy, May 10- June 7
- Suzy Harris, June 10- July 25
- Group show: Fourteen Photographers, July 28- September 2
- Wynn Bullock, September 5- October 8
- Laszlo Moholy-Nagy, October 11-November 19
- Édouard Boubat, November 22- December 31

==== 1956 ====
- Leon Levinstein, New York, January 3-February 11
- Ansel Adams, February 14-March 31
- Esther Bubley, April 3-May 5
- Imogen Cunningham, May 8-June 25
- Sabine Weiss, June 28-July 29
- Footlights and Spotlights:Theatrical Photographs of the American Stage, 1860- 1900, loan exhibition from George Eastman House, August 1- September 19
- Ken Heyman, September 21-October 28
- Dan Weiner, South Africa, October 30-December 2
- Eugène Atget, December 4-January 6

==== 1957 ====
- Izis, January 8-February 17
- Frank Paulin, February 19- April 2
- Eliot Porter / Ellen Auerbach, Madonnas and Marketplaces, April 4-May 19
- Elliott Erwitt, May 24-July 7
- Morris H. Jaffe, July 9-August 18
- Lyrical and Accurate, loan exhibition from George Eastman House, designed by Minor White, August 20- September 28
- W. Eugene Smith, October I- November 10
- John Cohen, Peru, November 12-December 15
- Berenice Abbott, Portraits of the Twenties, December 17- January 26

==== 1958 ====
- David ["Chim"] Seymour, Chirn's Children, January 28- February 25
- Rudolph Burckhardt / George Montgomery, February 27- April 10
- Ken Heyman, Bali, Japan, Hong Kong, April 12- May 25
- Bert Stern, May 27-July 20
- James Karales, Rendville, USA, July 24- August 31
- Group show, September 3–30
- Harold Feinstein, October 2-November 15
- Gerda Peterich, Dance Portraits November 18- December 31

==== 1959 ====
- Robert Doisneau, January 5-February 28
- Harry Lapow, March 3-April 12
- Dan Weiner, Russia and Eastern Europe, April 14-May 12
- The History of Photography, loan exhibition from George Eastman House, May 15-June 30
- Group show: Seven Europeans, July 2- August 13
- Group show: Images of Love, August 15-September 30
- Brassaï, The Eye of Paris, October 5–31
- Group show, November 2- December 13
- Louis Faurer, December 15-January 18

==== 1960-1 ====
- Photographs by Professors: Lou Block, Van Deren Coke, Allen Downs, Walter Rosenblum, Aaron Siskind, Henry Holmes Smith, and Minor White, January 19-February 29
- Ralph Hattersley, March 1–27
- Jerry Liebling, April 1-May 15
- Edward Weston, May 17-June 26
- Gordon Parks, June 28-August 7
- Jack Smith, August 9-September 11
- Group show, September 13-October 16
- Claudia Andujar, October 18-Novernber 8
- Paul Caponigro / Minor White, November 10-December 14
- Julia Margaret Cameron, December 16, 1960 – January 31, 1961

=== Exhibitions about Limelight ===
- 1977 Helen Gee and the Limelight: A Pioneering Photography Gallery of the Fifties, Carlton Gallery, New York, February 12-March 8, 1977.
- 2001 Helen Gee and the Limelight: The Birth of the Photography Gallery, 1954-1961 Stephen Daiter Gallery, Chicago.
- 2007 Limelight Gallery and Coffeehouse, 1954-61, Triple Candie Gallery, 500 West 148th Street, New York, New York, Feb 8 - March 18, 2007.

Cover of the 2016 Aperture edition of Helen Gee's autobiography illustrated with a portrait by Arthur Lavine of Gee on her way to the opening of her gallery.

== Limelight: A Memoir ==
In 1997, Gee published her autobiography, itself titled Limelight: A Memoir, reissued in 2016 by Aperture with an introduction by Denise Bethel (formerly Chair of Photographs and Americas, Sotheby's New York). Covering mostly her creation and running of Limelight Gallery, the book provides contemporary insights—and gossip—about the society of Greenwich Village of the period, into the lives and personalities of a number of important photographers including Lisette Model and Robert Frank, notes the effect of McCarthyism on artists' output, and provides a balanced appraisal of Edward Steichen's The Family of Man which launched at the Museum of Modern Art the year following Limelight's opening, and increased attention to the medium.

== Later career ==
Gee married Columbia University professor, Kevin Sullivan, in 1959.

Having committed all her own funds to the gallery and still in debt, Gee sold and closed Limelight on January 31, 1961, after a show of the work of Julia Margaret Cameron. The new owners continued showing photographs for a short period and, failing to attract reviews, soon discontinued them and in turn sold up in less than a year.

Her marriage to Sullivan ended in divorce around this time, but Gee continued to reside and work in Greenwich Village as an independent art agent and as a dealer for both United States and international clients in prints, sculpture, and paintings, and specialising in erotic Japanese Shunga prints.

From May 3–31, 1969 she made a trip to Kyoto, Japan. In 1969 she sponsored a Vietnamese foster child, Nguyen Thi My Le through the Foster Parents Plan Inc., with whom she corresponded until 1972, the letters being translated by the organisation. She again visited Japan in 1975 as a guest of Tokyo Shimbun, a newspaper that sponsored the Yasuo Kuniyoshi exhibit, and she returned in 1986. She also visited China during April 5–26, 1976 touring with the US-China People's Friendship Association.

In the late 1970s, Gee worked as a photography teacher and lecturer at Parsons School of Design, and as a curator and writer. In 1979 she curated Steiglitz and the Photo Secession, a reconstruction of the Photo-Secession exhibition held March 5–22, 1902 at the National Arts Club, New York, for the New Jersey State Museum and the touring Photography of the Fifties: An American Perspective, for which she wrote the catalogue essay, for the Center for Creative Photography.

In 1983, Gee was invited by Michael Spano, director of the Midtown Y Photography Gallery, onto its newly formed board of advisors made up of significant members of the photographic community, including Aaron Siskind, Arthur Leipzig, Larry Fink, and Jeffrey Hoone.

Helen Gee died of pneumonia on October 10, 2004, in Manhattan, New York, N.Y.

Gee's archive of her work and records pertaining to the Limelight Gallery are located at the Center for Creative Photography at the University of Arizona in Tucson, Arizona.

== Publications ==
- Limelight: a Greenwich Village Photography Gallery and Coffeehouse in the Fifties: A Memoir. Albuquerque: University of New Mexico, 1997. ISBN 978-0826318176.
  - Limelight: a Greenwich Village Photography Gallery and Coffeehouse in the 1950s. New York: Aperture, 2016. ISBN 9781597113687. With an introduction by Denise Bethel.
- Gee, H. (1991). 'Limelight: Remembering Gene Smith'. In American Art, 5(4), 10–19.
- Stourdzé, S., Gee, H., Coleman, A. D., & Levinstein, L. (2000). Leon Levinstein. Paris: Scheer.
