= Wallowitch =

Wallowitch is a surname. Notable people with the surname include:

- Edward Wallowitch (1932–1981), American art photographer
- John Wallowitch (1926–2007), American songwriter and cabaret performer
