= Western Colorado =

Western Colorado may refer to:

- Colorado Western Slope, the portion of the U.S. State of Colorado that drains into the Colorado River
- Western Colorado Community College, Grand Junction, Colorado
- Western Colorado University, Gunnison, Colorado
  - Western Colorado Mountaineers, its athletics teams
- Episcopal Diocese of Western Colorado, former

== See also ==
- Western Colorado Botanical Gardens, Grand Junction, Colorado
- Western Colorado Center for the Arts, Grand Junction, Colorado
