= New York School =

New York School may refer to:

- New York School (art), a group of poets and artists of the 1960s
- New York school of photography, an approach to photographing NYC in the mid-20th century
- New York School, a term coined by Ann Mische in the field of 1990s relational sociology

== See also ==
- New York University
- Education in New York
