= Jill Freedman =

American photographer (1939–2019)

- Born: October 19, 1939; Pittsburgh, Pennsylvania, U.S.
- Died: October 9, 2019 (aged 79); New York City, U.S.
- Occupation: Documentary photographer
- Years active: 1966–2017
- Website: www.jillfreedman.com

Jill Freedman (October 19, 1939 – October 9, 2019) was an American documentary photographer and street photographer. She was based in New York City.

== Early life and education ==
Freedman was born in the Squirrel Hill neighborhood of Pittsburgh to a traveling salesman and a nurse. As an adult Freedman photographed extensively in Ireland, quipping "I'm Jewish, but I adopted Ireland as my own old country". In 1961, Freedman graduated from the University of Pittsburgh with a major in sociology. In 1964 Freedman came to New York City and had several temporary jobs including advertising copywriter. She only discovered photography while experimenting with a friend's camera.

== Career ==
After college, Freedman went to Israel, where she worked on a Kibbutz. She ran out of money and sang to make a living; she continued singing in Paris and on a television variety show in London.

Freedman arrived in New York City in 1964, and worked in advertising and as a copywriter. As a photographer, she was self-taught, influenced by André Kertész, idolizing W. Eugene Smith, but primarily helped by her poodle Fang:

When I was out walking in the street with Fang I saw everything, felt everything. He had a great instinct. He taught me how to look, because he never missed a thing.

Andy Grundberg would also note the influences on her style of Smith, Henri Cartier-Bresson, Don McCullin, Leonard Freed, and Weegee; but would add that: "To appreciate [her] photographs one needs to consider their substance, not their style. . . . Human relationships – especially the bonds of brotherhood – fascinate her."

On hearing of the assassination of Martin Luther King, Freedman quit her job and went to Washington, DC. She lived in Resurrection City, a shantytown put up by the Poor People's Campaign on Washington Mall in 1968, and photographed there. Photographs from the series were published at the time in Life, and collected in Freedman's first book, Old News: Resurrection City, in 1970. A. D. Coleman wrote of the book:

It is a very personal yet highly objective statement, filled with passion, warmth, sorrow and humor. Freedman's pictures are deft and strong; her text witty, sardonic and honest, with quirky insights and touching moments of self-revelation. A brave and moving book.

Freedman then lived in a Volkswagen kombi, following the Clyde Beatty-Cole Brothers Circus. For two months, she photographed "two shows a day and one show each Sunday. Seven weeks of one night stands", and moving across New York, Massachusetts, New Jersey, Rhode Island, New Hampshire, Vermont, Pennsylvania and Ohio. She wanted to photograph the performers as people. ("If I wanted to do freaks, I'd do guys wearing ties in 100-degree weather – to me that's freaks." (Note: A temperature of 100 degrees Fahrenheit, or 38 degrees Celsius.)) Coleman wrote:

[The photographs expose] both the photographer's own responses to people and the personalities of her subjects. The moments she selects are significant emotionally as well as graphically. Her images exclude the extraneous in an inconspicuous way, and her sense of timing and gesture . . . is uncanny.

The work was published as a book, Circus Days, in 1975.

Freedman photographed the then sleazy area of 42nd Street and the arts scene in Studio 54 and SoHo.

In 1975, Freedman started to photograph firefighters around Harlem and the Bronx. This took her two years; she lived with the firefighters, sleeping in the chief's car and on the floor. This resulted in a book, Firehouse, published in 1977 – according to one review, a book "flawed . . . by poor reproduction and inept layout".

Some of the firefighters had previously been policemen, and they suggested that Freedman might photograph police work. Freedman had disliked the police but reasoned that there must be good policemen among them. For her series Street Cops (1978–1981), she accompanied the police to an area of New York City including Alphabet City and Times Square, spending time with those who seemed good cops. The work resulted in the book Street Cops. A contemporary reviewer for Popular Photography started by observing that "the passionate photojournalistic essay of yesterday" was "an endangered species", before saying that it lived on in photobooks such as this one. The reviewer described Street Cops as "[celebrating] the heroism, compassion, and humor of New York police professionals", and saying that the book "is traditional and satisfying in that it accomplishes a blend rarely successful – or even attempted – these days: an organic fusion of words and photographs".

On photographing in New York at the time:

Hiding behind a camera, [Freedman] found her subjects where others were not looking – "beggars, panhandlers, people sleeping on the street," the police and the firefighters, the people washed ashore by forces bigger than themselves. "It's the theater of the streets," she said. "The weirder, the better."

During the seventies, Freedman was briefly associated with Magnum Photos, but did not become a member. She wanted to tell stories via photography, but also wanted to avoid the schmoozing required to get commissions; and she therefore set her own tasks. She had difficulty making a living, but sold prints from a stand set up outside the Whitney Museum building. In 1983, New York Times critic Andy Grunberg recognized her black and white street photography in New York, grouping Freedman with Lee Friedlander, Fred R. Conrad, Bruce Davidson, Roy DeCarava, Bill Cunningham, Sara Krulwich and Rudy Burckhardt.

In 1988, Freedman discovered that she was ill. The medical expenses meant that she had to leave her apartment above the Sullivan Street Playhouse; (Note: The Sullivan Street Playhouse occupied 181 Sullivan Street from 1958 to 2002. Durniak, Drew (January 13, 2012). "Sullivan Street Playhouse: Gone but not forgotten". Greenwich Village Society for Historic Preservation.) in 1991, she moved to Miami Beach; she was dissatisfied there but was able to read a lot. She sometimes worked for the Miami Herald. She also managed to publish a photobook of dogs that was praised for "[defying] the clichéd images" of dog photography. She also published the second of two photobooks of Ireland, one that Publishers Weekly said "lovingly captures the enduring aspects of Irish tradition".

Around 2003, (Note: "Five years ago", says a newspaper article published on April 27, 2008; therefore presumably in 2002 or 2003.) Freedman moved back to New York. She was shocked and saddened by its sanitization during her absence: "When I saw that they had turned 42nd Street into Disneyland, . . . I just stood there and wept." She moved to a place near Morningside Park in 2007, and was still living there in 2015.

During the earlier part of her career, Freedman was captivated by the photographic printing process. She shot Kodak Tri-X and liked to use a 35 mm lens and available light, and to print on Agfa Portriga Rapid paper. As of late 2016, she neither had a darkroom nor missed having one: she emphasized that the camera, whether film or digital, was merely a tool. When asked on another occasion, she approvingly cited Elliott Erwitt on not being boring and attempting to do excellent work; technical questions and even posterity should not be a concern.

Freedman was one of 13 photographers shown photographing New York in Everybody Street, a 2013 film by Cheryl Dunn. Together with Richard Kalvar, Alex Webb, Rebecca Norris Webb, Maggie Steber and Matt Stuart, she was a featured guest in the Miami Street Photography Festival 2016 at HistoryMiami Museum during Art Basel week.

Grundberg wrote in 1982 that "Indignation over injustice is the major key in [Freedman's] work, admiration for life's survivors the minor key." Maggie Steber has said of Freedman:

I think she's been thoroughly under-recognized. . . . To me, Jill is one of the great American photographers. Always has been and always will be.

In 2016, Freedman's work and career, especially her images of New York City, was the subject of renewed interest, appearing in multiple Vice articles, including their 2016 photography issue and at Art Basel Miami.

== Personal life ==
In her later life, Freedman lived in Harlem.

On October 9, 2019, Freedman died from complications of cancer at a care facility in Manhattan.

== Awards ==
- 1973: National Endowment for the Arts, Photography Fellowship
- 1974: New York State Council on the Arts, Creative Artists Public Service Program (CAPS) Photography Grant
- 1982: Leica Medal of Excellence (first recipient, with Jill Krementz and Mary Ellen Mark)
- 1994: Alicia Patterson Foundation, Fellowship for The Holocaust, 50 Years Later (Note: For the award-winning work, see Jill Freedman's group of series: "Survivors", "The Reproachful Voices of the Dead", "Judenrein", "Traces of the Past" at the Alicia Patterson Foundation.)
- 2001: Royal Photographic Society, Honorary Fellowship

== Exhibitions ==
=== Solo exhibitions ===
- Jill Freedman: Pictures from New York, The Photographers' Gallery, London, March 1974.
- The Circus and Other Scenes, The Photographers' Gallery, London, June 1974.
- Jill Freedman, The Photographers' Gallery, London, June 1976.
- PhotoGraph Gallery, New York, January 1982.
- University Center Gallery, Drew University, Madison, New Jersey, May 1982.
- Street Cops: Jill Freedman, The Photographers' Gallery, London, September–October 1982.
- Jill Freedman Photographs, Museum of Contemporary Photography, Columbia College, Chicago, December 1984 – January 1985.
- Street Cops, Nikon Salon, Ginza, Tokyo, 1985.
- Jill Freedman: 60's to the present, Witkin Gallery, New York City, December 1996 – January 1997.
- Laughter and Love: A Romp through Ireland, M. J. Ellenbogen Photography, White Plains, NY, March 2006.
- Here and There, A.M. Richard Fine Art, Brooklyn, New York, April–May 2007. Paired with an exhibition, Photographs of 42nd Street, by Andrew Garn.
- Resurrection City 1968, Higher Pictures, New York City, April–May 2008.
- Street Cops 1978–1981, Higher Pictures, New York City, September–October 2011.
- Street Cops, The President's Gallery, John Jay College of Criminal Justice, CUNY, September–October 2012
- Circus Days 1971, Higher Pictures, New York City, January–March 2013.
- Long Stories Short, Steven Kasher Gallery, New York City, September–October 2015. For the most part, previously unpublished examples of Freedman's earlier work.
- Resurrection City, 1968, Steven Kasher Gallery, New York, 2017
- Street Cops 1978–1981, Daniel Cooney Fine Art, New York, September–October 2021.
- Firehouse: The Photography of Jill Freedman, New York City Fire Museum, 2022 – April 2023.

=== Group exhibitions ===
- Circus: The real people, Neikrug Galleries, New York City, May 1972. With Charles Reynolds.
- Soho Photo, New York City, 1972. With Harvey Stein and Mike Levins.
- Rated X, Neikrug Galleries, New York City, June 1972.
- Third Eye Gallery, New York City, March 1976. Black and white photographs of New York; with Helen Buttfield, André Kertész, Ruth Orkin, and others.
- Street Kids, New York Historical Society, New York City, 1978. With Lewis W. Hine, Jacob Riis, Ben Shahn, Alfred Eisenstaedt, Bruce Davidson and Ken Heyman
- Manhattan Portraits, Federal Hall National Memorial, New York City, September 1984. With Laurence Fink, George Malave, Toby Old, Sy Rubin, Ed Fausty and Brian Rose.
- The Animal in Photography, 1843–1985, The Photographers' Gallery, London, June–September 1986.
- Mothers and Daughters, Burden Gallery, May 1987. With Bruce Davidson, Joel Meyerowitz, Niki Berg, Danny Lyon, Kathleen Kenyon and Rosalind Solomon.
- 2 Photographers – 5 Decades, PhotoGraphic Gallery, New York City, June–August 2006. With Arthur Lavine.
- Ireland, PhotoGraphic Gallery, New York City, January–February 2007. With Christy McNamara.
- Circus days, within Bêtes et hommes = Beasts and Men, Grande halle de la Villette, Paris, September 2007 – January 2008.
- Gertrude's/LOT, Pittsburgh Biennial, Andy Warhol Museum, Pittsburgh, December 2011 – January 2012.
- Seriously, Andrew Edlin Gallery, New York City, November 2016 – January 2017.

== Collections ==
Freedman's work is held in the following permanent collections:

- International Center of Photography, New York City: 51 prints
- The Ringling, Sarasota, FL: 49 prints (Note: The catalog does not seem to distinguish among the John and Mable Ringling Museum of Art, the Ringling Art Library, the Circus Museum, and perhaps other related institutions.)
- Bibliothèque nationale de France, Paris: 21 prints
- Moderna Museet, Stockholm: 6 prints
- Center for Creative Photography, Tucson, AZ: 6 prints "from the W. Eugene Smith Collection"

== Publications ==
- Freedman, Jill (1970). Old News: Resurrection City. New York: Grossman. OCLC 231853020.
- Freedman, Jill (1975). Circus Days. New York: Harmony. ISBN 978-0-517-52008-6 – via Internet Archive.
- Freedman, Jill; Smith, Dennis (1977). Firehouse. New York: Doubleday. ISBN 978-0-385-11585-8 – via Internet Archive.
- Freedman, Jill (1982). Street Cops. New York: Harper & Row. ISBN 978-0-060-14874-4.
- Freedman, Jill (1987). A Time that Was: Irish Moments. New York: Friendly Press. ISBN 978-0-914-91909-4 – via Internet Archive.
- Freedman, Jill (1993). Jill's Dogs. San Francisco: Pomegranate. ISBN 978-1-566-40526-3.
- Freedman, Jill (2004). Ireland Ever: The Photographs of Jill Freedman. New York: Harry N. Abrams. ISBN 978-0-810-94340-7 – via Internet Archive. With text by Frank McCourt and Malachy McCourt.
- Freedman, Jill (2016). Greene, Nikki; Larsen, Cooper; Ostrowski, Stephen; Saveri, Lele (eds.). Only Human. New York: 8-Ball Community & Printed Matter. OCLC 965634818. "Gold edition" of 30 copies (each with a print); (Note: Description at Printed Matter of the "gold edition" of Only Human.) 2nd printing of 100. (Note: Description at Printed Matter of the second printing of Only Human.)
- Freedman, Jill (2018). Kasher, Steven (ed.). Resurrection City (2nd ed.). Bologna: Damiani. ISBN 9788862085830. With essays by John Edwin Mason and Aaron Bryant. (Note: Description at Damiani of the second edition of Resurrection City.)
- Freedman, Jill; Smith, Dennis (2022). Nicoliello, Keith (ed.). Firehouse. Designed by Asya Blue Design (2nd ed.). Jill Freedman Irrevocable Trust. ISBN 9798218064013.
