= James Karales =

James H. Karales
- Born: July 15, 1930; Canton, Ohio
- Died: April 1, 2002 (aged 71); Croton-on-Hudson, New York
- Occupations: photographer, photo-essayist
- Notable work: The Selma to Montgomery march in Alabama, 1965.; Dr. King and his daughter Yolanda. Atlanta, 1962.
- Spouse: Monica
- Children: 4

James H. Karales (July 15, 1930, Canton, Ohio – April 1, 2002, Croton-on-Hudson, N.Y.) was an American photographer and photo-essayist best known for his work with Look magazine from 1960 to 1971. At Look he covered the Civil Rights Movement throughout its duration, taking many of the movements memorable photographs, including those of the formation of the Student Nonviolent Coordinating Committee (SNCC) and of Dr. Martin Luther King Jr. and his family. Karales's single best known image is the iconic photograph of the Selma to Montgomery march showing people proudly marching along the highway under a cloudy turbulent sky.

== Career ==
Karales was born in Ohio to a family of Greek immigrants. Although he initially enrolled in Ohio University with the intention of majoring in electrical engineering, Karales switched his major to photography after watching his roommate in the darkroom. He graduated with a bachelor of fine arts degree in 1955, departing Ohio for New York City. He eventually found work as a darkroom assistant for photo-essay photographer W. Eugene Smith at the Magnum photo agency, initially on a two-week assignment making prints for Smith's Pittsburgh essay. He would go on to work for Smith for two years, making more than 7,000 prints and developing expertise both in the darkroom and as a photo-essayist.

After leaving Magnum, Karales produced his own photo essays, including works showing what life was like for the working citizens of Rendville, Ohio, a former stop on the Underground Railroad and one of the few integrated working communities in the United States. His Rendville photo-essay would draw the attention of Edward Steichen and led to a solo exhibition at Helen Gee's Greenwich Village gallery, Limelight. Karales also drew attention from Look for the Rendville essay, and Look would go on to hire him in 1960 to cover and photograph both the civil rights movement and the war in Vietnam. Karales worked for Look until the magazine closed in 1972; afterwards, he worked as a freelance photographer. Before he met Smith, he also created a photo-essay on the Greek-American community in his hometown of Canton, Ohio.

James Karales' estate is represented by the Howard Greenberg Gallery in New York.

=== Civil rights documentation ===
[Karales's 1965 photograph] may very well be the seminal image to come out of the civil rights marches in the South. It is an amazing combination of movement and shadow. It looks like they are marching out of the Red Sea.

— Taylor Branch, author of Parting the Waters: America in the King Years, 1954-63, 2002 interview, Los Angeles Times

One of Karales's first assignments for Look sent him to Student Nonviolent Coordinating Committee headquarters in Atlanta in 1960, where he photographed members undergoing passive resistance training. Later, he documented Dr. King's family life after being given unprecedented access in 1962–63, publishing photographs showing Dr. King explaining to his daughter Yolanda why they could not go to an amusement park and interacting with other noted figures, including Rosa Parks and Jackie Robinson.

In 2013, a book of Karales' photographs, CONTROVERSY AND HOPE: The Civil Rights Movement Photographs of James Karales, was published by the University of South Carolina Press.

== Publications ==
- James Karales. Howard Greenberg Library/Steidl: Göttingen, 2014. ISBN 978-3869304441.
- Cox, Julian; Jacob, Rebekah; Karales, Monica; Young, Andrew (foreword) (2013). Controversy and Hope: The Civil Rights Photographs of James Karales (1st hardback ed.). The University of South Carolina Press. ISBN 978-1-61117-157-0. (also published in paperback, ISBN 978-1-61117-158-7)

== See also ==
- List of photographers of the civil rights movement
