= New York school of photography =

Informal group of mid-20th-century photographers

The New York school of photography is identified by Jane Livingston as "a loosely defined group of photographers who lived and worked in New York City during the 1930s, 1940s and 1950s" and who, although disinclined to commit themselves to any group or belief, "shared a number of influences, aesthetic assumptions, subjects, and stylistic earmarks". Livingston writes that their work was marked by humanism, a tough-minded style, photojournalistic techniques, the influence of film noir and the photographers Lewis Hine, Walker Evans, and Henri Cartier-Bresson; and that it avoided "the anecdotal descriptiveness of most photojournalism" and the egoism of American action painting, and indeed that it was remarkably little influenced by contemporary painting or graphic design (even though a number of its exponents had direct experience of these). Livingston selects as key exponents of the New York school of photography Diane Arbus, Richard Avedon, Alexey Brodovitch, Ted Croner, Bruce Davidson, Don Donaghy, Louis Faurer, Robert Frank, Sid Grossman, William Klein, Saul Leiter, Leon Levinstein, Helen Levitt, Lisette Model, David Vestal, and Weegee.

Other photographers said to be associated with the New York school are Ian Conner, Morris Engel, Harold Feinstein, William Gedney, Ernst Haas Dave Heath, Sy Kattelson, Arthur Leipzig, Ruth Orkin, Homer Page, Walter Rosenblum, Ben Shahn, Louis Stettner, Dan Weiner, Garry Winogrand and Max Yavno.

Livingston argues that the factors giving rise to a New York school included a belief that the arts, and particularly photography, could be used to improve conditions of the working classes, the Photo League, the local presence of editorial offices of a wide variety of picture magazines, exhibition spaces (some of which sometimes showed photographic prints), a background of movie watching, immigration from or a sojourn in Europe.

The notion of a New York school of photography is not universally accepted. Despite the inclusion of a number of the photographers Livingston selected in the Jewish Museum's 2002 exhibition New York: Capital of Photography, (Note: Max Kozloff discusses the exhibition in Daniel Belasco, "Lens of the city", The Jewish Week, May 3, 2002.) Max Kozloff appears to avoid the term in his detailed text for the book that accompanied the exhibition. (Note: The book: Max Kozloff, New York: Capital of Photography (New Haven: Yale University Press, 2002; ISBN 0-300-09332-2 [hard], ISBN 0-300-09445-0 [paper]).) As for those who use the term, Evan Sklar says that "Critics and curators still debate exactly who and what constituted what is often referred to as the New York School of Photography, which is associated with serious-minded images produced in the decades after World War II by a small band of photographers whose subject was nominally the city itself."
