= Arthur Lavine =

American photographer, photojournalist

- Arthur Lavine c. 1956 from an article in Popular Photography
- Born: Arthur Lavine; December 20, 1922; Trenton, New Jersey
- Died: June 27, 2016 (aged 93); Rancho Bernardo, San Diego, U.S.
- Known for: Photography
- Spouse: Rhoda Lavine

Arthur Lavine (December 20, 1922 - June 27, 2016) was an American mid-century photojournalist and magazine photographer who, among other achievements, produced significant documentation of New Caledonia during World War 2.

== Early life ==
Arthur Eli ('Art') Lavine was born December 20, 1922, in Trenton, N.J., the son of Barney and Helen Lavine, and brother of younger sister Audrey, an artist, who died in 1982.

Lavine's first ambition was to become a cinematographer. He had started photographing with a box camera when he was eleven years old, and given a movie camera at age thirteen, he "used it to make home movies with titles like, 'War' and 'Murder'" and in 1939 travelled daily from his home by train to film the World's Fair in Flushing Meadows, which he edited into an hour-long film. He was president of the movie club in high school. However, since no undergraduate courses were available in movie-making, he instead studied drama at the University of North Carolina in Chapel Hill.

== WW2 and New Caledonia ==
In early 1942 when the United States had already entered World War II, Lavine, then a 19-year-old student, received notice to report for military duty, delaying his graduation. He was first assigned to the air corps to learn radio code, but his parents arranged to have him transferred to the army signal corps where he was sent to Astoria, N.Y., to become a darkroom technician.

In April 1944 he was sent to New Caledonia, where he worked at a photo lab in Nouméa. In order to become an official army photographer he was sent to Guadalcanal, in the Solomon Islands, for three months. On return to Nouméa, he was made supervisor of the photo laboratory serving in the rank of Corporal as a non-combatant photographer. Lavine documented the lives of New Caledonians, including the Kanak community, focussing mainly on family groups and children, all pictured during casual encounters in village environments.

His imagery, and that of his amateur colleague Corporal Elmer Williams, was a record of a tumultuous and difficult period of change in the archipelago that also brought the PX, Cuban cigars, ice-cream, refrigerators, sophisticated medical care, liquor, Jeeps, and jazz. Williams' work had been exhibited in late 2006 at the Tjibaou Cultural Centre curated from the Archives of New Caledonia by Dr Prue Ahrens of the University of Queensland, then touring Australia and then the United States, starting in San Diego. There, Arthur Lavine learned of the event through a friend and went to the opening with his own wartime photographs, which have since attracted scholarly interest.

After the War he studied with Clarence White Jr. in Maine, during which time he made his best-known photograph, Working Hands, Bath, Maine, 1947.

== New York ==
In 1948 Lavine moved into his first apartment at Third Avenue and 53rd Street, NYC. Keen to get work, he advanced on his wartime training by joining the workshops and classes of Lisette Model, Alexey Brodovitch, and Berenice Abbott, heeding Model's instruction “to go out in the street and photograph people, getting close and not being afraid.”

His first success was a story on the Philadelphia Zoo that he sold for a Sunday feature. By the 1950s he had "met many magazine editors and quickly started to get assignments,” then joined the Black Star agency to free-lance for more than thirty magazines including Collier's, Esquire, The New York Times Magazine, Glamour, Newsweek, Fortune, Look, Life, and Redbook, shooting much of his work in colour. In 1951 he became member and then officer of the American Society of Magazine Photographers and was a member of the ASMP San Diego Chapter.

== Style and reception ==
=== Style ===
Working in the humanist genre, Lavine had a talent for visually conveying the essentials of each story he illustrated, sometimes to humorous, and always to sympathetic, effect. In the 1940s he personally initiated stories on Trenton, Maine and subway passengers in New York.

=== Recognition ===
Three exhibitions at the Museum of Modern Art featured his imagery, including Working Hands, Bath, Maine, 1947, which shows the hands and arms of two workers, sunlit and muscular, grasping the stout wooden lever to drill into a pipeline. Cropped into a tight vertical, it was selected for Edward Steichen's The Family of Man at the Museum which then toured the world and was seen by 9 million visitors.

=== Reception ===
Recent commentator Marc-Emmanuel Mélon interprets the image as a phallic embodiment of a paternalistic trope in The Family of Man, while W. S. Di Piero calls it "a tough-minded image that fit Steichen's scheme because it depicted the necessity of collaboration and cooperation: its unambiguous import was that we're all in this—the world of work—together." Helen Gee in her autobiography, which his mid-50s pictures of her Limelight Photography Gallery and Coffeehouse in Greenwich Village illustrate, recalls Lavine's "excitement when he saw his picture...enlarged to a monumental nine feet" (it was shot on large format 5" x 4" film), and notes that when the image was prepared as a first edition issue postage stamp, that "even when tiny, it held its own". Lavine's "Working Hands" was suggested by Steichen in for a 1956 Labor Day stamp and was used as a first day cover.

W. S. Di Piero admires Lavine's 'innocent eye' as applied in his street photography, and writes that his "sanguine temperament embraces his subjects but doesn't squeeze the life out of them." Tamara Weintraub finds a subtle beauty in Lavine's early work, made before he had developed a recognisable style, in his New Caledonia imagery and sees "poignant connections these images draw from past to present, and between two seemingly different cultures...[that]...separates Lavine's work from the "souvenir" snapshots or official army photographs taken by other American soldiers at the time."

=== Legacy ===
Lavine's records of the Limelight gallery and café provide a valuable historic record of a vital era in which photography was becoming collectible as an art form in America. As well as the emerging coffee houses, in that decade Lavine's street photography and photojournalism also covered the working class districts of New York, the demolition of the elevated railway, sharecroppers in Virginia for the Newport News, and farm workers in Kansas, Dakota and Nebraska. His 1960s subjects are diverse and include the anti-Vietnam marches and construction of the World Trade Center.

Lavine attended the March 5 opening of his 2008 solo show Arthur Lavine photographe at the Musée de Nouvelle-Calédonie for which two specialists, Kathy Creely of the University of California, and Prudence Ahrens, an art historian from the University of Queensland, produced a catalogue, the first publication of the museum to be devoted to photography.

== Corporate photography ==
Lavine reduced his freelancing in the late '50s to become a corporate staff photographer traveling, widely across America to produce in-house publications, annual reports, press releases and displays, first for four years from 1956 at Western Electric Company, and then from 1960 to 1983 he directed the Chase Manhattan Bank, photography department, which entailed much traveling in the US and abroad, and where he documented the beginnings of business computing. Lavine contributed to financial publications after retiring from Chase, and continued with personal photographic projects.

== Later life ==
In 1992 Lavine settled in San Diego with his wife Rhoda and continued to produce and exhibit reportage, mood pieces and abstract works. Of such images shown in 2007 in Arthur Lavine: peripatetic wanderings and meditations at the Museum of Photographic Arts, Di Piero remarked; "He has always chased the stirrings of light on matter, and so in a way it's appropriate that since moving to San Diego he has made many abstract pictures about the actions of the local light."

Lavine died aged 93 on June 27, 2016, at his Rancho Bernardo home after suffering Alzheimer's disease. He was survived by his wife, two sons and three grandchildren.

An archive of his documents and imagery is held at the Museum of Modern Art, New York.

== Publications ==
=== Books ===
- Cohn, D. L., Scroggs, R., & Lavine, A. (1941). Chapel Hill. Chapel Hill, N.C.: Dialectic and Philanthropic Literary Societies of the University of North Carolina.
- U.S. Camera Annuals '46, '47, '51, '55, '59
- Photography Annuals '52, '53, '54, '70, '71
- Steichen, Edward; Sandburg, Carl; Norman, Dorothy; Lionni, Leo; Mason, Jerry; Stoller, Ezra; Museum of Modern Art (New York) (1955). The family of man: The photographic exhibition. Published for the Museum of Modern Art by Simon and Schuster in collaboration with the Maco Magazine Corporation.
- Rothstein, Arthur (1956), Photojournalism : pictures for magazines and newspaper[s] (1st ed.), American Photographic Book Publishing
- National Committee for Children and Youth; Buck, Pearl S. (Pearl Sydenstricker), 1892-1973; White House Conference on Children and Youth, 1960 (1964), The joy of children : based on the photographic exhibit prepared for the 1960 White House conference on children and youth, Day
- Gee, H. (1991). 'Limelight: Remembering Gene Smith'. American Art, 5(4), 10–19.
- Photographs in Gee, Helen (1997), Limelight : a Greenwich Village photography gallery and coffeehouse in the fifties : a memoir (1st ed.), University of New Mexico Press, ISBN 978-0-8263-1817-6
- Lavine, Arthur; Neaoutine, Marie-Solange, (director of publication.); Cayrol-Baudrillart, Françoise; Musée de Nouvelle-Calédonie (issuing body.) (2008), Arthur Lavine photographe, Nouvelle-Calédonie, première source d'Inspiration = Arthur Lavine's pacific inspiration early photographs in New Caledonia, Nouméa Musée de la Nouvelle-Calédonie, ISBN 978-2-918071-00-6
- Ahrens, Prue; Creely, Kathryn (2008-01-01), Arthur Lavine and American modernism in the Pacific, Musée de Nouvelle-Calédonie
- Bera, S., Lavine, A., Indie Photobook Library/Larissa Leclair Collection (Beinecke Rare Book and Manuscript Library), & Blurb (Firm),. (2011). California cell.

=== Magazine photography ===
Lavine contributed photographs to numbers of magazines including:

- Amerika (USIA)
- Architectural Forum
- Burroughs Clearing House
- Business Week
- Collier's
- Coronet
- Ebony
- Esquire
- Farm Quarterly
- Forbes
- Fortune
- Glamour
- Institutional Investor
- Jubilee
- Ladies' Home Journal
- Look
- LIFE
- Modern Photography
- Newsweek
- The New York Times Magazine
- Pageant
- Parade
- Photo District News
- Photography
- Post
- Redbook
- The Saturday Evening Post
- Technical Photography
- This Week
- Time
- Town Journal
- Vogue

== Collections ==
- The International Center of Photography, New York City
- Art Institute of Chicago
- Museum of Fine Arts, Houston
- Bibliothèque nationale de France

== Exhibitions ==
=== Solo ===
- 1969: Eye on Wall Street, One Chase Manhattan Plaza.
- 1970: Image Photographic Laboratory Gallery, NYC
- 1997: Photo Factory Gallery, San Diego, CA
- 1998: Continuing Education Center at Rancho Bernardo, San Diego
- 1999: Images of Israel and New York ('99) Photo Factory Gallery, San Diego, CA
- 2001: Photo Factory Gallery, San Diego
- 2003: Arthur Lavine fotografien: 1940 - 1970, Photogalerie 94, Switzerland, May 31– Jun 29
- 2003: The Inclusive Eye, Boehm Gallery, San Marcos, July 18 –Aug. 29
- 2007: Arthur Lavine: peripatetic wanderings and meditations, Museum of Photographic Arts, 12 May – 2 Sep
- 2007: Arthur Lavine: nimble witness, 4 Walls Gallery, San Diego, CA, May 12–Sep 2.
- 2008: Arthur Lavine photographe, Musée de Nouvelle-Calédonie, Nouméa, Mar 4–June 12
- 2009: Eye on Wall Street, Seaport District Cultural Association, October 1 – October 30
- 2012/13: solo show, Vista Library, 700 Eucalyptus Ave, San Diego, November 4–January 6

=== Group ===
- 1951: Abstraction in Photography, The Museum of Modern Art, May 1–July 4
- 1951/2: Christmas Photographs, November 29, 1951 – January 6, 1952, The Museum of Modern Art
- 1954: Village Camera Club, New York - group show with Arthur Leipzig, Sol Libsohn and David Linton
- 1955: The Family of Man, Museum of Modern Art, 24 Jan – 8 May and touring worldwide.
- 1955: Fourteen Photographers, Limelight gallery, Greenwich Village, New York, July 28–September 2
- 1950s: American Society of Magazine Photographers (ASMP) exhibits, including one at the New York Coliseum
- 1960: These Are Our Children, White House Conference on Children and Youth, Washington, D.C.
- 1960s: (7 exhibitions held throughout) Chase Manhattan Bank, NYC.
- 1969: The World of Color, Union Carbide, NYC.
- 1973: Bergen Community Museum, Paramus, NJ.
- 1976: Nikon House Gallery, NYC - Chase Manhattan Photography
- 1976: Images of Industry, Kodak Gallery, NYC and Eastman House, Rochester, New York
- 1977: Helen Gee and the Limelight: A Pioneering Photography Gallery of the Fifties, Carlton Gallery, February 12-March 8
- 1981: Portrait of a Building, Chase Manhattan Bank, New York
- 1991: National Gallery of Canada, Ottawa - Limelight photo in traveling Lisette Model retrospective, international tour Feb 18, 1991–Apr. 20, 1992, Canada tour; Aug 10, 1991–Oct 14, 1992.
- 1997-98: Mercy Hospital, San Diego, CA - three group shows, two shows curated by Lavine
- 1998: Take the A Train, Howard Greenberg Gallery, NYC.
- 1998: ASMP Showcase '98, Framemaker Gallery, San Diego, CA (group show dedicated to Lavine)
- 1999-2001: Museum of Photographic Arts, San Diego - five different exhibits from the museum's 2001 permanent collection
- 2001: Helen Gee and the Limelight: The Birth of the Photography Gallery, 1954-1961 Stephen Daiter Gallery, Chicago.
- 2006: New York City - 2 Photographers, 5 Decades: Jill Freedman, Arthur Lavine, with photographs from the 1940s and 50s by Arthur Lavine, and the 1960s to 1980s by Jill Freedman, Photographic Gallery, Jun 10–Aug 27
- 2008: The Art of Photography Show 2008, San Diego Art Institute, San Diego, California.
- 2009: The Art of Photography Show 2009, San Diego Art Institute, San Diego, California.
- 2010: Point of View, group exhibition with Janine Free, Dana Levine, Lev Tsimring, John Valois, and Phyllis Weiss, Gallery 21, Spanish Village Art Center, San Diego, July 7–July 19
- 2013: Lavine/Levine: Relative Viewpoints, Gotthelf Art Gallery, September 11 - November 27
- 2014: Experiments in Abstraction, Keith de Lellis Gallery, 17 Sep – 31 Oct
- 2015: Architectural Abstractions: Vintage Photographs of New York, Keith de Lellis Gallery, 17 Sep – 31 Oct
- 2015-2016: Behind the Lens: Interpretive Presence in Photography, Western Colorado Center for the Arts, November 25-January 23
- 2017: Street Photography around the World, Gallery 21, Spanish Village Art Center, San Diego, March 22–April 3
- 2017: The Photograph as Witness: The American Cultural Landscape, Museum Photographic Arts, 1 Sep – 31 Oct
