= Ted Croner =

American photographer (1922-2005)

- Croner's New York at Night, 1948 on the cover of Jane Livingston's The New York School: Photographs 1936–1963 (1992)
- Born: December 5, 1922; Baltimore, Maryland
- Died: August 15, 2005 (aged 82); Manhattan, New York City
- Occupation: Photographer

Ted Croner (December 5, 1922 – August 15, 2005) was an American photographer, described as an influential member of the New York school of photography during the 1940s and 1950s. His images are said to represent the best example of this movement.

== Biography ==
Born in Baltimore in 1922 and raised in North Carolina, Croner developed an interest in photography while in high school. He honed his skills while serving as an aerial photographer in World War II before settling in New York City in 1947. At the urging of fashion photographer Fernand Fonssagrives, he enrolled in Alexey Brodovitch’s class at The New School where he studied with Diane Arbus, Richard Avedon and Lisette Model. During this period he produced many of his most memorable images including “Taxi, New York Night, 1947–48”, which appears on the cover of Bob Dylan’s 2006 album, Modern Times. Another of Croner's photographs was used on the cover of Luna's album Penthouse.

Croner also had a successful career as a fashion and commercial photographer – his work was published in Harper's Bazaar and Vogue. He also worked extensively with corporations such as Coca-Cola and Chase Manhattan Bank.

Croner is best known for his haunting night images of New York City taken in the 1940s and 1950s. He was one of several important photographers who belonged to the New York school of photography.

== Exhibitions ==
Croner's first exhibition was in 1948 as part of the group show, In and Out of Focus: A Survey of Today’s Photography at the Museum of Modern Art (MoMA) in New York City, organized by Edward Steichen. His work was also included in another group exhibition at MoMA in the same year, Four Photographers: Lisette Model, Harry Callahan, Ted Croner, and Bill Brandt.
