= Fritz Neugass =

German-American art critic and photographer (1899–1979)

Fritz Neugass (March 28, 1899, Mannheim–June 1979, New York City) was a German art critic and photographer.

== Early life ==
Fritz Neugass was of Jewish origin. His father Julius Neugass (1869-1939) was an ear, nose and throat specialist in Mannheim. Neugass took part in World War I in 1917, but was released in 1918 after being seriously injured. Influenced by the Wandervogel youth movement, he temporarily turned to Protestantism.

== Art historian ==
From 1919 he studied art history and archeology in Munich, Berlin and Bonn and completed his doctorate in 1924, writing a thesis on Gothic choir stalls, supervised by art historian Carl Neumann (1860-1934) in Heidelberg.

In 1925 he was a volunteer at the Deutschen Archäologischen Institut (German Archaeological Institute) in Rome and then in Florence and participated in excavations on Sicily.

== Photographer and journalist ==
In 1926 he settled in Paris and became a photographer and correspondent for numerous German and international newspapers. He reported for the Berliner Tageblatt, the Vossische Zeitung, Cicerone Press, Kunst, and especially Weltkunst. He became known for his reviews for world art and reports on the current Paris art scene. In addition to exhibition reports and essayistic works he wrote knowledgeable monographs on artists including de Chirico, Matisse, Pissarro, and Cézanne. In autumn 1933 he was romantically involved with Luise Straus-Ernst, first wife of Max Ernst (m. 1918–1927), who had fled to Paris. From 1933-39, he set out as a photographer and correspondent traveling widely and reported for English, American, French and Swiss newspapers mainly on travel and politics in Mediterranean countries.

Shortly after the outbreak of the Second World War Neugass was interned in the camp Fort Carré in Antibes. In November 1939 he was transferred to Les Milles near Aix-en-Provence. There he met amongst others Max Ernst, Walter Hasenclever and Lion Feuchtwanger. In 1939, under the pseudonym "François Neuville" he wrote the novel Das Geheimnis um die Venus (‘The Mystery about Venus’), originally planned as a movie starring the actor Raimu, which appeared in two separate Swiss newspapers. In the spring of that year he joined the French army.

As a journalist, he was accused by the Vichy regime in 1941 of distributing enemy propaganda and sentenced. In order to forestall the impending expulsion to Germany, he emigrated in late 1941 via Casablanca and Cuba to the United States.

== Life in the United States ==
From 1942 to 1947 Neugass worked in various bookstores and for the Red Cross. In 1944 he married librarian Lotte Labus who had earned her own Ph.D in Berlin, and he was granted American citizenship in 1947 and freelanced for several magazines, including articles illustrated with his own photographs ’Window Shopping With Your Camera’ for Popular Photography. and 'Portraiture with Match and Candle' for The American Annual of Photography In the 1950s he wrote for various European newspapers Frankfurter Allgemeine Zeitung, Handelsblatt, Aufbau, and Art News and was the American correspondent to the Swiss Camera magazine in which, in writing on 'The photographers of the United Nations' he expressed the opinion that “The aim of the United Nations is identical with that which lies closest to the hearts of photographers: to bring the nations closer together through mutual understanding,”

== Exhibitions ==
Neugass became a member of the American Society of Magazine Photographers and was exhibited in the Village Camera Club. He traveled to Mexico to make ethnological photographic documentation of rural life in 1953 which was shown in an exhibit at the American Museum of Natural History in 1954. His photography was featured by Edward Steichen in two exhibitions at the Museum of Modern Art; Abstraction in Photography, May 1–July 4, 1951 which featured his photographs of New York skyscrapers reflected in puddles, windows and on car duco, and The Family of Man January 24–May 8, 1955, his contribution to the latter being made on Coney Island of swimsuit-clad couples embracing on the beach. The photograph later illustrated a 1979 book on body language.

== Legacy ==
Neugass' late work as a journalist included critical evaluations of the buying policy of the museums and strategies of the art market. Due to failing health, in January 1979, Neugass turned down their offer to be American editor for the German magazine Kunst. He died in June. A memorial exhibit of Neugass' work was held on the 15th of October 1979 at Goethe House in New York City.

His estate is kept in the University at Albany, New York and was compiled by Lotte Neugass (née Labus) prior to their deposit there in the M.E. Grenander Department of Special Collections. There are approximately 4500 original photographs by Neugass in the collection.

== Publications ==
- Fritz Neugass Antike Kunst in Algerien, von Fritz Neugass, Note : Note : Sonderabzug aus die Antike. VIII. 1932. (S. l. n. d.). pages 138-150.
- Fritz Neugass Bucheinbände der pariser Nationalbibliothek.
- Goethe et l'Italie [signé Fritz Neugass] extract from la Revue bleue, 19 mars 1932
- Neugass, Fritz (1927), Mittelalterliches chorgestühl in Deutschland, J. H. E. Heitz
- Dossiers biographiques Boutillier du Retail. Documentation sur Stefan George. Paris: La Grande revue: Comoedia : Nouvelles littéraires, etc., 1927-1944
