= Jesse Kalisher =

American art photographer

Jesse Kalisher (June 22, 1962 – July 20, 2017) was an American art photographer.

== Background ==
Jesse Kalisher was barely six years old when he received his first camera. It was a birthday gift from his father, the photographer Simpson Kalisher. Although Jesse was raised by his mother Ilse, he worked with Simpson in the darkroom and later served as his assistant.

Despite his early interest in photography, Kalisher embarked on a decade long career in marketing and advertising, working for companies including BBDO, Grey Advertising, The Clorox Company, and J. Walter Thompson. Unfulfilled, he decided to leave the industry and spend a few months traveling. During a trip to Vietnam, Kalisher rediscovered his passion for photography, propelling him down the path to a new career as a fine art photographer.

== Career and work ==
Kalisher's photography is included in the permanent collections of American museums including the George Eastman Museum, the M. H. de Young Memorial Museum, the Ackland Art Museum, and the Museum of Fine Arts, Houston. The first photographs of Barack Obama acquired by the Smithsonian were Kalisher's. Additionally, his photography has been exhibited in numerous galleries and several museums, including the Oakland Museum of California and Chicago's Field Museum.

His work can also be found in hotels across the globe, including Hyatt, Hilton, and Sheraton. Prints of his fine art photography are sold at popular American travel destinations including the Grand Canyon, the Golden Gate Bridge, and the Empire State Building.

Kalisher's photos have been published in periodicals including The New York Times, Art Business News, Black and White magazine, Art & Living Magazine and Interior Design Magazine. His book If You Find the Buddha, published by Chronicle Books in 2006, includes 93 images captured in Thailand and the US that depict Buddha as part of everyday life.

Kalisher was a faculty member at Maine Media Workshops, teaching an advanced course in black and white photography. He has dispensed photography tips through YouTube videos and shares the stories behind some of his favorite shots on his blog. He has made TV appearances and radio broadcasts. He has been a frequent guest on National Public Radio, serving as a commentator for Marketplace and telling stories for Day to Day, Weekend America, The Savvy Traveler, and the State of Things. He has also led photography expeditions for Regent Seven Sea Cruises and Paul Gauguin Cruises.

Kalisher was the founder and President of Kalisher, an eponymous art gallery. Based in Carrboro, North Carolina, Kalisher was a provider of art for the hospitality industry.

Kalisher was a 1984 graduate of Northwestern University.
