= Jane Livingston =

American art curator (born 1944)

Jane Shelton Livingston (born 12 February 1944) is an American art curator. She is the author and co-author of numerous books and catalogs.

== Life and work ==
Livingston was born in Upland, California.

From 1967 to 1975, she was curator of 20th-century art at the Los Angeles County Museum of Art. She was editor of the Richard Diebenkorn Catalogue Raisonné and as of 2011 was working as an independent curator.

In 1975 she became associate director and chief curator at the Corcoran Gallery of Art, but resigned in 1989, prompted by the Corcoran's cancellation of a show of work by photographer Robert Mapplethorpe. Livingston had been on sabbatical, writing a book under a Guggenheim Fellowship when the exhibition was cancelled; when she returned, she made it clear that she would not have cancelled the show. Livingston had arranged the installation, which was financed in part by the National Endowment for the Arts (NEA).

She organized a major museum exhibition of Chicano art, and, together with Marcia Tucker, the first major museum exhibition of Bruce Nauman. Other exhibitions include her show of National Geographic, "illustrative" photography. She and curator John Beardsley also curated an exhibition of black outsider artists in 1982. This show "marked an explosion of interest in the work of African American artists." Livingston's The New York School of Photography (1992) has been described as a "path-breaking study", first identifying the titular subject. Livingston curated a show of John Alexander's works at the Smithsonian American Art Museum in 2008.

Livingston's work on The Art of Richard Diebenkorn (1997) helped produce a book that collected the most important works of Richard Diebenkorn, who had been under-represented in publishing. The catalogue raisonné she compiled on the artist appeared in 2016.

== Publications ==
- Livingston, Jane (1972). Bruce Nauman: Work from 1965 to 1972. Los Angeles: Los Angeles County Museum of Art. ISBN 9780875870519.
- Livingston, Jane; Beardsley, John; Perry, Regenia (1982). Black Folk Art in America, 1930–1980. Jackson: University Press of Mississippi. OCLC 564711070.
- Livingston, Jane (1984). Ad Reinhardt. Washington, D.C.: Corcoran Gallery of Art. OCLC 563138463.
- Livingston, Jane; Krauss, Rosalind E.; Adès, Dawn (1985). L'Amour Fou: Photography & Surrealism. New York: Abbeville Press. OCLC 560453860.
- Livingston, Jane; Elderfield, John; Fine, Ruth (1997). The Art of Richard Diebenkorn. Los Angeles: University of California Press. ISBN 9780520212572.
- Livingston, Jane (1992). The New York School: Photographs, 1936–1963. New York: Stewart, Tabori & Chang. ISBN 9781556702396.
- Livingston, Jane (1994). The Art of Photography at National Geographic. Köln: Evergreen/Benedikt Taschen. ISBN 9783822893111.
- Livingston, Jane; Nochlin, Linda; Lee, Yvette Y. (2002). The Paintings of Joan Mitchell. Berkeley: University of California Press. ISBN 9780520235687.
- Livingston, Jane; Greene, Alison de Lima (2008). John Alexander–A Retrospective. Houston: Museum of Fine Arts, Houston. ISBN 9780300125061.
- Cohen, Mark; Livingston, Jane (2015). Frame—A Retrospective. Austin: University of Texas Press. ISBN 9781477303726. Archived from the original on 2021-02-28.
- Livingston, Jane (2016). Richard Diebenkorn: The catalogue raisonné. New Haven: Yale University Press. ISBN 9780300184501.
