= Frank Paulin =

American artist

Frank Paulin (August 3, 1926 – June 11, 2016) was born in Pittsburgh was an American artist and photographer. Paulin grew up in New York City and Chicago. At the age of 16 in 1942, his photographic education began as an art apprentice at Whittaker-Christiansen Studio, Chicago. In 1944, Paulin joined the Army, spending two years in the Signal Corps in Europe. During this time, Paulin developed his documentary artistic style by photographing wartime devastation of German cities. In 1946, Paulin returned to Chicago and enrolled at the Institute of Design, By the end of the 1950s, Frank Paulin's educational resume included studies at the New School under the renowned art director Alexey Brodovitch. In 1957, Paulin celebrated his first solo artist exhibition at the Limelight Gallery. Frank Paulin died in 2016.

== Exhibitions ==
- 2010 'Discoveries.' Bruce Silverstein Gallery, New York, NY.
- 2010 'Frank Paulin: An American Documentarian.' Lowe Art Museum, Miami, FL.
- 2008 'Frank Paulin: Out of the Limelight.' Bruce Silverstein Gallery, New York, NY.
- 2006- 2007 ‘New York at Night: Photographs from the collection.’ The Museum of Modern Art, New York, NY
- 2006 ‘Thirty Days of Fashion.’ Hearst Building Atrium, New York, NY
- 2005-2006 ‘Frank Paulin: Moments.’ Duncan Miller Gallery, Los Angeles, CA
- 2005 ‘Paris in Black and White.’ Duncan Miller Gallery, Los Angeles, CA
- 2005 ‘By the Sea.’ Yossi Milo Gallery, New York, NY
- 2003 ‘Frank Paulin: Limelight.’ Bruce Silverstein Gallery, New York, NY
- 2002 ‘The New Bauhaus: 1930-1971.’ Bruce Silverstein Gallery, New York, NY
- 2002 ‘Where is Elvis?’ Howard Greenberg Gallery, New York, NY
- 2002 ‘Helen Gee: The Limelight Years 1954-1961.’ Sarah Morthland Gallery, New York, NY
- 1998 ‘Take the A train.’ Howard Greenberg Gallery, New York, NY
- 1997 ‘The Streets and Beyond: New York Photography, 1900-1960.’ The museum of the City of New York, New York, NY
- 1997 ‘Car Culture: The Automobile in the 20th Century Photography (a.k.a. Photography and the Automobile: Before and After the War).’ Howard Greenberg Gallery, New York, NY
- 1997 ‘Kissing.’ Howard Greenberg Gallery, New York, NY
- 1994 ‘ The Street Walkers: Leo Levinstein and Frank Paulin.’ Howard Greenberg Gallery, New York, NY
- 1960 ‘New York VU Par.’ Centre Culturel Americain, Paris, France
- 1957 ‘Photographs by Franks Paulin.’ Limelight Gallery, New York, NY

== Collections ==
- Austin Peay State University, Clarksville, TN
- Center for Creative Photography. University of Arizona, Tucson, AZ
- City of New York. Facades of the Court Houses (25) of all Five Boroughs
- City of New York. Official Portraits (150) of the Sitting Judges of the Court System (Supreme, Surrogate and Appellate) Patricia and Philip Frost Art Museum. Florida International University, Miami, FL
- Hungarian Museum of Photography. Kecskemet, Hungary
- Lowe Art Museum, University of Miami, Coral Gables, FL
- Marlboro College. Marlboro, VT
- Milwaukee Art Museum. Milwaukee, WI
- Museum of Fine Arts. Houston, TX
- Museum of Modern Art. New York City
- Museum of the City of New York. New York City
- Picker Art Gallery. Colgate University, Hamilton, NY
- Yale University Art Gallery. New Haven, CT
- Whitney Museum of American Art. New York, NY
- Hunter Museum of American Art, Chattanooga, TN
