= Leon Levinstein =

American photographer

Leon Levinstein (1910–1988) was an American street photographer best known for his work documenting everyday street life in New York City from the 1950s through the 1980s. In 1975 Levinstein was awarded a Guggenheim Fellowship from the John Simon Guggenheim Memorial Foundation.

== Early life and education ==
Levinstein was born on 20 September 1910 in Buckhannon, West Virginia. He began high school in September 1923 at Baltimore City College, which was a public college-preparatory school. During his senior year in high school, he attended evening classes at the Maryland Institute of Arts in Baltimore. In the autumn of 1927, after graduating from high school, he enrolled as a part-time student at the Institute, taking courses in drawing, calligraphy, and design. In his application for a Guggenheim Fellowship he mentioned taking courses at the Art Institute of Pittsburgh.

== Career ==
Levinstein's first job in advertising was with the Hecht Furniture Company in downtown Baltimore. From 1934 to 1937 he worked there as an assistant art director, doing layouts for newspaper advertisements. He then set out on his own as a freelance graphic artist and designer. Layouts were to be his forte throughout his career in advertising. In the autumn of 1948 he took an advanced workshop with the school's director and one of its most influential teachers, Sid Grossman. As a walker and a loner, it was only natural that Levinstein would prowl the streets of New York and the beaches of Coney Island, like numerous photographers before him. Levinstein was studying with Grossman in 1950 when Lisette and Evsa Model attended the class, and from 1954 until 1960 Levinstein was a student in Evsa Model's painting workshop.

One of his photographs was included in U.S. Camera Annual 1951, and two were chosen the following year. In 1956 he was among six featured photographers of the annual, together with Richard Avedon, Wynn Bullock, G.E. Kidder Smith (an architectural photographer), Eugene Smith, and Brett Weston. Over the course of the decade, his work would also be in five Popular Photography annuals. In 1952 he was the winner of Popular Photography's international photography contest, with a prize of $2,000.

.In 1955 Levinstein's work was included in a summer group exhibition there, and in the same year Edward Steichen selected two of his photographs for the world-touring Museum of Modern Art exhibition The Family of Man, seen by 9 million visitors and for the accompanying catalogue, which is still in print. The two candid photographs were shot at close quarters, his habitual approach, for which he would shoot from the hip, and one is a ground-level view of a well-to-do couple waiting for a cab, she in her voluminous fur and he in his double-breasted suit and hat. The other is more sympathetic to the less privileged people Levinstein enjoyed photographing on the Lower East Side; an African-American woman adoringly caressing her baby as they sprawl on a rug in the dappled shade.

Another supporter was Helen Gee, the founder of the Limelight Gallery, the first New York gallery devoted solely to the exhibition and sale of photographs. In her autobiography, Gee devotes the first part of chapter 13 to Levinstein and his was the first exhibition of 1956, his only solo show at Limelight, with sixty-five prints covering seven years of work by "a photographer I considered one of the best of the non-professionals. Perhaps, even the best." Like Gee, Levinstein had studied photography with Sid Grossman, first at the Photo League and then in Grossman’s private workshops; “he was the only one…who lived up to Sid’s frequent exhortation: ‘Live for photography!’”. There were favourable reviews, one by Wright from The Village Voice. In 1980, Gee included his work in the exhibition Photography of the Fifties. The following year she was instrumental in arranging the sale of a substantial number of prints to the art dealer Harry Lunn.

In the late 1970s and 1980s Levinstein travelled abroad to photograph, only to return to the United States and stay in his Baltimore apartment. Lunn purchased a large group of Levinstein's photographs, and his work was being included in important exhibitions of postwar documentary photography, beginning in 1978 with New Standpoints at the Museum of Modern Art.

Still not widely known, Levinstein has gradually come to be acknowledged as a key figure in photography from the latter half of the twentieth century.

== Publications ==
- Black Through Time: Photographs of Black Urban Life 1937-1973. Charlottesville: Bayly Art Museum, University of Virginia, 1992. Text by Stephen Marguilies.
- Leon Levinstein: The Moment of Exposure. University of Chicago Press, 1995. Bob Shamis and Max Kozloff. ISBN 9780888846402. Catalogue for an exhibition at the National Gallery of Canada, Ottawa, and at the Museum of Modern Art, New York, 1995.
- Leon Levinstein. Obsession. Léo Scheer, 2000. By Helen Gee. ISBN 978-2914172110. French.
- Leon Levinstein: That's Where The Life Is. Stephen Daiter Gallery, 2001. By Helen Gee.
- Leon Levinstein. Göttingen: Steidl, 2014. ISBN 978-3-86930-443-4. Edited by Howard Greenberg and Bob Shamis. With an introduction by Jeff L. Rosenheim and an essay by Carrie Springer.

== Award ==
- 1975: Guggenheim Fellowship from the John Simon Guggenheim Memorial Foundation.

== Collection ==
Levinstein's work is held in the following permanent collection:

- Metropolitan Museum of Art, New York
