= David Vestal =

American photographer (1924–2013)

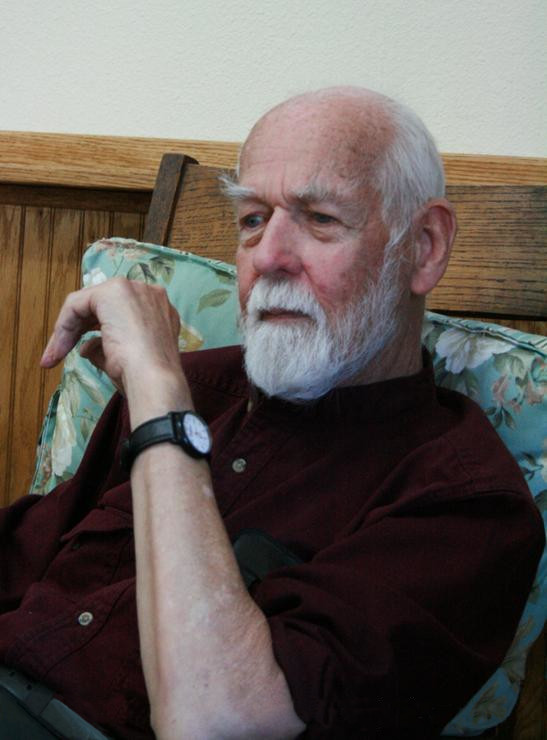
David Vestal lecturing at a photography workshop in Condon, MT.

David Vestal (March 21, 1924 – December 5, 2013) was an American photographer of the New York school, a critic, and teacher.

== Career ==
Vestal was born on March 21, 1924, in Menlo Park, California. He studied painting at the Art Institute of Chicago but took up photography during the late 1940s after moving to New York where the majority of his street photography and cityscapes were made.

From the mid-fifties Vestal exhibited his photography and was included in eight exhibitions at the Museum of Modern Art in New York, where his work is included in its collections and at the Metropolitan Museum of Art, the Whitney Museum of American Art, and the Art Institute of Chicago. He was the recipient of John Simon Guggenheim Fellowships in 1966 and 1973.

A lifelong educator, he taught at Parsons School of Design, the School of Visual Arts, and at Pratt Institute, and also gave numerous lectures and workshops around the country.

A frequent writer on the medium, his column, "Vestal at Large," was a regular feature in Photo Techniques magazine, and his books include The Art of Black and White Enlarging (1984) and The Craft of Photography (1975).

Vestal died on December 14, 2013, at his home in Bethlehem, Connecticut.

== Publications ==
- David Vestal. The Craft of Photography. New York: Harper and Row, 1975. ISBN 0060144971.
  - Updated edition. New York: Harper and Row, 1975. ISBN 0060906227.
- David Vestal. The Art of Black and White Enlarging. New York: Harper and Row, 1984. ISBN 0061818968.
- Douglas O. Morgan, David Vestal and William L. Broecker, eds. Leica Manual: The Complete Book of 35mm Photography. 15th ed. Hastings-on-Hudson, New York: Morgan & Morgan, 1973. ISBN 978-0871000033.

== Exhibitions ==
=== Solo exhibitions ===
- Limelight Gallery, David Vestal, January 3-February 14, 1955
- 1987: Galeria del Bosque, Guadalajara, Mexico
- 1987: Salon de la Plastica Mexican, Mexico
- 1988: Casa de la Cultura Jalisciense, Guadalajara, Mexico
- 1989: Daytona Beach Community College, Daytona, FL
- 1989: Casa de la Cultura Jalisciense, Guadalajara, Mexico
- 2001: A Quiet Light, Robert Mann Gallery, New York, NY
- 2010: Once Upon A Time In New York, Robert Mann Gallery, New York, NY.

=== Group exhibitions ===
- The Museum of Modern Art, Steichen Gallery Reinstallation, April 2, 1971
- The Museum of Modern Art, Recent Acquisitions: Photography, October 6, 1965 – January 9, 1966
- The Museum of Modern Art, Recent Acquisitions, December 21, 1960 – February 5, 1961
- The Museum of Modern Art, Photographs for Collectors, October 1–16, 1960
- The Museum of Modern Art, 70 Photographers Look at New York, November 27, 1957 – April 15, 1958
- The Museum of Modern Art, Christmas Photographs, November 29, 1951 – January 6, 1952
- The Museum of Modern Art, Photographs by 51 Photographers, August 1–September 17, 1950
- The Museum of Modern Art, Color Photography, May 9–July 4, 1950

== Collections ==
- J. Paul Getty Museum
- Museum of Modern Art, New York, NY
- Whitney Museum of American Art, New York, NY
- Metropolitan Museum of Art, New York
- New York Public Library, New York, NY
- Art Institute of Chicago, Chicago, IL
- George Eastman House, Rochester, NY
- RIT, Rochester, NY
- University of New Mexico Art Museum, Albuquerque, NM
- Museum of New Mexico, Santa Fe, NM
- Museum of Fine Arts, St. Petersburg, FL
- Museum of Fine Arts Houston, TX
- Center for Creative Photography, University of Arizona, Tucson, AZ
- National Gallery of Canada, Ottawa, Canada
- University of Louisville, KY
- High Museum of Art, Atlanta, GA
- Hallmark Collection, Kansas, MO
