= Otis Oldfield =

American painter

Otis William Oldfield
- Born: July 3, 1890; Sacramento, California, U.S.
- Died: May 18, 1969 (aged 78); San Francisco, California, U.S.
- Education: Best’s Art School, Académie Julian
- Occupations: painter, muralist, printmaker, educator
- Spouse: Helen Clark (m. 1926–1969; death)

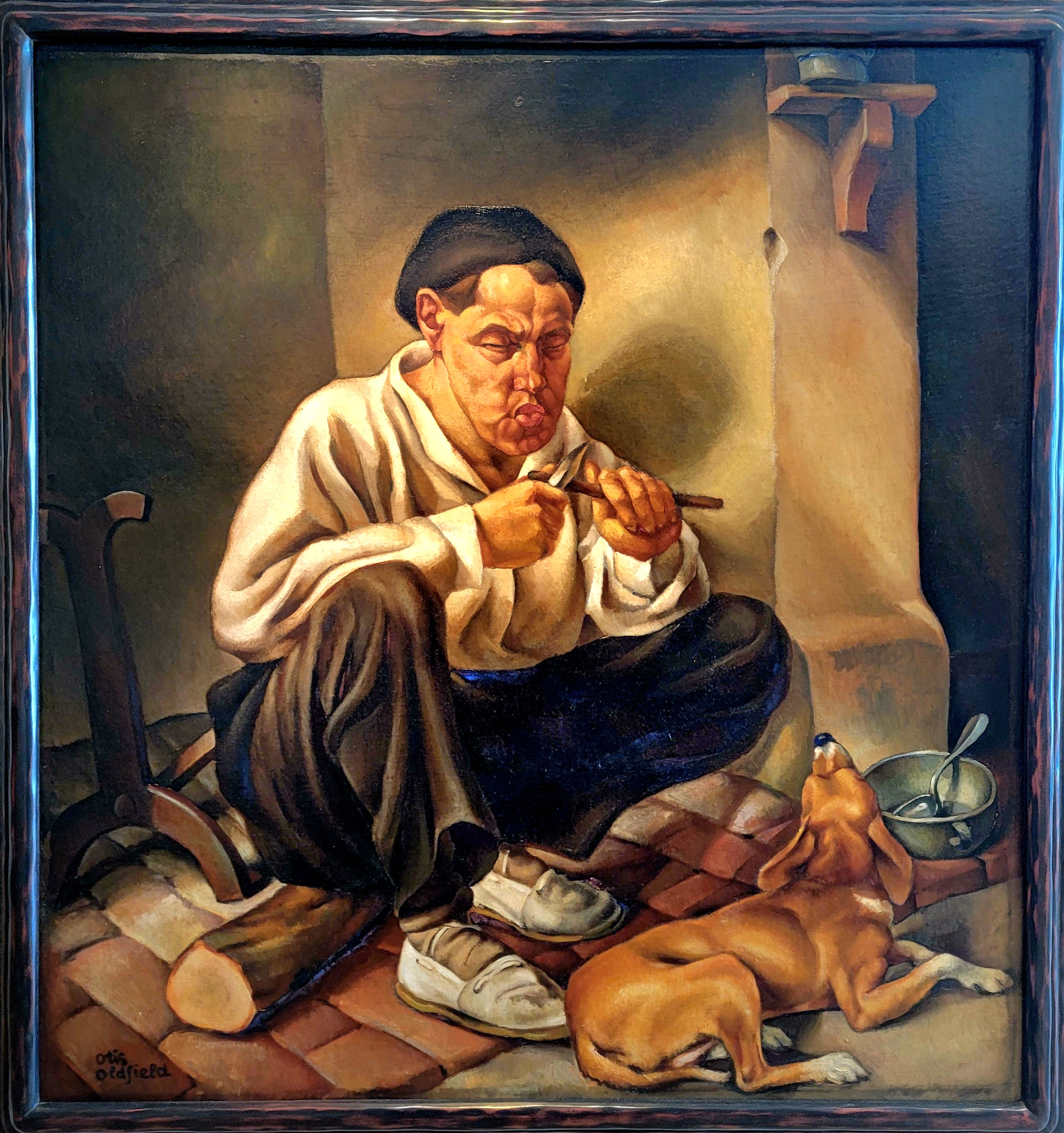
"Man with Dog", 1923 self-portrait by Otis Oldfield

Otis William Oldfield (July 3, 1890 – May 18, 1969) was a San Francisco painter, printmaker and art educator.

== Early life and education ==
Otis William Oldfield was born on July 3, 1890, in Sacramento, California. He attended Sutter High School but at age 16 he dropped out of school in order to work.

In 1908, he attended Best’s Art School in San Francisco, operated by Alice Leveque Best and Arthur William Best. In 1911, he moved to Paris to attend Académie Julian. He remained in France until 1924, then moved back to San Francisco.

== Career ==
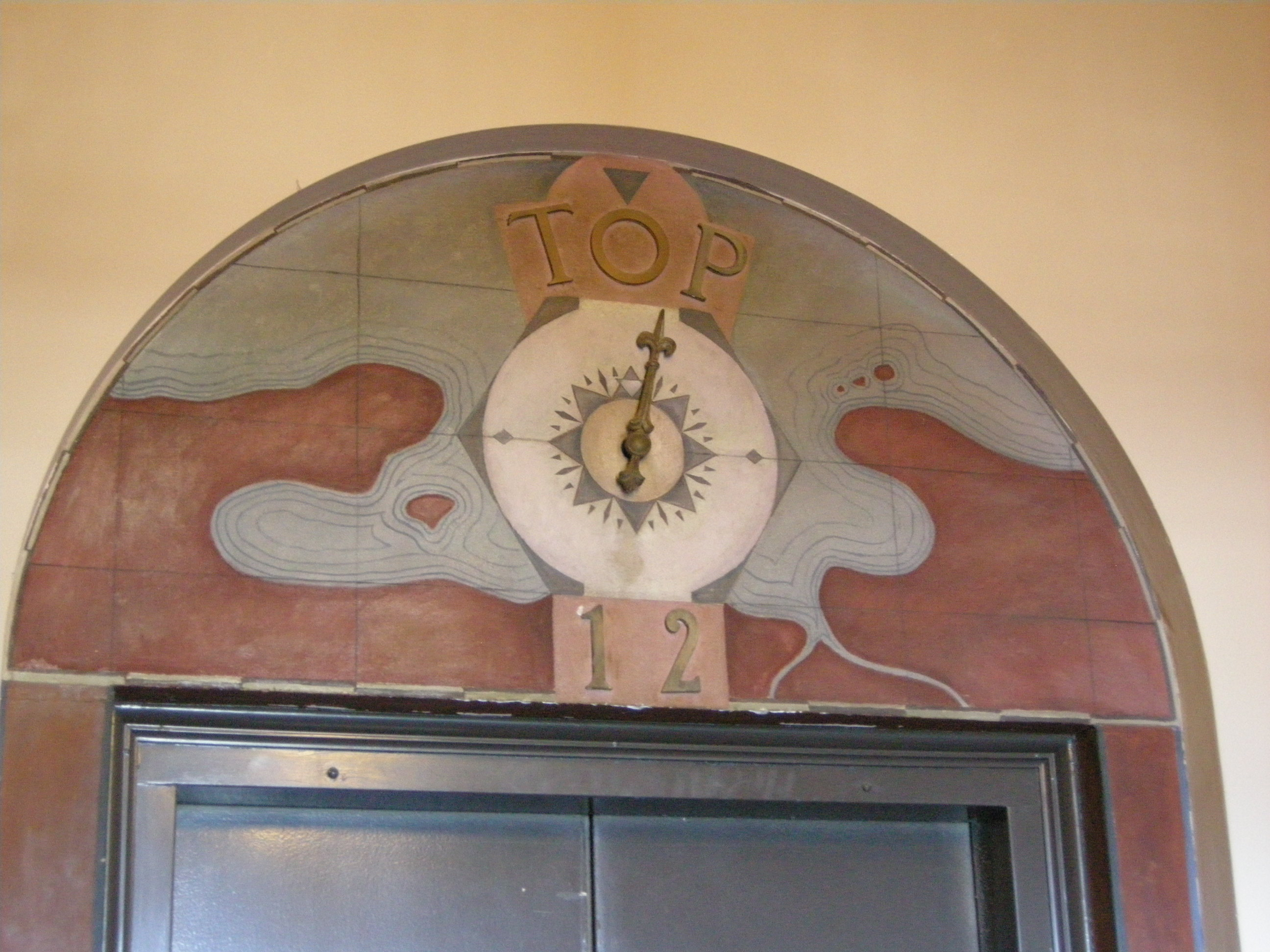
Bay Area Map (1934), one of Oldfield's frescos at Coit Tower

In 1925, Oldfield had a successful solo show at San Francisco’s Galerie Beaux Arts, an exhibit of work made while he was living in France. In 1929, Oldfield had two exhibitions of San Francisco water scenes at Montross Gallery in New York City.

The following year in 1930, Oldfield worked with architect Timothy Pflueger to create painted windows for the bar at the Pacific Coast Stock Exchange. In 1934, he was one of 26 artists selected to paint murals in the newly erected Coit Tower. One of his frescos there is titled Shipping Activities Inside the Golden Gate.

=== Teaching ===
Starting in 1925, he taught at California School of Fine Art (now San Francisco Art Institute) painting and drawing courses. From 1946 until 1952 he taught at the California College of Arts and Crafts (now called California College of the Arts, or CCA).

Oldfield's students included Yun Gee, Richard Diebenkorn, and Nathan Oliveira. In addition to teaching Yun Gee, Otis Oldfield and Yun Gee were also good friends.

== Death and legacy ==
Oldfield died on May 18, 1969, in San Francisco, California. He was survived by his wife Helen Clark Oldfield, who continued to paint until her death in 1981.

His work is in public museum collections include at Fine Arts Museums of San Francisco, Los Angeles County Museum of Art, Crocker Art Museum, National Gallery of Art, Smithsonian American Art Museum, Metropolitan Museum of Art,
