= KUNST Magazin =

German art magazine

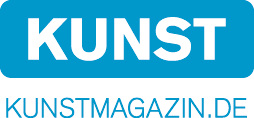
- editor: Jennifer Becker
- Categories: Fine arts
- Frequency: Monthly (double issue for Jul./Aug. and Dec./Jan.)
- Publisher: KUNST Verlag
- Founded: 2006
- Final issue: December 2013
- Country: Germany, Switzerland, Austria
- Based in: Berlin
- Language: German, English
- Website: www.kunstgalerie.de
- ISSN: 1862-7382

KUNST Magazin was a nationwide German magazine about ongoing art issues and current exhibitions. It was in circulation between 2006 and 2013.

== Appearance, production and distribution ==
KUNST Magazin was published ten times a year (with double issues in Jul./Aug. and Dec./Jan.). It was bilingual, German/English, and had a monthly print run of 40,000 copies.

It was published in Germany, German-speaking Switzerland and Austria. During the first four years of publication, KUNST Magazin Berlin applied almost solely to Berlin, and distribution was also primarily in Berlin. From January 2010 the magazine was named KUNST Magazin.

Until February 2007, KUNST Magazin appeared in DIN A6 format; from the March 2007 issue, the magazine was published in DIN A5 format.

The magazine was self-distributed in hotels, galleries, museums and academies. Art experts and collectors, as well as persons in culture, the media and politics, with an affinity for art, receive KUNST Magazin by mail.

== History ==
KUNST Magazin was founded in Berlin in April 2006 by Jennifer Becker, as KUNST Magazin Berlin. It ended publication in 2013.

== Content and issues ==
About 50 percent of KUNST Magazin consisted of editorial contributions, such as articles, interviews with artists and collectors, book reviews, and a page for children. The remainder listed current exhibitions.

From 2007 each edition focussed on one main topic. There were, for example, taboo (03/08), dignity (02/09) and vision (02/10). From February 2010 each edition also featured one gallery. Towards the end detailed exhibition tips could be found.

The print edition was supplemented by the bilingual homepage www.kunst-magazin.de, which had a daily calendar of current exhibitions and the entire contents of KUNST Magazin. All published editions were accessible in the site archive and almost every edition was available as a PDF-Download.

== Events ==
From January 2010 KUNST Magazin presented and organised a monthly meeting in Berlin at which art collectors made themselves available to the public for a moderated discussion and questions. Previous guests in this series were Giovanna Stefanel-Stoffel and Maximilian Stoffel (January 2010), Thomas Rusche (February 2010), Ivo Wessel (March 2010), Thomas Olbricht (April 2010, Stefan Balzer (May 2010), Tommi Brem (June 2010) and Christiane zu Salm (July 2010). These conversations with collectors were moderated by Jan Kage.
