= Yun Gee =

Chinese American artist

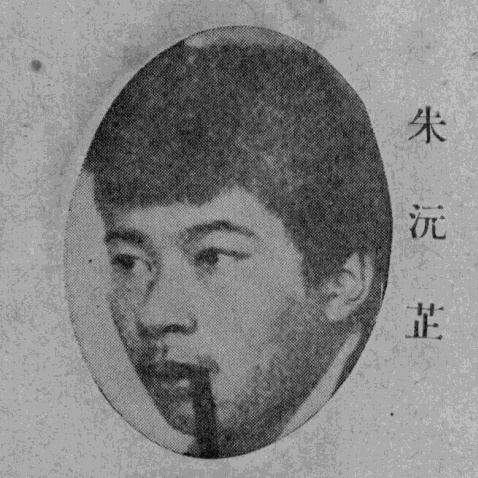
- Born: February 22, 1906; Kaiping, China
- Died: June 5, 1963 (aged 57); New York City, United States
- Other name: Gee Wing Yun
- Citizenship: American
- Education: San Francisco Art Institute
- Occupation: Artist
- Spouse(s): Paule de Reuss (m. 1930–1932); Helen Wimmer (m. 1942–1947)
- Website: https://yungee.com/

Yun Gee (Chinese: 朱远芷; pinyin: Zhū Yuánzhǐ; 1906–1963) was a Chinese American modernist artist of the School of Paris. He lived and painted in San Francisco, Paris, and New York City, and was considered one of the most daring avant-garde painters during his time.

== Biography ==
Gee was born in 1906 to Gee Quong On (Chinese: 朱廣安) and Wong Ji Li (also Wong See) as the third of four children in Kaiping, being raised in Yanglu Town, Changsha Subdistrict. His father was a merchant who lived in San Francisco and, when Gee turned 15 in 1921, Gee crossed the seas aboard SS Taiyo Maru to join his father while his mother remained in China. Because the United States' Asian Exclusion Act prohibited legal immigration by Chinese women, once Gee was in San Francisco he never saw his mother again.

Gee was able to obtain US citizenship and later enrolled at the California School of Fine Arts (present day San Francisco Art Institute). He studied painting and drawing with Otis Oldfield, who became his life-long friend. While in San Francisco, Gee lived in Chinatown and became friends with several avant-garde artists like Kenneth Rexroth, Jehanne Bietry-Salinger, John Ferren, Dorr Bothwell, and Ruth Cravath. With this group of artists, Gee and Oldfield established the Modern Gallery on Montgomery Street in 1926. In 1926, Gee also founded the Chinese Revolutionary Artists' Club, where he taught classes in advanced painting techniques and theory. Its initial members were all young Chinese immigrant men, and it had a small studio in Chinatown (at 150 Wetmore Place), which provided much of their subjects. As summarized by Oldfield, the club focused on "doing [modernist oil] work that is essentially Chinese." Art historian Anthony W. Lee, examining Gee's position in the political spectrum at the time between the Chinese Communist Party and the nationalist Kuomintang, wrote that Gee, despite being close to the Kuomintang, probably saw "the club a potential ally of the CP and thought optimistically of a nationalist regime that would incorporate theories and organizational skills from the Soviet Union," although he "was not a doctrinaire Marxist and never joined the CP". The club dissolved sometime in the 1930s.

=== Paris ===
In 1927, Gee moved to Paris under the patronage of Prince and Princess Achille Murat. He quickly befriended prominent artists of the Parisian avant-garde and exhibited his work alongside them at the Salon des Indépendants. While in Paris he also met Princess Paule de Reuss, whom he married in 1930. However, the marriage was challenging for the Princess, as she was disowned by her family and friends. In the same year of their marriage, Gee left Paris for New York and the couple eventually divorced in 1932. In Paris he was considered part of a mostly immigrant group of artists called the school of Paris.

=== New York ===
Gee's artwork was celebrated in New York but despite being included in exhibitions at the Brooklyn Museum and the Museum of Modern Art, Gee struggled during the Depression and experienced strong racial discrimination. Though he was heavily involved with the Chinese community, Gee found New York unbearable and returned to Paris in 1936. During this period, his work received critical acclaim. He was exhibited widely, most notably at the Galerie Lion d’Or in Lausanne and Galerie à la Reine Margot.

During World War II, Gee returned to New York in 1939. Three years later, he married Helen Wimmer, who had left New Jersey when she was sixteen to live with him. They had one daughter, Li-Lan, in 1943. According to Wimmer's memoirs, during this period Gee was employed at a defense-industry company, worked six days per week, and returned home to paint at night.

The couple divorced in 1947 and Wimmer eventually went on to be a gallery owner, photography curator, lecturer and writer. Gee succumbed to alcoholism. In 1950, he met Velma Aydelott, who was his companion until he died from stomach cancer in 1963.

== Art Work ==
While studying in San Francisco, Oldfield's Cézanne-inspired paintings influenced Gee's artistic style, as did Gottardo Piazzoni. As a result, from the onset of his artistic career Gee's work explored the tension and contrast between warm and cool colors. Additionally, Gee was also influenced by Eastern and Western poetry, and frequently wrote original compositions to accompany his paintings. Critics note how his poems combine Chinese style word-play and Taoist themes with the western avant-garde poetic themes of his time, such as the work of Gertrude Stein. Additionally, Gee's separation from his mother was also a reoccurring theme in his artwork.

Critics believe that Gee's subsequent interest in "Diamondism" occurred when he found the Chinese Revolutionary Artists' Club in 1926. Diamondism is a set of art principles that bring together the spiritual, intellectual, and practical aspects of painting. Developed by Gee, Diamondism reflects his interest in perception and the (im)possibility of absolute truth.

During his time in New York, however, Gee's work turned towards the political. He became an active fundraiser for causes in China, where one of his most notable efforts was the completion of a large mural on K Street as a contribution for the Chinese Flood Relief campaign. His artwork during this period synthesized his previous aesthetics with cubist and realist influences. After his divorce from Wimmer, Gee's artwork turned towards an abstract expressionist style that combined both Parisian and Asian influences.

In addition to his artwork, Gee was also a musician and played several traditional Chinese instruments. He was also interested in theater and dance. He was heavily involved in the writing and stage design for "Kuan Chung's Generosity", a WPA Theatre project in 1930 and danced at the Institute of Chinese Studies.

His work was shown in 2011 at the Tina Keng Gallery, Taipei in Taiwan. The exhibit was titled "Yun Gee: The Art of Place".

== Exhibitions ==
The following list was compiled by the Tina Keng Gallery.

Solo Exhibitions
2011	Yun Gee: The Art of Place, Tina Keng Gallery, Taipei, Taiwan
2005	Yun Gee: A Modernist Painter, Marlborough Gallery, New York, NY, USA
2004-2003	The Art of Yun Gee, Pasadena Museum of California Art, Pasadena, USA
2002	Chambers Fine Art, New York, USA
	Lin & Keng Gallery, Taipei, Taiwan
1998	Yun Gee, Lin & Keng Gallery, Taipei, Taiwan
1995	Yun Gee: San Francisco, Paris, New York, Lin & Keng Gallery, Taipei, Taiwan
1992	The Art of Yun Gee, Taipei Fine Arts Museum, Taipei, Taiwan
1991	Jan Holloway Gallery, San Francisco, USA
1983	Vanderwoude Tananbaum Gallery, New York, USA
1980-1979	The Paintings of Yun Gee, The William Benton Museum of Art, The University of Connecticut, Storrs, CT; Weatherspoon Art Gallery, The University of North Carolina, Greensboro, NC; The Oakland Museum, Oakland, CA; Bowdoin College Museum of Art, Brunswick, ME
1968	Robert Schoelkopf Gallery, New York, USA
1963-1962	Gudenzi Galleria, New York, USA
1948	The Jersey City Museum, Jersey City, NJ, USA
1947	China Institute in America, New York, USA
1946	Officers Club, Fort Hamilton, NY, USA
	Lucien Labaudt Gallery, San Francisco, USA
1945	Lilienfeld Gallery, New York, USA
1943	Milch Galleries, New York, USA
1942	Milch Galleries, New York, USA
1940	Temple's Exhibition Galleries, New York, USA
	Mural “The Spirit of Chinese Resistance” shown at Young China Club, New York, USA
	Montross Gallery, New York, USA
1937	Galerie à la Reine Margot, Paris, France
1936	Galerie à la Reine Margot, Paris, France
1934	Exhibition of Yun Gee paintings, conjoined with Yun Gee: First Dance Recital, at The National Musical Benefit Society, New York, USA
1933	The San Francisco Art Center, San Francisco, USA
	Painting “Last Supper” shown at St. Peter's Lutheran Church, Bronx, NY, USA
1932	Milch Galleries, New York, USA
	Balzac Galleries, New York, USA
1931	In Tempo Gallery, New York, USA
1929	Galerie Bernheim-Jeune, Paris, France
1928	Galerie des Artiste et Artisan, Paris, France
1927	Galerie Carmime, Paris, France
1926	The Modern Gallery, San Francisco, USA
Selected Two Person Exhibitions
2008	Experiences of Passage: The Paintings of Yun Gee and Li-lan, Lin & Keng Galler, Beijing, China
	Experiences of Passage: ThePaintings of Yun Gee and Li-lan, Jason McCoy, New York, NY, USA
2004	Sanyu & Yun Gee 1926–1960, Lin & Keng Gallery, Taipei, Taiwan
1993	The Art Works of Sanyu and Yun Gee, Lin & Keng Gallery, Taipei, Taiwan
1988	Yun Gee and Li-lan: Paintings by a Father and Daughter, Southampton Campus Fine Arts Gallery, Long Island University, Southampton, NY, USA
Selected Group Exhibitions
2025	City of Others: Asian Artists in Paris 1920s - 1940s
2013	Art Basel in Hong Kong 2013, Hong Kong Convention and Exhibition Center (HKCEC), Hong Kong
2011	Artistes chinois à Paris, musée Cernuschi, Paris, France
2009	The Third Mind: American Artists Contemplate Asia, 1860–1989, Guggenheim Museum, New York, NY, USA
	R/evolution, Tina Keng Gallery, Taipei, Taiwan
2008	Asian/American/Modern Art Shifting Currents, 1900–1970, de Young Museum, San Francisco, USA
	Madonna meets Mao: Selected Works from the Yageo Foundation Collection, Staatliche Kunstsammlungen Dresden, Dresden, Germany
2007	Lin & Keng Gallery, Taipei, Taiwan
	Art In America: 300 Years of Innovation, Guggenheim Museum, NY, USA; National Art Museum of China, Beijing, China; Shanghai Museum of Contemporary Art, Shanghai, China; Inaugural Exhibition, Lin & Keng Gallery, Beijing, China
	Cubism In Asia, The Japan Foundation, Japanese cultural House in Paris (French: Maison de la culture du Japon à Paris), Paris, France
2006	The International Asian Art Fair, Marlborough Gallery, New York, USA
	The Seventh Regiment Armory, Marlborough Gallery, New York, USA
	China International Gallery Exposition, Marlborough Gallery, Beijing, China
	Art Basel 37, Marlborough Gallery, Miami Beach, Fla., USA
2005	China International Gallery Exposition, Lin & Keng Gallery, Beijing, China
	The Seventh Regiment Armory, Marlborough Gallery, New York, USA
	Landscape – Cityscape, Marlborough Gallery, New York, USA
	Art Singapore, The Contemporary Asian Art Fair, Lin & Keng Gallery, Singapore
	Summer Dream, Lin & Keng Gallery, Taipei, Taiwan
	Works on Paper, Marlborough Gallery, New York, USA
	Chinese Masters II, Lin & Keng Gallery, Taipei, Taiwan
2004	The Not-So Still Life: A Century of California Painting and Sculpture, Pasadena Museum of California Art, Pasadena, USA
	Art Singapore, The Contemporary Asian Art Fair, Lin & Keng Gallery, Singapore
	China International Gallery Exposition, Lin & Keng Gallery, Beijing, China
2004-2003	The Not-So Still Life: A Century of California Painting and Sculpture, San Jose Museum of Art, San Jose, USA
2003	Themes on Women, Lin & Keng Gallery, Taipei, Taiwan
2003-2002	From Emperors to Hoi Polloi: Portraits of An Era, 1851–1945, The Wolfsonian Museum, Florida International University, Miami Beach, USA
2002	On-Ramps: Transitional Moments In California Art, Pasadena Museum of California Art, Pasadena, USA
2001-2000	The Pacific Makes Us Neighbors, Residence: U.S. Ambassador to Beijing, Art in Embassies Program, Beijing, China
	On Gold Mountain: A Chinese American Experience, Autry Museum of Western Heritage, Los Angeles, USA
	Made in California: Art, Image, and Identity, 1900–2000, Los Angeles County Museum of Art, Los Angeles, USA
2000	Works on Paper 1929–1949, Lin & Keng Gallery, Taipei, Taiwan
1998	Changing Perspectives on Modernism, University of Oregon Museum of Art, Eugene, OR, USA
1995	Facing Eden: 100 Years of Landscape Art in the Bay Area, M.H. de Young Memorial Museum, San Francisco, USA
	With New Eyes: Toward an Asian American Art History in the West, San Francisco State University, San Francisco, USA
1994	Four Senior Painters in Early Spring, Lung Men Art Gallery, Taipei, Taiwan
1977	Selections from the Lawrence H. Bloedel Bequest and Related Works from the Permanent Collection, Whitney Museum of American Art, New York, USA
	The Great East River Bridge, The Brooklyn Museum of Art, Brooklyn, USA
	Empire City and the Age of Urbanism (1875-45), Grand Central Galleries, New York, USA
1975	Art on Paper, Weatherspoon Art Museum, Greensboro, NC, USA
1974	Inaugural Exhibition, Hirshhorn Museum and Sculpture Garden, Washington, DC, USA
1944	Portrait of America, Metropolitan Museum of Art, New York, USA
	Opening Exhibition “Inter-Racial Art”, International Print Society, New York, USA
1942	The 8th Annual Group Exhibition by American Artists, Montross Gallery, New York, USA
1941	Art for China, Ritz Tower, New York, USA
	Paintings by Fifty Oncoming Americans, Boston Institute of Modern Art, Boston, MA, USA
	Work by Twenty-Five Artists, Montross Gallery, New York, USA
1939	6e Salon “Salon d’Éte: Peintures, Sculptures, Dessins, Aquarelles, Gouaches, Céramique”, Galerie Carmine, Paris, France
1938	Salon d’Automne, Paris, France
	Fleurs et Paysages, Galerie Carmine, Paris, France
	L'Exposition du Prix Paul-Guillaume, Galerie Berheim-Jeune, Paris, France
	4e Salon de la Piste à l’Ecran, Galerie Carmine, Paris, France
	La Xve Exposition du Salon des Tuileries, Paris, France
	Exposition: Aquarelles, Gouches, Dessins, Galerie Contemporaine, Paris, France
	Exposition: Rentrée de Vacances 38, Galerie Carmine, Paris, France
	5e Salon “Etrennes 38: Peintures, Sculptures, Dessins, Aquarelles, Gouaches, Céramique”, Galerie Carmine, Paris, France
	Salon des Indépendants, Paris, France
1937	Salon d’Automne, Paris, France
	Peinture Nouvelle, Galerie Le Niveau, Paris, France
	L’Enfant dans la Peinture Moderne, Galerie Le Niveau, Paris, France
	4e Exposition “Octobre 37”, Galerie Carmine, Paris, France
1936	Annual Exhibition of the Society of Independent Artists, New York, NY, USA
1935	Annual Exhibition of the Society of Independent Artists, New York, NY, USA
1934	Annual Exhibition of the Society of Independent Artists, New York, NY, USA
1933	Annual Exhibition of the Society of Independent Artists, New York, NY, USA
1932	Murals by American Painters and Photographers, Museum of Modern Art, New York, USA
	The Social Viewpoint in Art, John Reed Club, New York, USA
	Annual Exhibition of the Society of Independent Artists, New York, NY, USA
1931	Annual Exhibition of the Society of Independent Artists, New York, NY, USA
	Paintings, Sculpture, and Drawings by American and Foreign Artists, Brooklyn Museum of Art, Brooklyn, USA
1930	Salon des Indépendants, Paris, France
1929	Salon des Indépendants, Paris, France
1928	Salon des Indépendants, Paris, France
