= Harold Feinstein =

American photographer

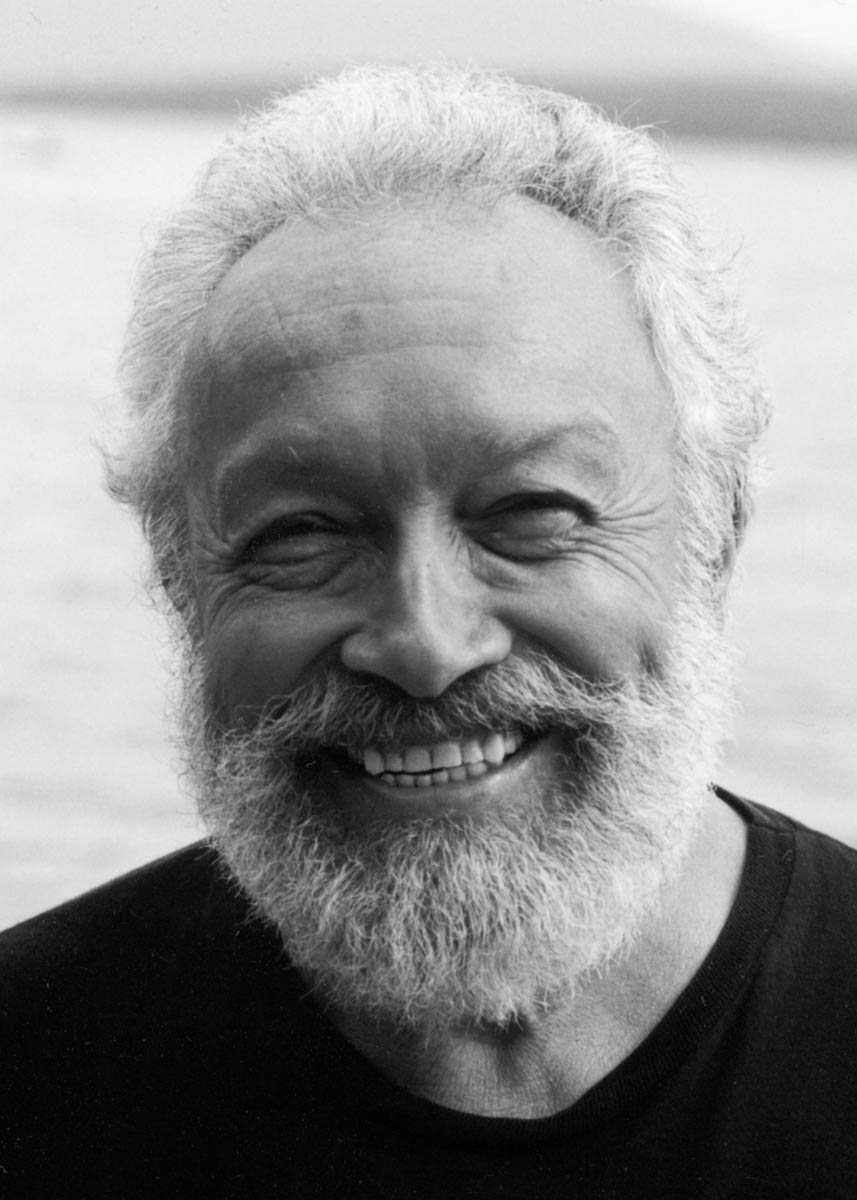
- Feinstein in 2001
- Born: April 17, 1931; Coney Island, Brooklyn, New York
- Died: June 20, 2015 (aged 84); Merrimac, Massachusetts, U.S.
- Known for: Photography
- Movement: New York school of photography
- Website: haroldfeinstein.com

Harold Martin Feinstein (April 17, 1931 – June 20, 2015) was an American photographer.

== Early life ==
Feinstein was born in Coney Island, New York, in 1931. He was the youngest of five children born to Jewish immigrant parents. His mother Sophie Reich immigrated to the United States from Austria and his father Louis immigrated from Russia. He began to practice photography in 1946 at the age of 15, borrowing a Rolleiflex camera from a neighbor.

== Early career ==
Feinstein joined the Photo League in 1948 at the age of 18. By 19 he had his work purchased by Edward Steichen for the permanent collection of the Museum of Modern Art.

Feinstein had his first exhibitions at the Whitney Museum of American Art in 1954 and at the Museum of Modern Art in 1957. He later held solo exhibitions at the George Eastman Museum (1957) and Helen Gee's Limelight Gallery (1958). His photographs were published on the inaugural cover of the literary magazine Evergreen Review and in the leftist journal Liberation.

Critics of the period referred to Feinstein as a master of his art, and his work was influential in the development of the New York school of photography.

== Coney Island ==
While Feinstein photographed the streets of New York City and elsewhere throughout his career, his favorite subject was his birthplace, Coney Island. He returned many times throughout his life to photograph the boardwalk, the amusements and the diverse visitors to the beach destination. There he was able to find and photograph a broad range of the human experience, from love to lust, joy to despair, comedy to drama. He described it as a photographer's paradise.

The International Center of Photography held an exhibition of Feinstein's Coney Island work, A Coney Island of the Heart, in 1990 and the Leica Gallery did so in 2015.

== Teaching ==
Throughout his career, Feinstein taught photography through private workshops held in his studio, as well as at numerous institutions. Many of Feinstein's students went on to become fine art photographers of note; these included Mary Ellen Mark, Ken Heyman, Mariette Pathy Allen, Wendy Watriss, and Peter Angelo Simon.

Additionally, Feinstein taught at the Annenberg School for Communication at the University of Pennsylvania, Philadelphia Museum School of Art, School of Visual Arts, the University of Massachusetts Amherst, Maryland Institute College of Art, Windham College, and College of the Holy Cross

== Later career and commercial success ==
After decades of working primarily in humanistic 35 mm film photography, Feinstein started in 2001 to create work digitally, using a scanner to photograph images of flowers, seashells, butterflies, foliage and botanicals. Cataloguing his life's work, he found that the precision of digital controls, as well as the ability to duplicate images freely and receive instantaneous feedback, enabled him to be more improvisational and take more creative risks in his work.

This work garnered Feinstein critical and commercial success. Feinstein published seven books of scanography, and his scanographic work was published several times in O, The Oprah Magazine. Feinstein's image of a white rose became a best-selling item at the retailer IKEA.

Feinstein was honored with the Computerworld Smithsonian Award in 2000 for his breakthrough in digital imaging.

== Collections ==
Feistein's work is held in the following permanent collections:

- International Center of Photography: 92 prints (as of March 2017).
- New York Public Library: 11 prints (as of March 2017).
- Museum of Modern Art, New York.

== Awards ==
- Focus award, Griffin Museum of Photography, 2011.

== Publications ==
- One Hundred Flowers. Boston: Little, Brown, 2000. ISBN 9780821226650.
- Foliage. Boston: Little, Brown, 2001. ISBN 9780821227398.
- The Infinite Rose. Boston: Bulfinch, 2004. ISBN 9780821228753.
- The Infinite Tulip. Boston: Bulfinch, 2004. ISBN 9780821228746
- One Hundred Seashells. New York: Bulfinch, 2005. ISBN 9780821262061.
- Orchidelirium. New York: Bulfinch, 2006. ISBN 9780821262054.
- One Hundred Butterflies. New York: Little, Brown, 2009. ISBN 9780316033633.
- Harold Feinstein: A Retrospective. Portland, OR: Nazraeli, 2012. ISBN 9781590053690.
- Saying Yes. Portland, OR: Blue Sky Gallery, 2016. A print on demand publication of work shown at Blue Sky Gallery, Portland, OR.
- Boardwalks, Beaches and Boulevards. Ethos.ink, 2020. On newsprint.
