= May Mirin =

American Photographer

May Mirin (1900-1997) was an American photographer who documented life in Mexico.

== Biography ==
May Mirin was born in New York in 1900. She first visited Mexico in 1937, then returned to the country frequently for long periods until the 1980s. There she produced documentary and travel series, contemporaneously with fellow Americans Jasper Wood, Wayne Miller and Canadian Reva Brooks, at a time when pictures by few significant Mexican-born photographers, other than those by Lola and Manuel Alvarez Bravo, were known outside the country.

Mirin's images and writing featured in popular mid-century American photography magazines.

== Recognition ==
In 1955, two of her photographs - one of a candlelit religious devotion in Mexico and a second of a graveyard in New York - were chosen by Edward Steichen for the exhibition The Family of Man that he curated for MoMA, and which toured the world and was seen by over 9 million visitors. She was among the numbers of its participating photographers remembered by Helen Gee as frequenting her Limelight gallery, New York City's first important post-war photography gallery (1954-1961).

== Later life ==
During the 1970s she took up painting and volunteered for the American Museum of Natural History.

== Collections ==
Examples of May Mirin's photographic work are held in the permanent collections of the Museum Folkwang in Essen, MoMA and Clerveaux Castle, Luxembourg.
