= Edward Wallowitch =

American photographer (1932–1981)

- Born: 5 May 1932; Philadelphia, Pennsylvania
- Died: 25 March 1981 (aged 48); Lake Worth, Florida
- Education: autodidact
- Known for: Photography

Edward Wallowitch (May 5, 1932 – March 25, 1981) was an American art photographer active from the 1940s to the 1970s. At age 17, he was the youngest photographer to have prints acquired by the Museum of Modern Art in New York. He was involved with pop artist Andy Warhol, with whom he also collaborated.

== Biography ==
=== Early life ===
Edward Wallowitch was born on 5 May 1932 in Philadelphia, Pennsylvania. His parents ran a delicatessen and both sides of the family descended from late nineteenth-century Lithuanian immigrants.

Wallowitch began taking photos at the age of 11, and by 1949, the Museum of Modern Art had purchased three prints for its photographic study collection. His images were included in the exhibition Photographs by 51 Photographers, August 1 to September 17, 1950 at the Museum, and others in the exhibition Christmas Photographs, November 29, 1951 to January 6, 1952.

=== Career ===
During 1953/4, Wallowitch photographed for the Philadelphia Housing Association which maintained that housing problems and poor polities were intimately related to the City's social conditions and was making a comprehensive longitudinal documentation of poor living conditions and sanitary problems. Wallowitch's contributions represent the nascence of an ongoing subject matter in his work; children, as indicated in the titles of those in the Housing Association of Delaware Valley Records held in Temple University Library, for example, 'Coleman Children: 914 W. Master Street (S.W. Temple Redevelopment Area; Now Demolished) 12 Photos. April, 1954, Girl, Vicinity Of 10th & Master Street. April, 1954, Boys, Vicinity Of 10th & Master Streets. April, 1954.

In December 1955, Wallowitch moved to Manhattan's Greenwich Village to live with his brother, Julliard-trained pianist John Wallowitch. Robert Heide describes the brothers’ rich cultural milieu:

Edward was then living in Greenwich Village with his brother John at 8 Barrow Street in a Bohemian style floor-thru basement apartment that became a kind of salon for artists, writers, musicians, actors and singers. John composed and played his own songs and became a well-known cabaret performer himself. One night, when I was invited to a makeshift potluck dinner, Eartha Kitt and Alice Ghostly performed songs with John pounding the ivories. Others who showed up at the Wallowitch salon at which Andy and myself became regulars were actors Colleen Dewhurst, George C. Scott, George Segal and a coterie of cabaret chanteuse-style singers, including Lovelady Powell, Joanne Berretta, and Jo Ann Worley, who performed at Jan Wallman’s ‘Upstairs at the Duplex’ when it was on Grove Street.

Wallowitch was among the photographers who exhibited at Helen Gee's Limelight gallery, then the only photography gallery in New York.

Wallowitch’s photographs of children and teenagers in the grimy urban landscape were chosen by Edward Steichen for the Museum of Modern Art's world-touring exhibition The Family of Man, which drew over nine million visitors in the 1950s and 1960s. Wallowitch was the youngest photographer featured in the exhibition. One image shows a young boy hiding his face inside an oversized jacket worn by an older boy—likely his brother—who looks wryly at the camera. It demonstrates Wallowitch’s skill at gaining the confidence of his young subjects; in other shots, the two boys pose with friends outside a drugstore, and in one, a starling perches on the older boy’s shoulder as he gazes at it, straw in mouth, beneath his slicked-back hair. Another photo captures a little girl in a white dress running past crumpled paper, the motion blur blending her dress and the paper into what looks like angel’s wings.

In 1956, Wallowitch's pictures of children's’ chalk drawings traced from shadows on the pavement were featured in Design magazine and in Life in 1957.

=== Relationship with Andy Warhol ===
In 1956, Wallowitch met commercial artist Andy Warhol through illustrator Nathan Gluck, who was Warhol's assistant. They formed a relationship, both artistic and personal. John Wallowitch described his brother's affair with the artist as becoming "hot and heavy" very quickly. "Overnight, it seemed to me. … One day I happened to walk through the front room, where Ed slept . . . and they were going at it like crazy people."

Wallowitch’s photographs of street urchins and young men appeared in Warhol's lushly presented A Gold Book (1957) printed on gold-coated paper with tissue in pastel hues laid between the pages. Trained in fashion illustration and graphic design, Warhol habitually used the expedient of tracing photographs projected with an epidiascope, resulting in the Wallowitch photographs undergoing a subtle transformation during Warhol's often cursory tracing of contours and hatching of shadows.

They collaborated on a commercial project as well; Warhol used Wallowitch's photograph of his sister Anna Mae Wallowitch as the inspiration for his illustration for the short story "Melissa of the 27 Dreams," which appeared in the February 1958 issue of Seventeen. Warhol also used Wallowitch's photograph Young Man Smoking a Cigarette (c.1956), for his 1958 design for a book cover he submitted to Simon & Schuster for the Walter Ross pulp novel The Immortal.

Wallowitch, whose mental health was always unstable, suffered a severe breakdown in October 1958. Lacking funds, John sought financial help from Warhol to hospitalize him, but Warhol refused: "He said his business manager told him not to. And that’s what stays with me about Andy. He didn't come through for Eddie." Following his recovery, Wallowitch and Warhol reestablished a friendship, and their working relationship continued into Warhol's early Pop art years before they drifted apart. Many of Warhol's drawings and paintings of Campbell's soup cans and dollar bills from 1961 and 1962 were based on Wallowitch's photographs.

His brother's album This Is John Wallowitch!!! (1964) featured cover art designed by Warhol.

=== Later life and death ===
In 1966, Wallowitch photographed for a book about the Appalachian Mountains titled My Appalachia by the children's author Rebecca Caudill.

Wallowitch moved to Florida, taking a studio there sometime in 1967 to ‘retire’ as he told Connie Houser, wife of artist Jim Houser. There, he concentrated on portraits of teenagers in the 1970s.

Wallowitch died at his home in Lake Worth, Florida on March 25, 1981. He was organizing a retrospective of his work that would have taken place in Palm Beach, Florida, at the time of his death. He was survived by his parents, Anna and John Wallowitch; sister, Anna Mae; and two brothers, John and Paul.

In a diary entry dated April 21, 1981, Andy Warhol recounted learning of his death:

And John Wallowitch called. I raved to him about seeing him playing the piano on cable TV, and I told him to come to the office. He was calling to tell me that his brother Eddie, my first boyfriend about twenty-five years ago — that he just went down to Florida to visit Eddie and found him bloated and dead in his house. He'd been drinking, gone off A.A. and had a fit. He always got depressed and I never knew why because he was good-looking and he was a photographer. John didn't want to look at the body, so a friend came over and identified it.

== Legacy ==
In 1995 Photographs, in memory of Edward and conceived by Lynn Lobban, performed by John Wallowitch and Lobban, and directed by Peter Schlosser, was staged at Don’t Tell Mama cabaret in New York.

== Exhibitions ==
Exhibitions at The Museum of Modern Art:

- Photographs from the Museum Collection, November 26, 1958 – January 18, 1959
- The Family of Man, January 24–May 8, 1955
- Christmas Photographs, November 29, 1951 – January 6, 1952
- Photographs by 51 Photographers, August 1–September 17, 1950
