= Western Colorado Center for the Arts =

The Art Center of Western Colorado
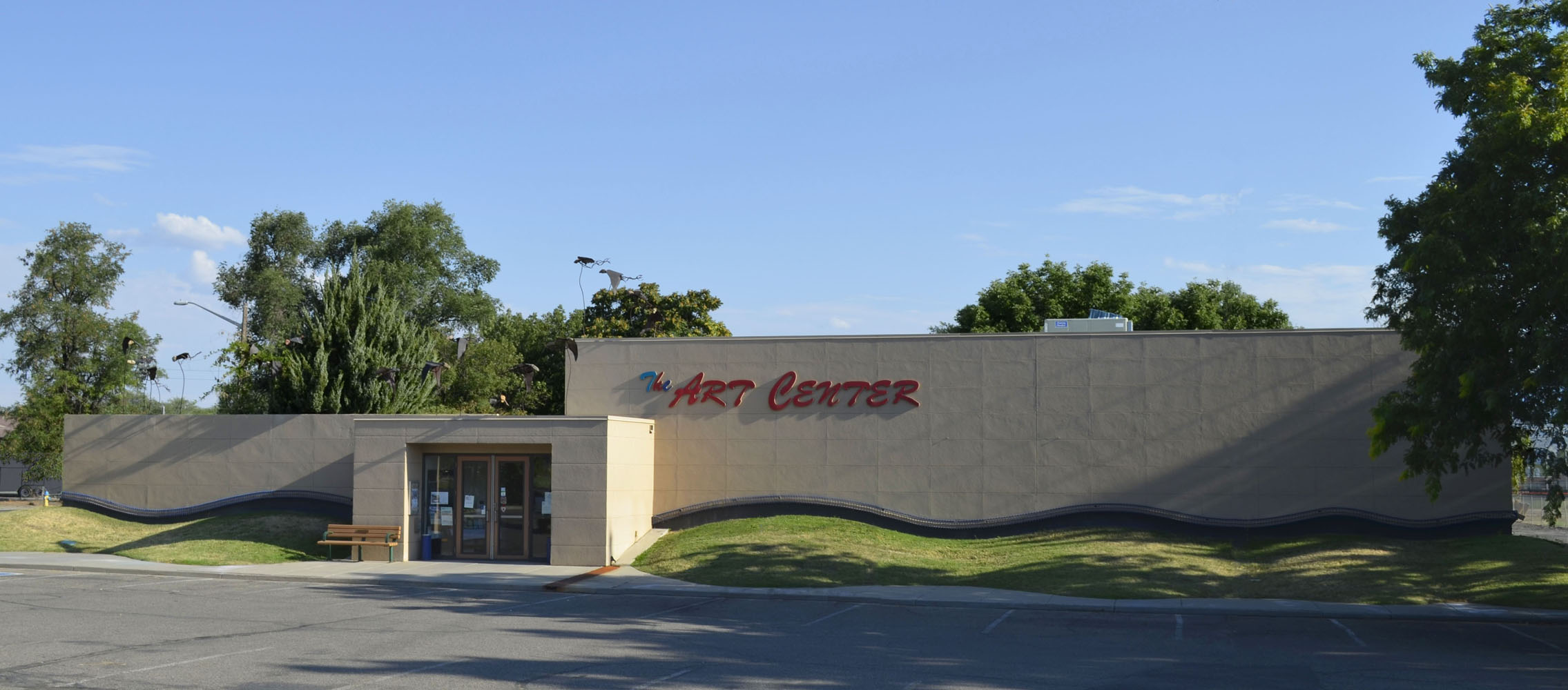
- Established: 1953
- Location: 1803 North Seventh Street; Grand Junction, Colorado
- Coordinates: 39.083850°N 108.561246°W
- Type: Arts center
- Website: http://www.gjartcenter.org

The Art Center of Western Colorado, formerly known as The Western Colorado Center for the Arts, is located at 1803 North Seventh Street in Grand Junction, Colorado. Founded in 1953, the art center has a permanent collection comprising mainly regional Western art. Its facilities also include four galleries, a gift shop, two enclosed courtyards, as well as several studios and classrooms.

== History ==
The Art Center originated from the Beaux Arts Club, a small group of people interested in painting during the 1920s. This club eventually evolved into the Fine Arts Association. In February 1953, the group incorporated themselves as the Mesa County Art Center. In 1957, the organization was granted 501(c)(3) status. Then, in January 1968, the members of the organization voted to change its name to the Western Colorado Center for the Arts.

In 1947, Fred Mantey, a local philanthropist, offered to donate one acre of land and $1,000 to establish an art center in Grand Junction. Alfred Nestler, who was an interior decorator, artist, and Mantey's son-in-law, took the initiative to promote the idea and enlisted the support of other artists to organize the effort. Mantey's donation became official in 1953.

Other people who dedicated their resources and time to the founding of the Art Center and served on its board included:

- E.L. Bacon- president of US Bank at the time
- Verona Burkhard - an artist and teacher, who designed and created the copper doors in the first building constructed to house the Art Center.

By 1940, the group had acquired and purchased six paintings for the Art Center's permanent collection. These artworks were stored at the central branch of the Mesa County Public Library and at Mesa Junior College (which later became Colorado Mesa University).

The fundraising campaign encompassed various events and activities such as artists' balls, exhibits, sidewalk art sales, musical shows and rummage sales. One of the efforts involved a petition to school children, encouraging them to purchase a brick' for the new building for 25 cents. Art clubs in the area, such as the Brush and Palette Club, Paint for Pleasure, the Wednesday Music Club, and the original Colorado chapter of the American Artists Professional League, actively supported fundraising efforts by organizing their own project.

In 1957, the board of trustees, with the approval of Mantey's widow, made the decision to sell the donated land because it was too far from the town center.

In May 1960, the organization bought and remodelled a two-story frame house at 1745 N. Seventh Street in Grand Junction. The building was meant to serve as a temporary location until an ideal structure could be built. The Mesa County Art Center facility opened its doors November 1960. The main floor of the house was used for exhibits and recitals. Painting classes were held upstairs, and ceramics classes were in the basement. The Art Center had 121 members.

By 1965, the Art Center had outgrown the original house. A professional fundraising effort kicked off in October 1967, and the Art Center took over its own campaign several months later. A new building was erected just north of the two-story house. The facility included a kitchen, classrooms, and an octagonal room with walls designed for exhibits. This room also included a stage for music and dance performances and productions of a community theater group. The Art Center moved in April, 1970. The Art Center also purchased additional land north of the new building to Orchard Avenue which now serves as the parking lot.

The Art Center hired its first director in September 1978, and programs were expanded to include more classes and some major juried shows.

In 1982, the Art Center received a $100,000 donation from the Grand Junction Lions Club. This money came with two conditions: Matching funds must be raised from the community and the Art Center must break ground on its second expansion before January 1983. The Art Center broke ground on the expansion just weeks before the deadline. This expansion turned a 7,800-square-foot facility into a 14,000-square-foot building. New features included a lobby with an art shop, two courtyards, the North Gallery, storage areas, and a ceramics studio. Storage and dressing rooms were added to the theater area during remodelling of the existing building. Both the house and the new building were owned free and clear. The Art Center planned to reopen with an exhibition from the Smithsonian Institution featuring works of 20th century artists, including Pablo Picasso.

The $750,000 expansion coincided with the collapse of the oil shale industry and downturn of Grand Junction's economy. The Arts Center's funding drive to pay for the expansion failed.

By 1985, the Art Center had 760 members. However, new membership was down, and existing members were renewing at reduced levels. Simultaneously, the operating costs of the Art Center had increased, and both investment and program revenue were down. The Art Center turned its focus to local artists and exhibits, and cut its professional organization memberships. The director resigned, saying the Art Center could no longer afford his position.

In 1986, 10 members of the Board of Trustees put their own money into sponsoring the biggest juried art show undertaken in Grand Junction to date. The show, titled ART-USA, was organized in less than four months. A sum of $10,000 would be divided among the top four artists. The unusually high cash prizes were designed to attract a large number of entries, and announcements were sent to art schools and institutions nationwide. The board of trustees anticipated thousands of entrants, followed by thousands of visitors to the 6-week exhibition. ART-USA was the first time the Art Center charged admission to an exhibit.

In 1986, the Art Center Foundation was established. This endowment is a separate, supporting entity to the Art Center.

The second ART-USA exhibit saw 1,600 entries from across the US and abroad, and allowed the Art Center to repay its debts.

In the spring of 1989, Dr. Arch Gould approached the Art Center to donate $100,000 worth of Navajo rugs to the ACF permanent collection and $100,000 to expand the Art Center facility if the community could raise $100,000 for the long-term maintenance of the collection. A collector from the eastern United States promised six additional rugs worth an estimated $75,000. The new space, dubbed the Gould Gallery, was dedicated in January 1991.

Beginning in the 1990s, the Art Center struggled once again with space restrictions, high use, and limited finances. The Art Center tried twice to negotiate a loan from the city of Grand Junction, but was unsuccessful. In 1992, an emergency membership drive was staged, and the board agreed to charge a general admission fee to the Art Center as a "last resort."

The Art Center has tried twice to relocate for the sake of space. In 1993, the Art Center abandoned plans to move into the old Main Street Mercantile building when another buyer beat it to the purchase. In 2001, the Art Center approached city parks officials with a proposal to build a new art center on a former mill-tailings site near the Colorado River, adjacent to the Grand Junction Botanical Gardens, but this relocation plan was eventually shelved in favor of addressing more immediate goals at the current center. The Art Center devoted itself to maximizing use of the current space and expanding existing programs.

=== 2000s ===
In 2009, High Noon Solar donated and installed a 9.02-KW solar electric grid tie system to the Art Center, and Blue Moon Electric donated time and energy to help wire the system. That same year, the Art Center also sponsored a used bookstore, with books donated by local artists, to raise funds for the young adult intern and scholarship programs.

Renovations totaling $80,000 have adapted the building to meet the requirements of the American With Disabilities Act.

== Permanent collection ==
The Art Center maintains over 600 works of art in its permanent collection, some of which are owned by the Art Center Foundation. The collection includes western landscape painting, Navajo rugs, and Ancestral Puebloan pottery. The two most represented artists are Alfred Nestler and Paul Pletka. A collection of Japanese art—mostly ukiyo-e prints but also drawings, bugaku masks, and woodcuts by Shiko Munakata—was bequeathed to the ACF in 2015 by Bill Robinson, the founderof Colorado Mesa University's theater department.

== Programs and partnerships ==
The Art Center offers classes, workshops and exhibits.

The Art Center offers an average of 15 regular classes each session, with five sessions per year. Additionally, the Art Center puts on 18 to 24 workshops per year.

=== Classes and workshops ===
Classes and workshop topics cover painting, photography, stained glass, sculpture, figure drawing, mixed-media collage and ceramics.

Ceramics classes and workshops rank among the most popular. Artist-in-residence Terry Shepherd has taught raku, a fast-firing process for ceramics that originated in Japan, and other ceramics techniques, to Art Center students since the 1980s.

The Altrusa Art Fair has been organized by the Altrusa International service group for 60 years now. The middle- and high-school exhibits are meant to promote fresh, young talent that might otherwise go unnoticed. Each school has the opportunity to compete for ribbons and certificates of merit.

The Artability program offers art classes to people with mental, social or physical special needs.

=== Community events ===
The Art Center can be rented for private events the first bar mitzvah in Grand Junction occurred at the Art Center.

=== Exhibits ===
The Art Center hosts an average of 26 exhibits each year, some of which are annual events while the rest are signature events. Some exhibits feature contemporary art alongside legacy work from the Art Center's permanent collection.

==== Recurring exhibits ====
Some of the longstanding recurring exhibits are listed below.

The Members Exhibit includes works produced by the Art Center's supporters. In 2013, hundreds of people attended across the Western Slope of Colorado.

The Colorado Mesa University All Campus Exhibit is a juried show for students and faculty.

When the Contemporary Exhibit began in 2006, it was the first ceramics show of its kind in Grand Junction. Paul Soldner was a guest artist, known for his clay work, and the show received attention in "Clay Times" magazine.

The Colorado Art Educators Association Juried Exhibit features the work of art teachers from Colorado and Wyoming. Any artist who teaches art at any level, from kindergarten through college, is eligible to submit art for this exhibit.

The quinquennial exhibit "The Metalworkers" first appeared in 2009, underwritten by Western Slope Auto/Toyota Superstore. This exhibit featured the varied metal art of 14 artists, half of whom were women and half of whom were men. The second exhibit in 2014 included sculptures by local artists. This featured enamelling work by late Grand Junction artist Margaret Kuntz which is now a part of the Art Center's permanent collection.

==== Exhibits and Shows ====
The Art Center has hosted art exhibitions, performances, and occasionally guest curators.

Notable past displays include:

- a Christo and Jeanne-Claude exhibition,
- prints by Mauricio Lasansky
- the first exhibition of Frank Mechau's art in 20 years

=== Partnerships ===
The Art Center has worked in partnership with Colorado Mesa University (formerly Mesa State College) and the Museum of Western Colorado to host exhibitions, lectures and workshops.

The Art Center also collaborates with local galleries.

The Art Center has partnered with other non-profits to provide art scholarships to area students, and since 2008, the local non-profit Super Rad Art Jam has brought Mesa County Valley School District 51 art students to the Art Center for a ceramics workshop."

== Facilities and Operations ==
The current 16,700-square-foot facility includes five exhibition galleries, a working studio/gallery space, 3,000 square feet of classroom studio space, a gift shop, an enclosed courtyard and sculpture garden, climate-controlled art collection storage, and administrative offices.

Although The Art Center began as a purely volunteer-staffed non-profit, it now has six paid, full-time staffers, two part-timers and a rotating group of teachers, and 300-plus volunteers.
