= Steven W. Plattner =

American art historian

Steven W. Plattner (born 1953) is an American photographic historian, author, curator, and printing manager.

== Life ==
Born in Cincinnati, he enrolled at Macalester College and majored in American studies and geography, with an emphasis on American social documentary photography. In 1975, he received a $3883 Youthgrant from the National Endowment for the Humanities (NEH) to curate a traveling exhibition of 126 photographs from the renowned Farm Security Administration (FSA) project directed by Roy E. Stryker. From 1935 to 1942, the FSA employed photographers Walker Evans, Ben Shahn, Dorothea Lange, Russell Lee, Marion Post Wolcott, Arthur Rothstein, John Vachon, John Collier, Jr. and Jack Delano to document rural America and help acquaint more affluent Americans with the severity of the Great Depression. The exhibition was shown at Macalester from March 8–28, 1976. NEH funded a second grant allowing the exhibition to travel widely throughout Minnesota, Texas, and several other states over the next four years.

Plattner was the Acting Chief Photographer for the Minnesota Historical Society in 1978, and many of his early photographs reside there. Later that year, he enrolled in the M.A. program in American Studies at George Washington University. In the process of writing his M.A. thesis on Roy Stryker's second major project—the Standard Oil Company (New Jersey) photography project—he persuaded Exxon Corporation to fund a major traveling exhibition of SONJ photographs, opening at the International Center of Photography (ICP) in New York in May, 1983. The exhibit featured works by photographers Edwin and Louise Rosskam, Sol Libsohn, Harold Corsini, Esther Bubley, Russell Lee, John Vachon, Charlotte Brooks, Todd Webb, Martha Roberts, and Gordon Parks. The exhibition—and Plattner's book of the same name—received wide publicity in the New York Times, Forbes Magazine and was the subject of an in-depth profile on Charles Kuralt's CBS Sunday Morning Program.

In 1983 Plattner went on to study Stryker's Pittsburgh Photographic Library project, which followed the Standard Oil project from 1950 to 1953. Plattner conducted oral history interviews with the project's key photographers—Clyde Hare, Harold Corsini, Esther Bubley, Russell Lee, James P. Blair, Richard Saunders, Elliott Erwitt, Sol Libsohn, and Arnold S. Eagle—and co-authored and edited Witness to the Fifties, published in 1999 with the help of a grant from the Howard Heinz Endowment.

Plattner served as the Curator of Photographs for the Cincinnati Historical Society from 1981 to 1984. He continued his studies on the Standard Oil project, and contributed two photo-essays to the Wharton Annual in 1984 (concerning the Standard Oil photographs) and 1985 (on a later Stryker-led project for Jones & Laughlin Steel Corporation). In 1985, he left the non-profit world, taking a position with a leading commercial printing company in Cincinnati, and has remained in the commercial printing field for 25 years. Over the past decade, he has become a photographer himself, and has self-published several digital photographic books. Influenced by the FSA and Standard Oil photographers, and more recently by Tom Arndt, William Christenberry, Edward Burtynsky, George Tice, and Jerome Liebling, he takes a straight and direct approach to photographing popular culture, roadside Americana, folk and outsider art environments, monuments, and landscapes.
