= James P. Blair =

American photographer (1931–2021)

- Born: April 14, 1931 Philadelphia, Pennsylvania, U.S.
- Died: April 25, 2021 (aged 90) Middlebury, Vermont, U.S.
- Occupation: Photographer

James Pease Blair (April 14, 1931 – April 25, 2021) was an American photographer. His work has been published in National Geographic magazine and elsewhere.

== Background ==
Blair was born in Philadelphia on April 14, 1931. He studied with Harry Callahan and Aaron Siskind at the Institute of Design at the Illinois Institute of Technology in Chicago. Blair died in Middlebury, Vermont on April 25, 2021, at the age of 90.

== Career ==
Following graduation, he photographed at the Pittsburgh Photographic Library for Roy E. Stryker, the director of the Farm Security Administration's photographic-documentation project of the 1930s.

Blair served for two years as a lieutenant in the U.S. Navy, spending part of that time assisting refugees from North Vietnam.

Upon his return in 1958, he joined WIIC-TV, an NBC affiliate in Pittsburgh, as a reporter and film photographer. As a freelance photographer, Blair also earned commissions from the U.S. Information Agency, Time, Life, and National Geographic magazines. He put together a solo show at the Carnegie Museum of Art in Pittsburgh and co-authored the book Listen With the Eye with poet Samuel Hazo.

Success with his National Geographic assignments brought him to the staff in 1962, where he happily spent over thirty years; by 1994 he had accumulated 46 articles and over 2,000 pictures. His coverage took him to Yugoslavia, Czechoslovakia, Ethiopia, West Africa, Iran, Greece, and across the United States. He covered agriculture, coal, astronomy, and the uses of photography in science, among other subjects. In 1983, he photographed Our Threatened Inheritance, the National Geographic Society's benchmark book on U.S. federal lands. His final article for the magazine, published in 1994, dealt with the first foreign sailing voyage down the Volga River in Russia.

In 1977, Blair received the Overseas Press Club of America Award for Best Photographic Reporting from Abroad for his 1976 coverage of South Africa. Over the years, he received numerous awards from the National Press Photographers Association and the White House News Photographers Association.

There have been solo shows of his work in Iran, St. Louis, Pittsburgh, and Washington D.C.; he has been included in group shows in Atlanta and Washington, D.C. His photographs are represented in the permanent collections of the National Portrait Gallery in Washington D.C., the Museum of Modern Art in New York City, the Portland Museum of Art in Portland, Maine, and the Carnegie Museum of Art in Pittsburgh. The 1988 centennial National Geographic exhibit Odyssey included several of his photographs.

After retiring from the National Geographic Society in 1994, Blair continued photographing and teaching. He photographed magazine assignments for National Geographic, Vermont Life, and Wooden Boat. Taunton Press published his book Wooden Fences in 1997. His photography is featured in National Geographic's best-selling book The Geography of Religion: Where God Lives, Where Pilgrims Walk, published in 2004. He was a National Fellow of the Explorers Club and from 1998 onward was a member of the Cosmos Club in Washington, D.C.
