= Kristin Capp =

American photographer, author and educator

Kristin Capp (born 1964) is an American photographer, author and educator. Capp's work has been exhibited both nationally and internationally. Her work is included in collections at the Whitney Museum in New York, the Lyman Allyn Art Museum in Connecticut, the International Center of Photography in New York and the Harvard Art Museum. She was one of sixty international artists selected for the Göteborg International Biennial for Contemporary Art in 2017. Her work has appeared in the Bursa International Photofest in Turkey, as well as in Switzerland, France, Belgium, Germany and the United States.

She has published three books of photography: Hutterite: A World of Grace (1998), Americana (2000) and Brasil (2016).

== Education ==
Kristin Capp was born in Portland, Oregon in 1964, and grew up in Seattle, Washington.

Capp studied French and Russian at McGill University, Quebec, Canada where she also enrolled in a photography class. She then lived in New York City, studying analog photography and fine art printing. In 2010, Capp received a Fulbright Fellowship to work on a project title Picturing Communities: A Photographic Documentary of Non-Profits in Rural Namibia: The Application of Digital Photography in Art, Advertising and Personal Documentary.

== Work ==
In 1994, Capp photographed a Hutterite community in eastern Washington state. Hutterites, like the Amish and Mennonites, are descended from sixteenth-century Anabaptists, and retain many traditional agrarian ways. The book that resulted from this work, Hutterite: A World of Grace, explored this community's blend of old and new and was distinguished, as one reviewer put it, by its “tender and mysterious” square black-and-white photographs of young Hutterite women that evoke “the existence of an interior complexity within their beautifully plain exteriors.”

Over a period of eight years, Capp traveled frequently to Brazil, where she shot 800 rolls of film on a Rolleiflex. As a result of this work, Brasil (2016), Capp eschewed the usual imagery of carnival and exoticized sexuality for black-and-white photographs of "street culture, landscape, architecture and the visual magic she encountered in Rio de Janeiro." To complete the project, Capp crowd-funded to cover costs of layout, design and shipping. The project foregrounds Capp's aesthetic concerns with marginalized communities and the book was published by the Italian fine-art publisher Damiani.

In 2012, while on a Fulbright, Capp created a collection of photographs titled The Horse Latitudes. The exhibit, as a journalist put it, was "Inspired by nature, light and the complexity of the cultural, social and natural landscape" of different regions of Namibia.

Capp leads the New Media Design Course at the KCAC campus of the College of the Arts (COTA) in Windhoek, Namibia.

== Permanent collections ==
Capp's work is in the permanent collections of the following museums:

- Bibliothèque nationale de France
- Brooklyn Museum of Art, New York
- Center for Creative Photography, Tucson, Arizona
- Harvard Art Museums, Massachusetts
- High Museum of Art, Atlanta, Georgia
- International Center of Photography, New York
- Kunsthaus Zürich, Switzerland
- Maison européenne de la photographie, Paris, France
- Musée de la Photographie, Charleroi, Belgium
- Museum of Fine Arts, Houston, Texas
- Museum of Fine Arts, Santa Fe, New Mexico
- Museum Ludwig, Cologne, Germany
- Norton Museum of Art, West Palm Beach, Florida
- Muscarelle Museum of Art, William & Mary, Williamsburg, Virginia
- Seattle Art Museum
- Richard M. Ross Art Museum, Delaware Ohio
- Vanderbilt University Fine Arts Gallery, Nashville, Tennessee
- Whitney Museum of American Art, New York
