= John Vachon =

American photographer (1914–1975)

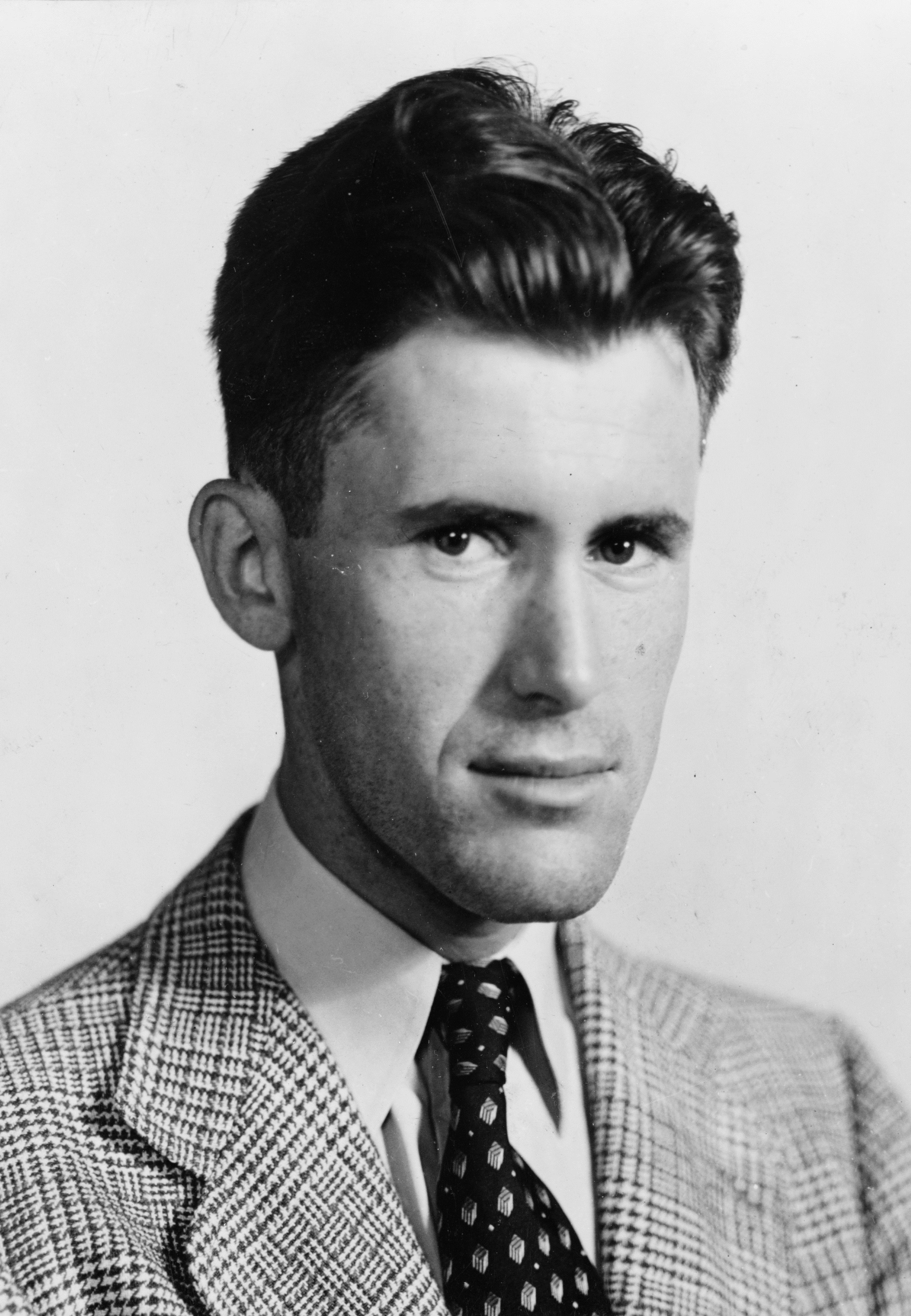
- Vachon in 1942
- Born: John Felix Vachon; May 19, 1914; Saint Paul, Minnesota, U.S.
- Died: April 20, 1975 (aged 60); New York City, New York, U.S.
- Known for: Photography

John Felix Vachon (May 19, 1914 – April 20, 1975) was an American photographer. Vachon is remembered most for his photography working for the Farm Security Administration (FSA) as part of the New Deal and for contributions to Look magazine.

== Biography ==
John Vachon was born on May 19, 1914, to a middle-class Irish Catholic Family in Saint Paul, Minnesota. He was the son of Ann Marie (O'Hara) and Harry Parnell Vachon. His parents were not well off, his father made a get-by living as a traveling salesman in stationery supplies. He had one younger brother named Robert. Vachon had a Catholic education and graduated from Cretin High School. He continued his education at the University of St. Thomas in Saint Paul and received a bachelor's degree in 1934.

Vachon moved to Washington, D.C., after receiving a fellowship to attend graduate school at Catholic University of America to study English literature and become a writer. As he began his studies, a few months later, he was forced to leave school due to his drinking. After his leave from graduate school, Vachon looked for work around Washington, D.C., finding his first job in photography working for the Farm Security Administration's Historic Division as one of the photographers hired by Roy Stryker to document the plight of migrants during the Great Depression.

In about 1938 Vachon married Millicent Leeper who was known as Penny. While Vachon was on the road working as a photographer for the FSA, he wrote daily letters to Penny, as well as to his mother. He wrote them to describe his experiences, ambitions, self-doubt, sense of humor, obligation to the FSA, the people he met, the news he read about, and the movies he watched. In the letters, Vachon describes how he relied on Penny to support him and his work. They had three children. Penny committed suicide in 1960. Vachon married Marie Francoise Fourestier in 1961. They had two more children. Vachon served in the United States Army in 1945. Vachon's daughter, Christine Vachon, became an independent film producer in adulthood. His son Michael became an editor, and worked with his father in his later years.

== Career ==
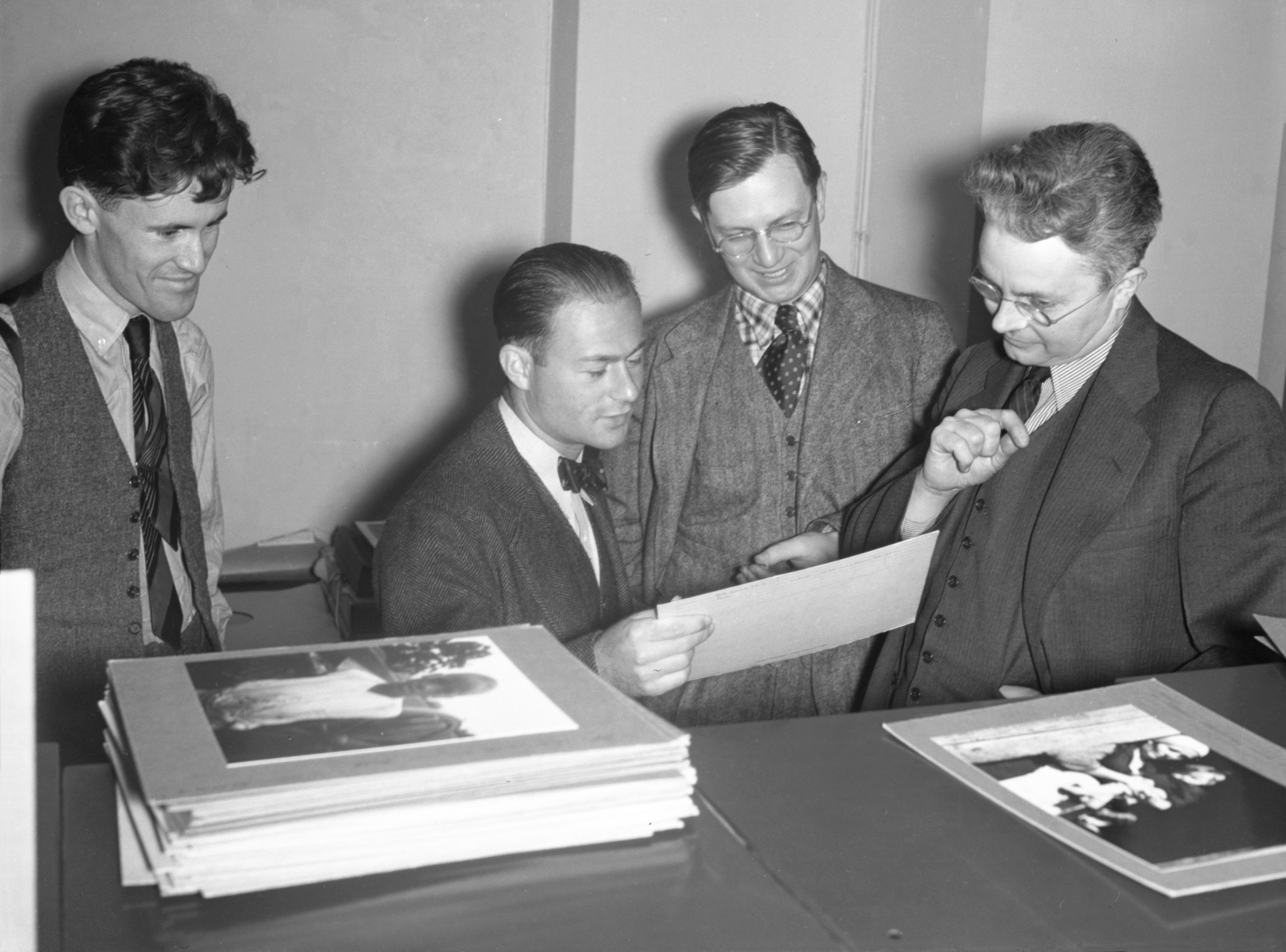
Farm Security Administration photographers (from left) John Vachon, Arthur Rothstein and Russell Lee with Roy Stryker

=== Farm Security Administration ===
The FSA was a New Deal agency created in 1937 to combat rural poverty during the Great Depression in the United States. The FSA is famous for its small but highly influential photography program which began in 1935 under its prior name and mission as the Resettlement Administration. The photo program ran until 1944, documenting the challenges of rural poverty and farm life. John Vachon's first job at the FSA carried the title "assistant messenger." He was twenty-one, and had come to Washington, D.C., from his native Minnesota to attend the Catholic University of America.

Vachon had no intention of becoming a photographer when he took the position in 1936, but as his responsibilities increased for maintaining the FSA photographic file, his interest in photography grew. The FSA sent more than forty photographers into the field and collected images of American life that would result in an archive of 165,000 FSA prints. Some FSA employees had well-established careers, while others become famous as photographers as a result of their work, including Esther Bubley, Marjory Collins, Marion Post Wolcott, Jack Delano, Arthur Rothstein, Walker Evans, Russell Lee, Gordon Parks, Carl Mydans, Dorothea Lange and Ben Shahn.

By 1937 Vachon started to take photographs himself, and with advice from Ben Shahn, he tried out a Leica camera in and around Washington. His weekend photographs of "everything in the Potomac River valley" were clearly the work of a beginner, but Stryker lent him equipment and encouraged him to keep at it. Arthur Rothstein, who took him along on a photographic assignment to the mountains of Virginia. In October and November 1938, Vachon traveled to Nebraska on his first extensive solo trip. He photographed agricultural programs on behalf of the FSA's regional office and pursued an extra assignment in Omaha. Vachon worked extensively in the midwestern and Great Plains states.

=== Other notable employment ===
As the Great Depression lessened and American involvement in the War in Europe increased, the government moved FSA photography project to the Office of War Information, and Vachon's job transferred to that agency as well, where he worked from 1942 to 1943. He later worked as a staff photographer for Standard Oil Company of New Jersey between 1943 and 1944. After serving in the army in 1944–45, in 1947 Vachon joined the Photo League, where he wrote book reviews for Photo Notes and participated in many exhibitions. Between 1945 and 1947 he photographed New Jersey and Venezuela for Standard, and Poland for the United Nations Relief and Rehabilitation Administration.

Vachon became a staff photographer for Life magazine, where he worked between 1947 and 1949, and for over twenty five years beginning in 1947 at Look magazine. In 1953 Vachon took the first pictures of Marilyn Monroe and Joe DiMaggio when Monroe cured a sprained ankle near Banff, Canada. With Look closed, he had continued to work as often as he could. He photographed two stories for Vermont Life, a magazine edited at the time by his son Brian and became a freelance photographer. In 1973, he won a Guggenheim fellowship. In 1975, he was a visiting professor at the Minneapolis Institute of Arts.

In Vachon's later years, he was teaching a class in photography where he kept notebooks on the main points of the day. For December 9, 1974 he reflects on it earlier assignment he had given his students to emulate the work of FSA photographers. Vachon continued as a freelancer until his death of cancer in 1975, in New York at age 60.

== Timeline ==
- 1914: May 19 Born, St. Paul, Minn.
- 1934: B.A., St. Thomas College, St. Paul, Minn.
- 1936–1937: Assistant messenger, Farm Security Administration, Washington, D.C.
- 1937–1940: Junior file clerk and unofficial photographer, Farm Security Administration, Washington, D.C. circa
- 1938: Married Millicent (“Penny”) Leeper (died 1960)
- 1940–1942: Junior photographer, Farm Security Administration, Washington, D.C.
- 1942–1943: Photographer, Office of War Information, Washington, D.C.
- 1943–1944: Photographer, Standard Oil Co. of New Jersey
- 1945: Served in United States Army 1945–1947 Photographer in New Jersey and Venezuela for Jersey Standard
- 1946: Photographic assignment, United Nations Relief and Rehabilitation Administration, Poland
- 1947–1949: Staff photographer, Life magazine, New York, N.Y.
- 1947–1971 Staff photographer, Look magazine, New York, N.Y. 1961 Married Françoise Fourestier
- 1971–1975 Freelance photographer, New York, N.Y.
- 1975 Visiting lecturer in photography, Minneapolis Institute of Arts, Minneapolis, Minn. 1975, Apr. 20 Died, New York, N.Y.

== Gallery ==
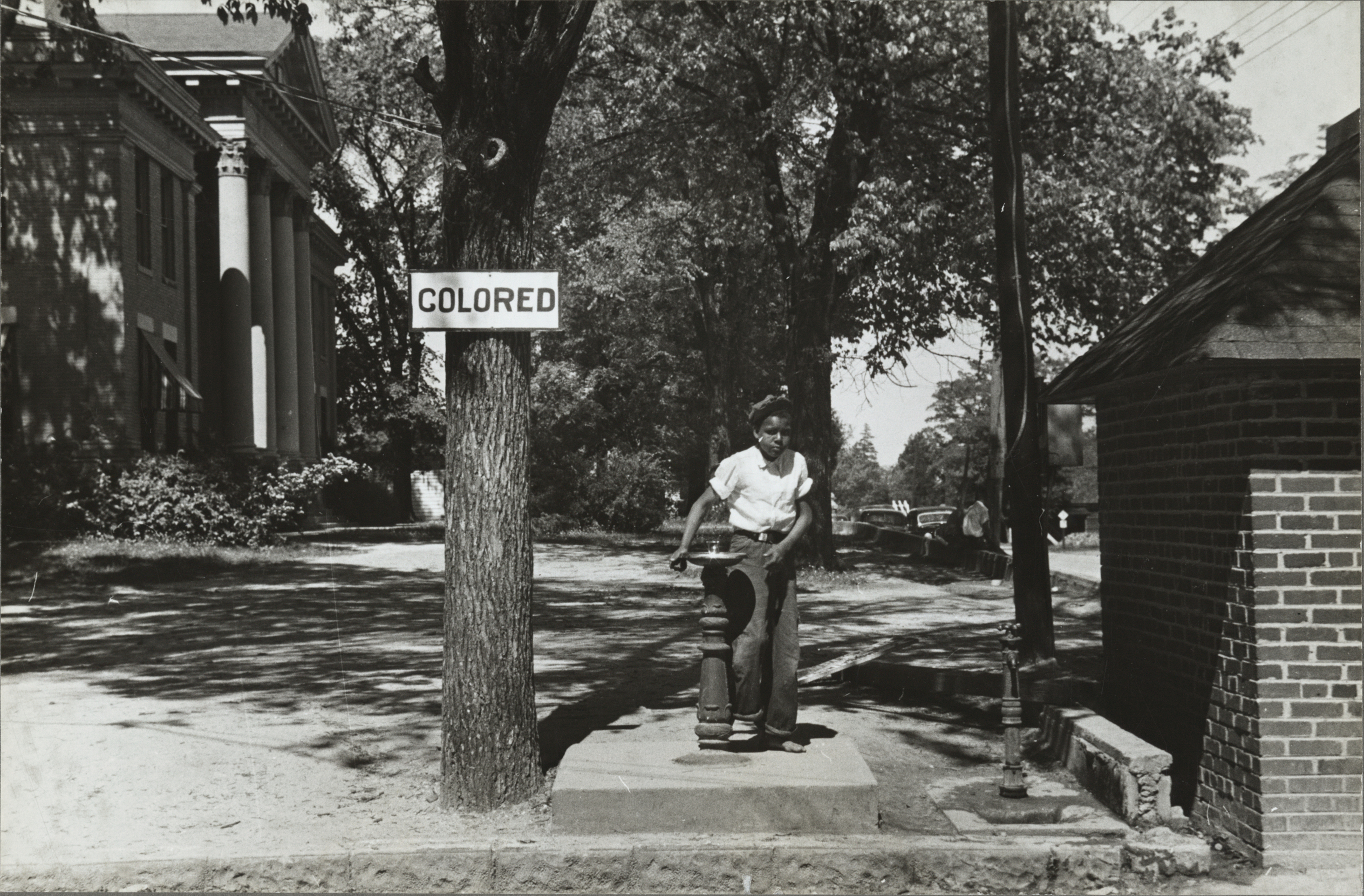
Segregated drinking fountain on the Halifax County Courthouse, North Carolina, April 1938.

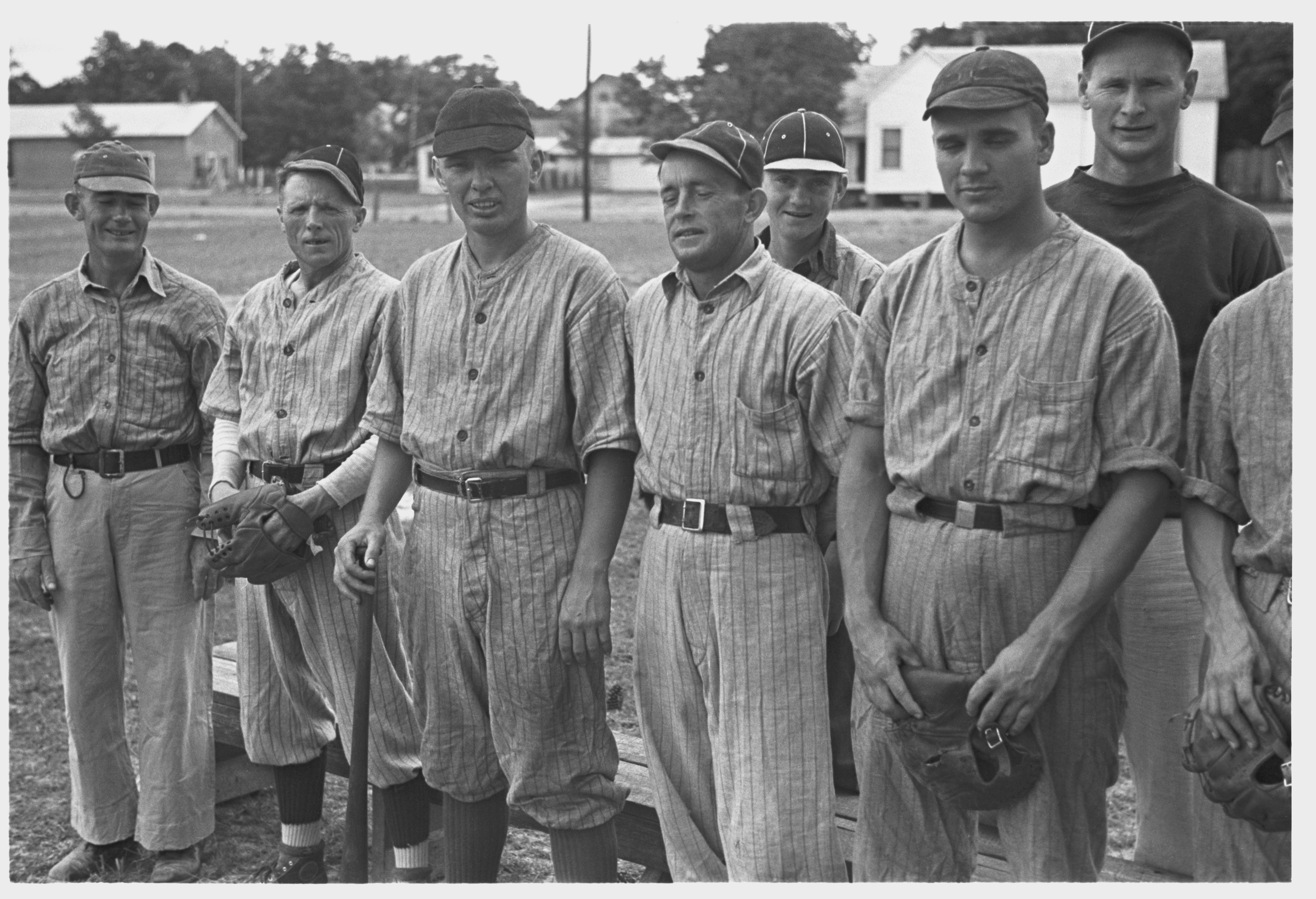
1938 Ball team at Irwinville Farms, Georgia

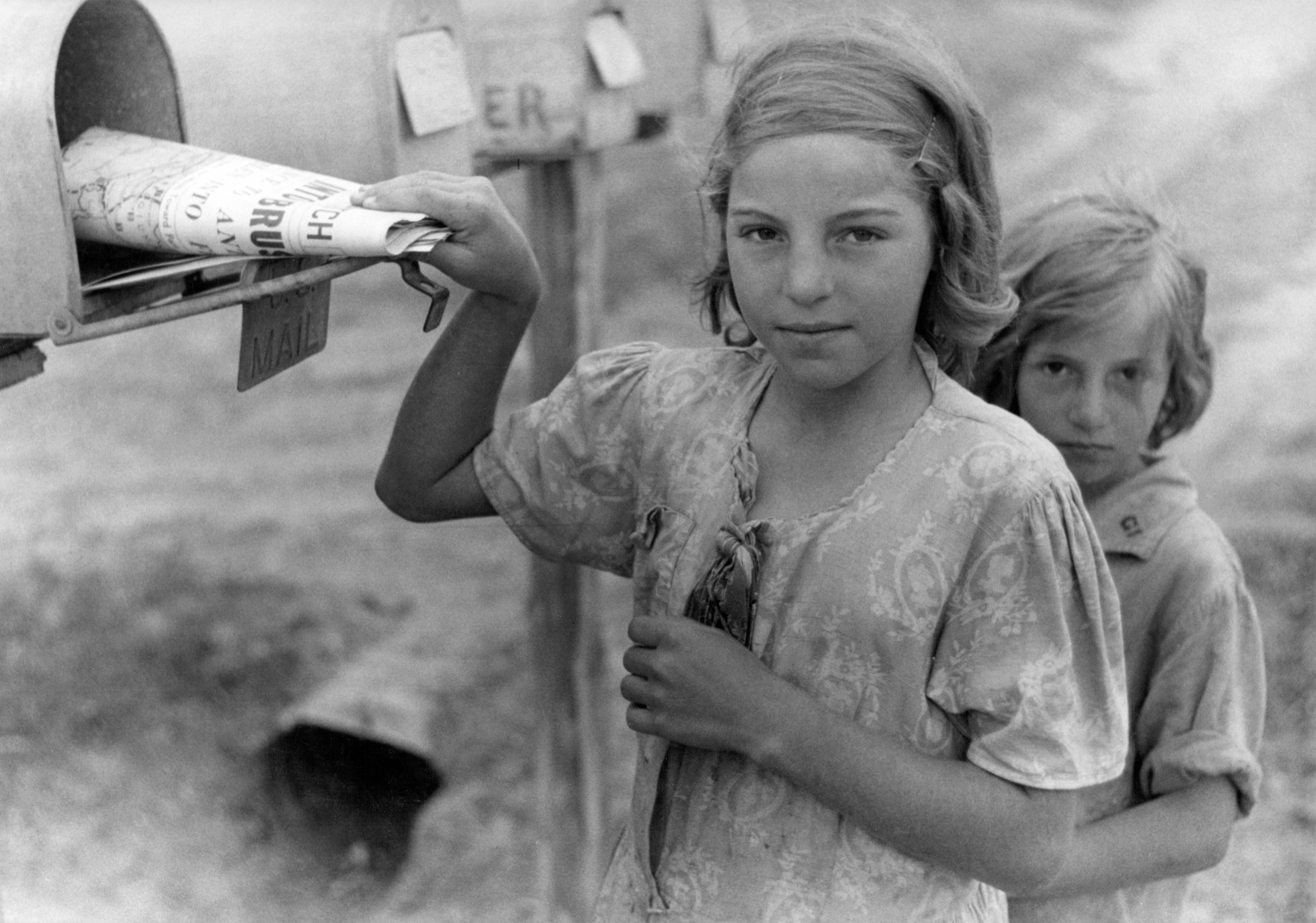
Ozark children getting mail from RFD box, Missouri, May 1940

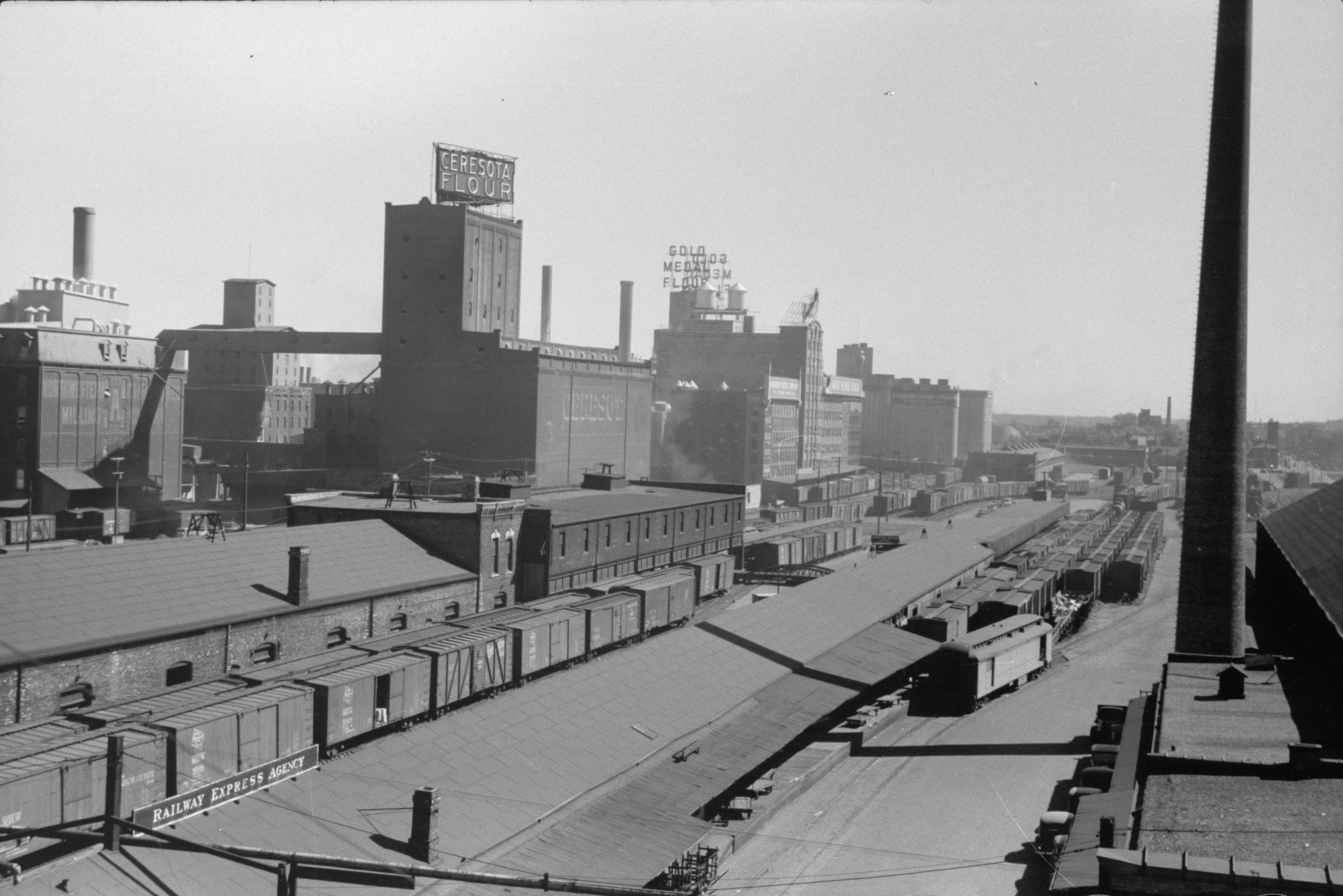
Flour mills and railroad cars, Minneapolis, Minnesota, 1939

Bethlehem Steel mill, Sparrows Point, Maryland, September 1940

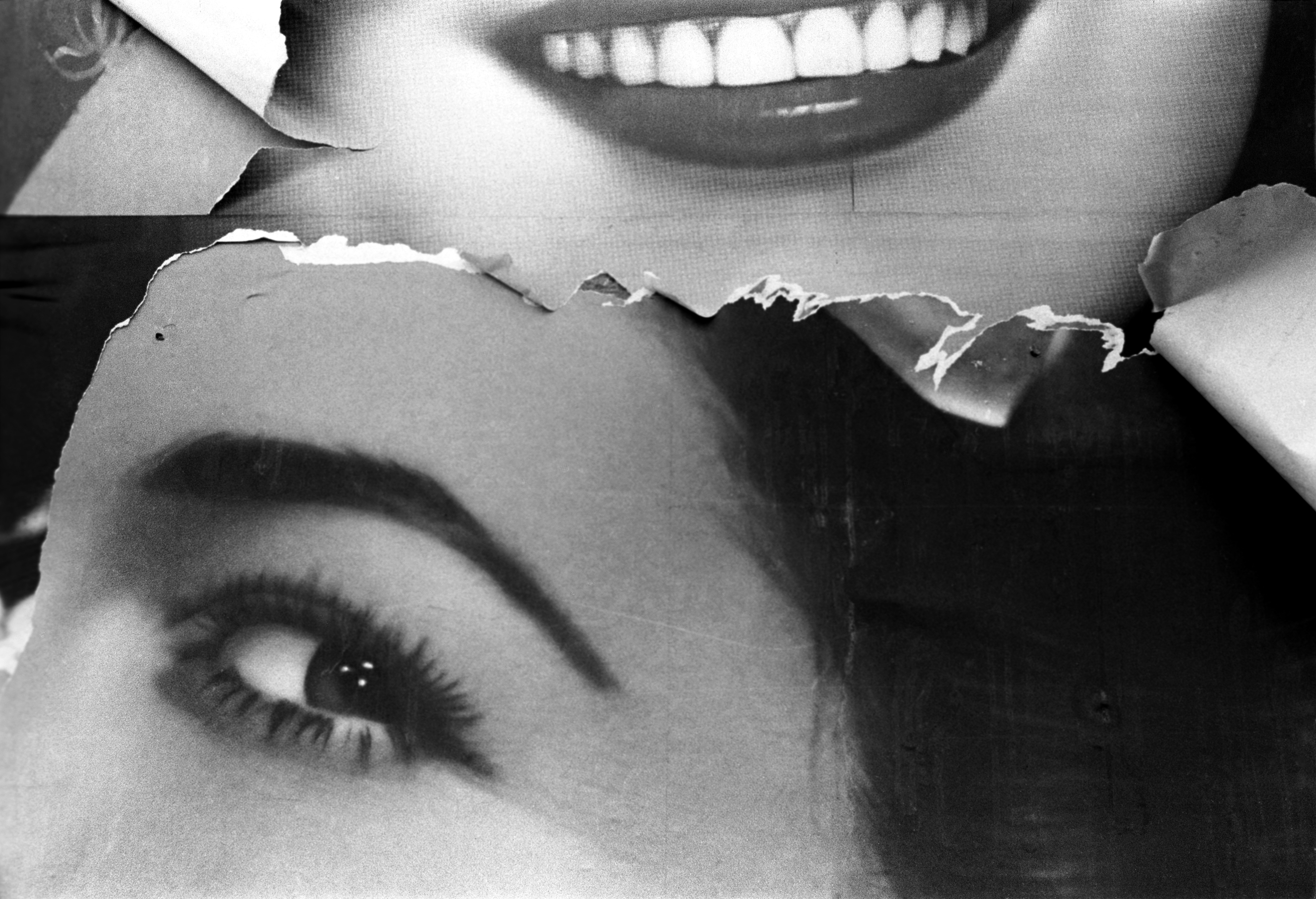
Advertisements, Woodbine, Iowa, 1940

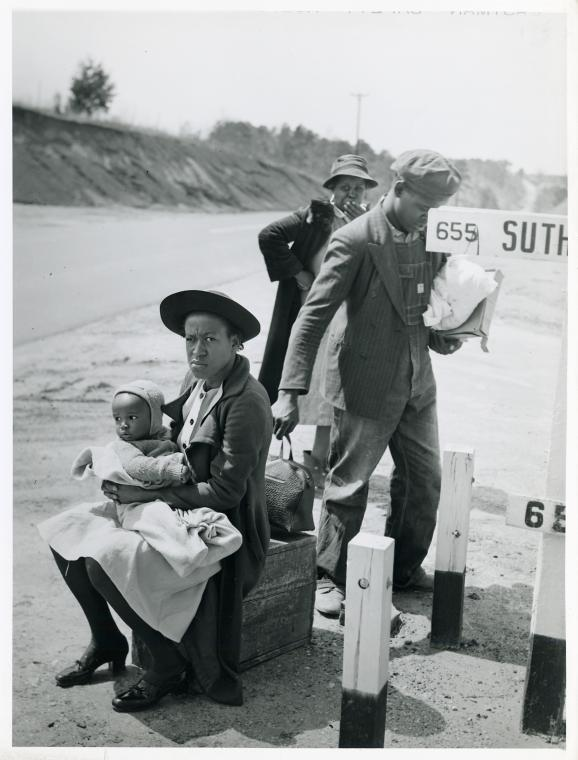
Original caption: "Negro Family waiting for ride into town", Halifax County, Virginia, March 1941

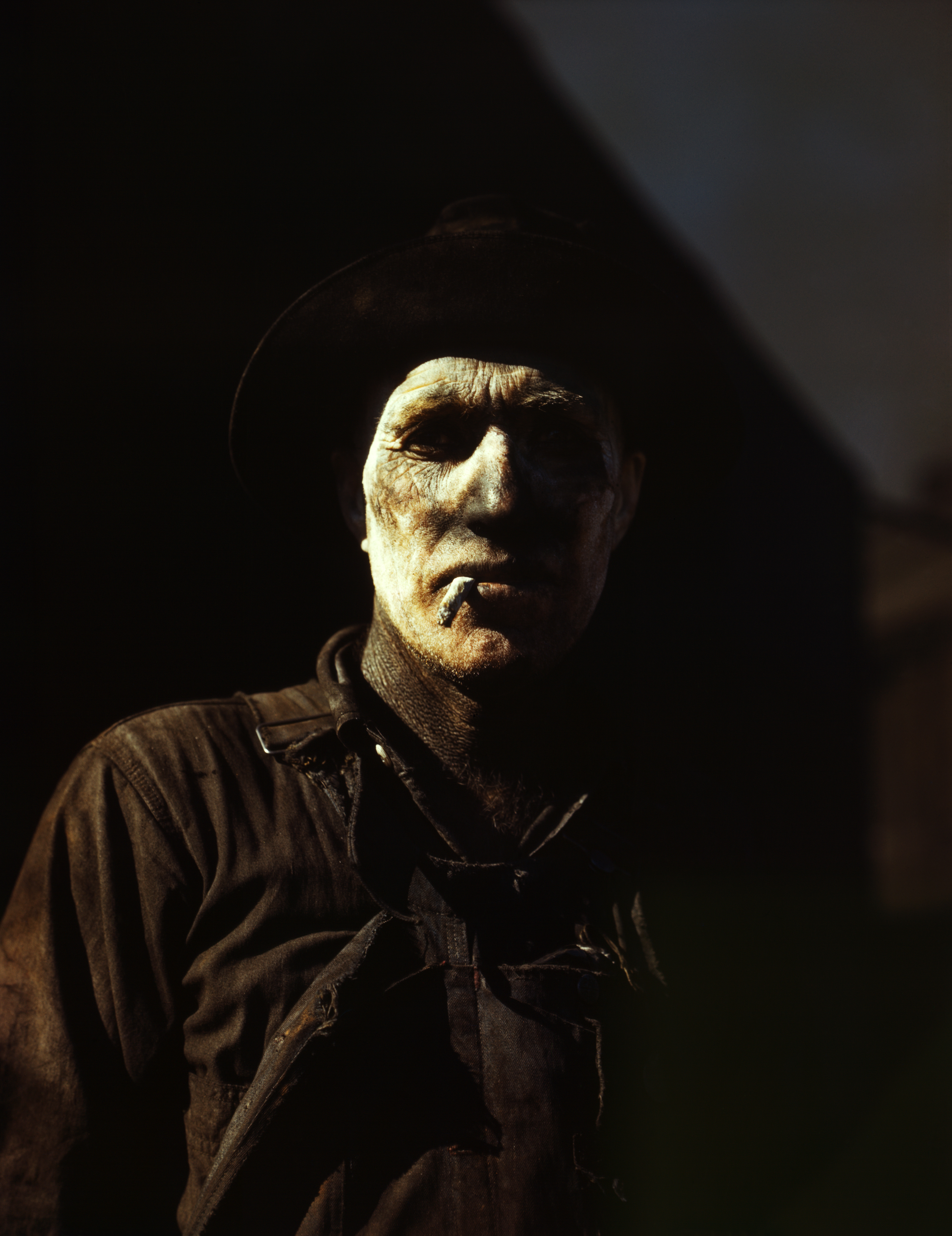
Worker at carbon black plant in Sunray, Texas, 1942.

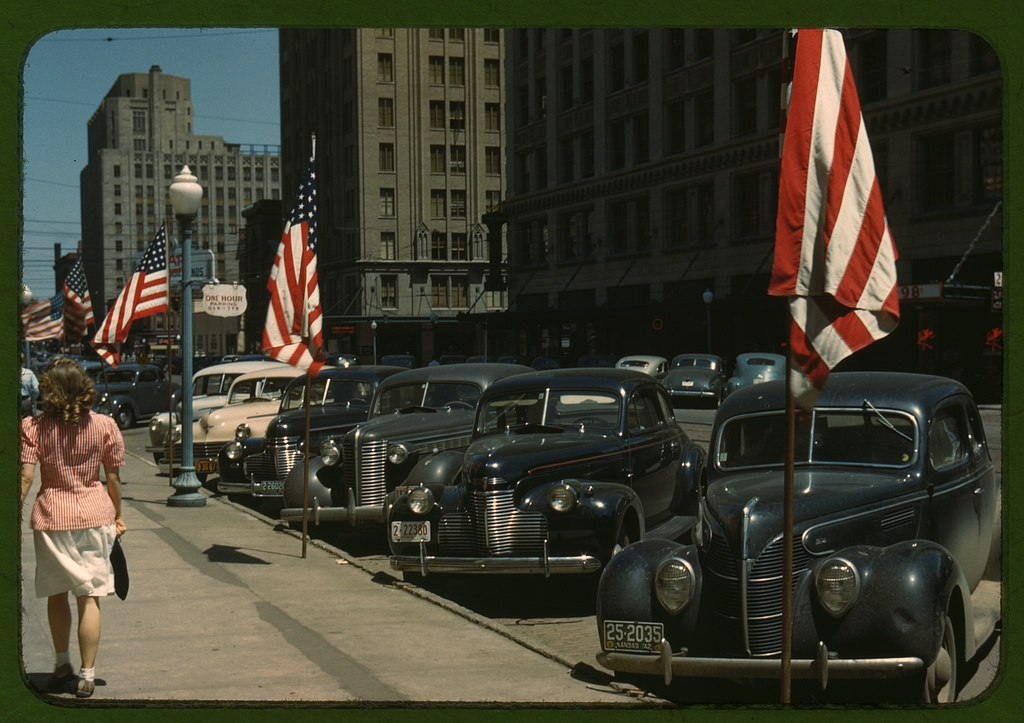
Lincoln, Nebraska, 1942

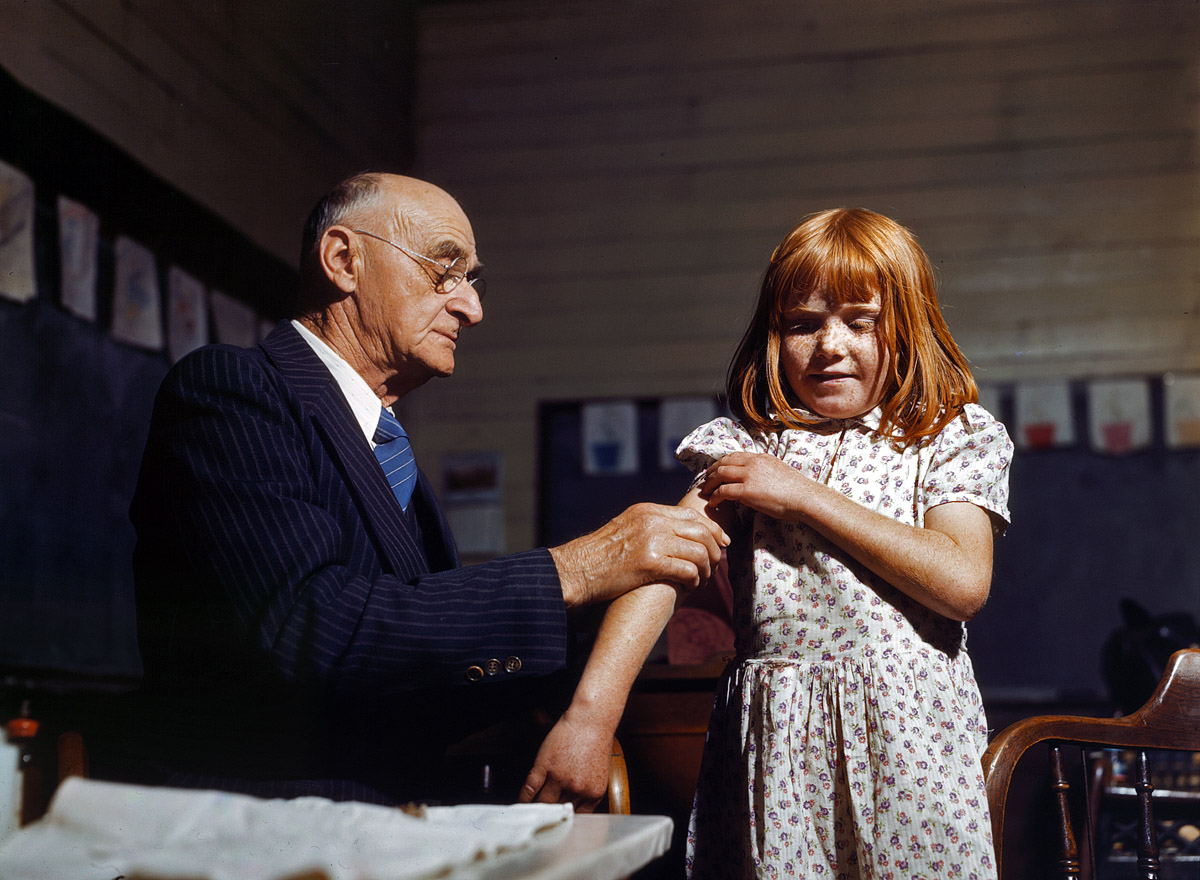
Doctor administering a typhoid vaccination at a school in San Augustine County, Texas, April 1943.

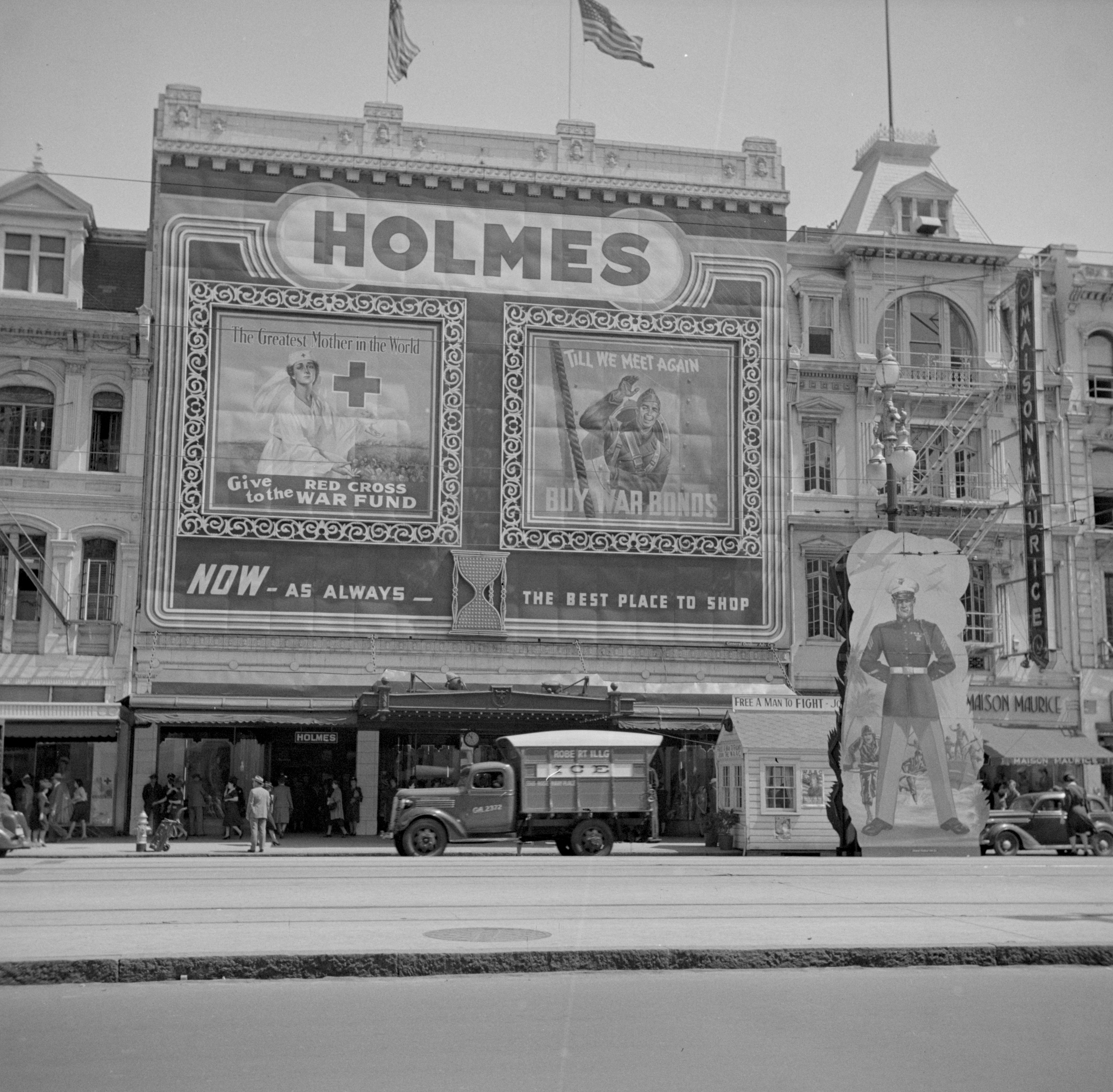
Department store with war-related advertisements, New Orleans, Louisiana, 1943

Ramp boats under construction at the Higgins shipyards, New Orleans, Louisiana, 1943

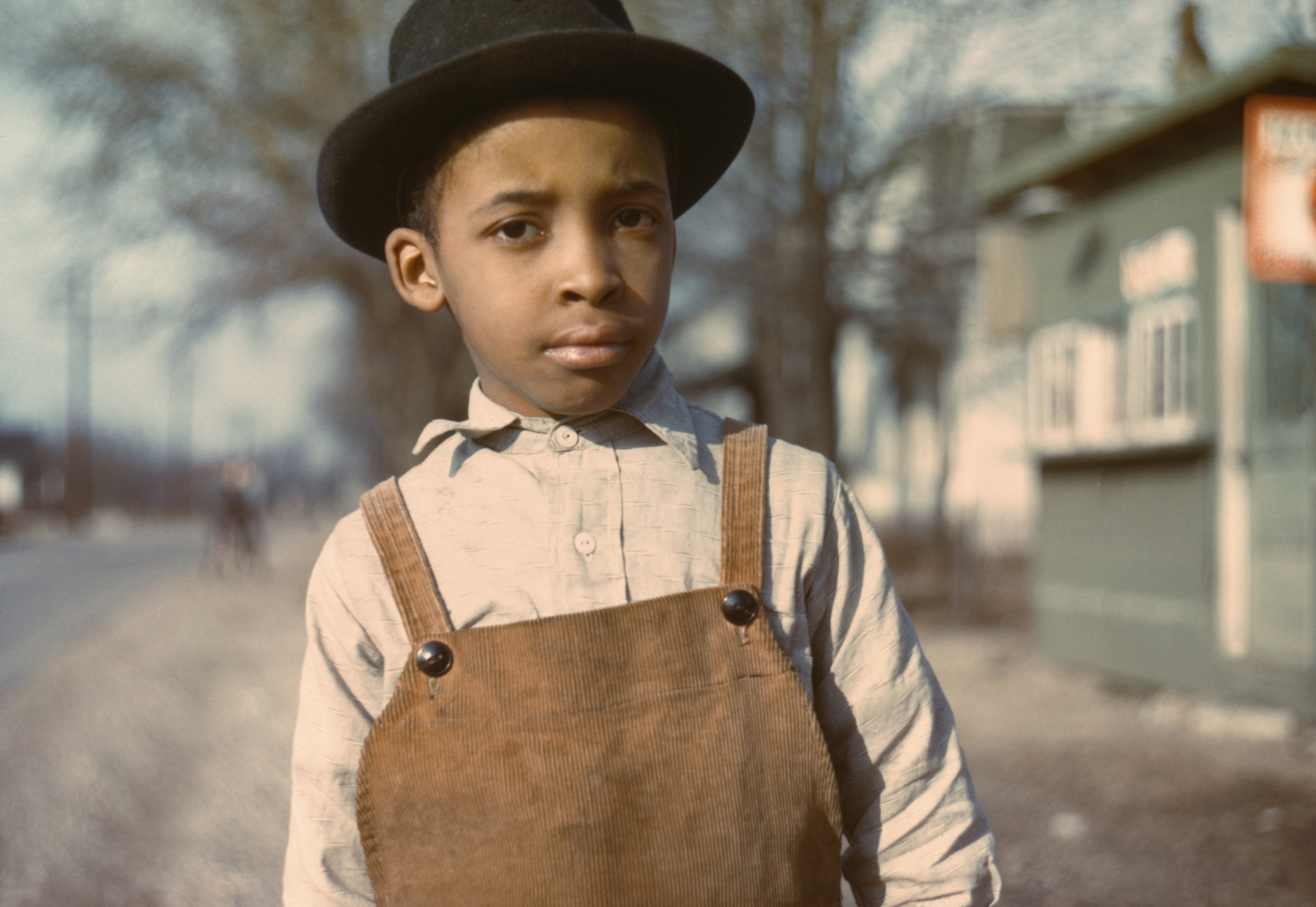
African American boy, Cincinnati, Ohio, 1942 or 1943.

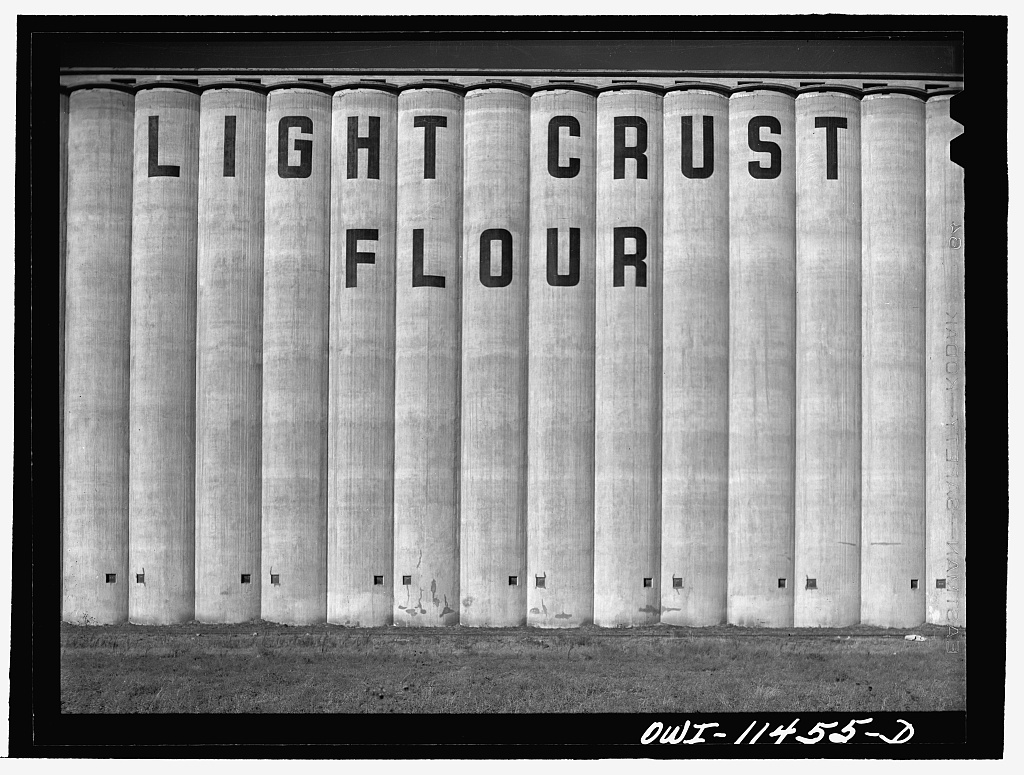
Grain elevator in Amarillo, Texas, November 1942
