= Richard Saunders (photographer) =

Bermudian photographer

- Born: July 22, 1922; Hamilton, Bermuda
- Died: August 20, 1987 (aged 65); Washington, DC
- Known for: photography

Richard Saunders (July 22, 1922 – August 15, 1987) was a Bermudian photographer of the 20th century. He was noted for his photojournalism work with Roy Stryker, as well as in publications such as Ladies Home Journal, Fortune, Ebony and Look, among others.

== Early life ==
Richard Clive Saunders was born on July 22, 1922, in seggregated Hamilton, Bermuda, as the son of Richard G Saunders and Daisy Young. He had an older brother, Cyril. His interest in photography began at a young age. In 1930, at age eight, Saunders and his family moved to the United States.

At the outbreak of World War II, the family returned to Bermuda where Saunders worked as a photographer with the police department. During the 1940s, Saunders returned to the United States and began photography training at Brooklyn College and the New School for Social Research in New York City. He became friends with photographer and artist Gordon Parks, and acquired a job as a photographic lab technician, which enabled him to study and learn the techniques of the top photojournalists at Life magazine. He won honorable mention in Life magazine's Young Photographer Contest picture story division in 1951.

== Career ==
In the early 1950s, Saunders was invited by Roy Stryker to join his team of top photojournalists in Pittsburgh to document the city's transition from a smoky milltown to a modern city. Saunders spent nearly two years there, living in the Hill District, where he "became part of the environment" and took four to five thousand photographs of the community. Many of his photos from this period are now part of the collection of the Carnegie Library of Pittsburgh.

During the 1950s, Saunders went on assignments for top publications such as Ladies Home Journal, Fortune, Ebony, and Look, among others. He also travelled to Latin America to document the Alliance for Progress, an economic development program sponsored by the U.S. government.

In 1967, Saunders joined the staff of Topic, a magazine of the United States Information Agency (USIA), published quarterly in English and French in sub-Saharan Africa. Based in Tunis, he travelled throughout Africa photographing events, leaders and ordinary people. In 1972 he was transferred to Topic's Washington, D.C. office. In 1973, USIA held an exhibition of Saunders’ work in Africa, which showcased 59 of his best photographs and toured the continent for two years. Saunders continued to travel and photograph in Africa until his retirement in 1986.

In addition to his magazine work, Saunders exhibited his work in group and one-person shows. He was also affiliated with Black Star Publishing Company.

Richard Saunders died on August 20, 1987.

Saunders's work was included in the 2025 exhibition Photography and the Black Arts Movement, 1955–1985 at the National Gallery of Art.

His work is in the collections of the Bermuda National Gallery, the Carnegie Museum of Art, the New York Public Library,
