= Arnold S. Eagle =

Hungarian-American photographer

Arnold Eagle (1909 - October 25, 1992) was a Hungarian-American photographer and cinematographer, known for his socially concerned documentary photographs of the 1930s and 1940s.

== Life ==
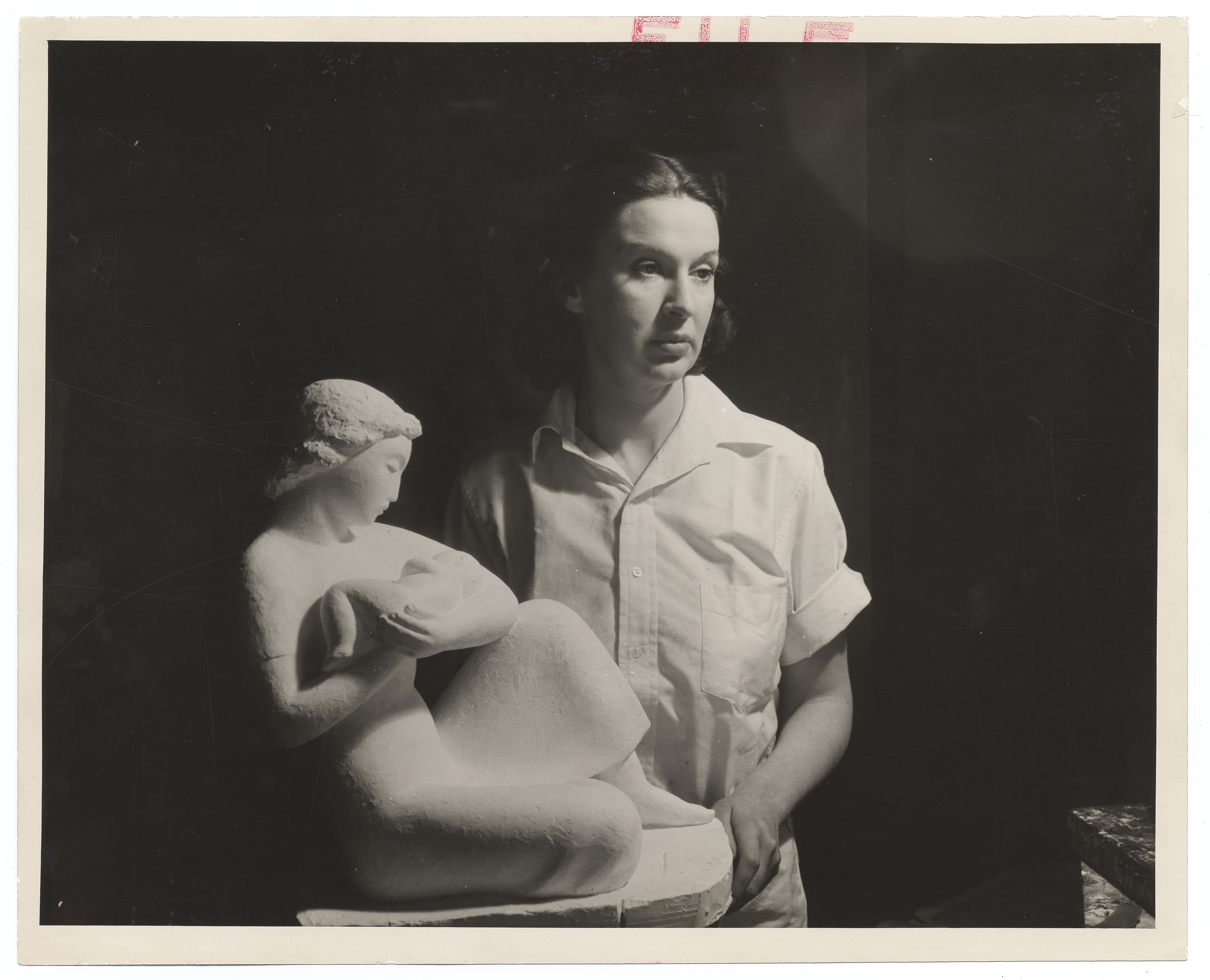
Helen Gaulois in her studio with sculpture, January 27, 1938

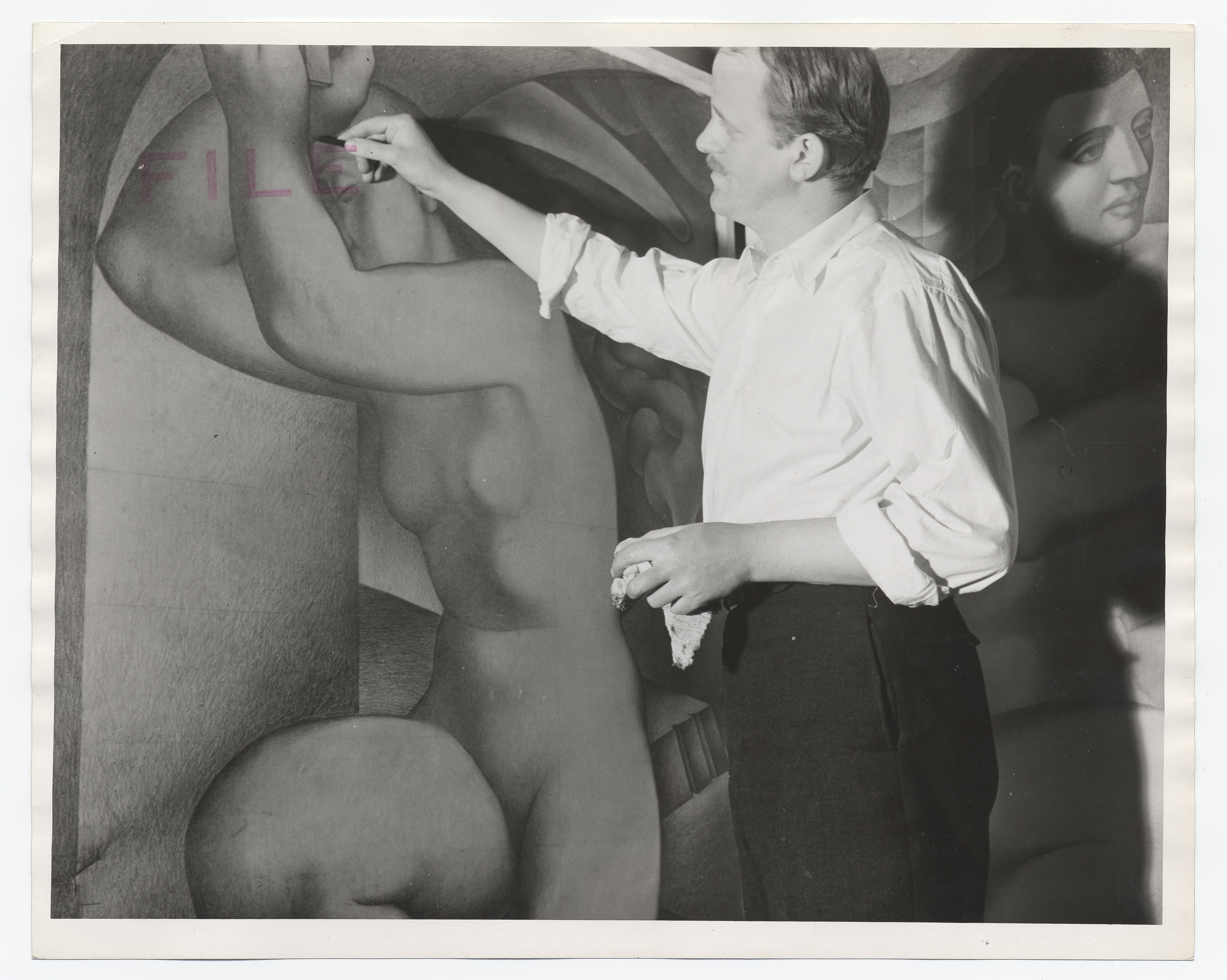
Eric Mose working on Lincoln Hospital murals, January 1, 1935

Eagle emigrated from Hungary to Brooklyn with his family in 1929.

He joined the Workers Film and Photo League in 1932 to use his art to promote radical social change. In 1935, the Works Progress Administration hired him to photograph New York slums, the Second Avenue El district and the Lower East Side. In 1936, he joined the Photo League as one of the earliest members and later formed the War Production Group within the Photo League in 1942. Eagle freelanced for Fortune, The Saturday Evening Post, and other magazines.

Through the Federal Art Project in 1938, he photographed the Jewish community on the Lower East Side. These photographs were published in the 1992 book At Home Only With God: Believing Jews and Their Children, with an essay by Arthur Hertzberg.

Photo League photographers Eagle, Sol Libsohn and David Robbins exhibited a series of photographs of slum districts in New York at the Federal Art Gallery in New York in 1938. The series was inspired by Franklin D. Roosevelt's "one-third of a nation" (the ill-clothed, ill-housed and ill-nourished) strategy.

Eagle was the director of the photography workshop of the National Youth Administration with his assistant, Harold Corsini, from 1939 to 1942. He worked with Roy Stryker on the Standard Oil Project from 1943 to 1947. He was the still photographer for the 1948 film Louisiana Story by Robert J. Flaherty and the cinematographer for the 1947 film Dreams That Money Can Buy by Hans Richter, as well as several of his own documentary films.

Eagle was a professor of photography at the New School for Social Research from 1955 until shortly before his death.

== Recent exhibitions (selection) ==
- November 4, 2011 – March 25, 2012 "The Radical Camera: New York's Photo League, 1936-1951" at The Jewish Museum
