= Elliott Erwitt =

French-born American photographer (1928–2023)

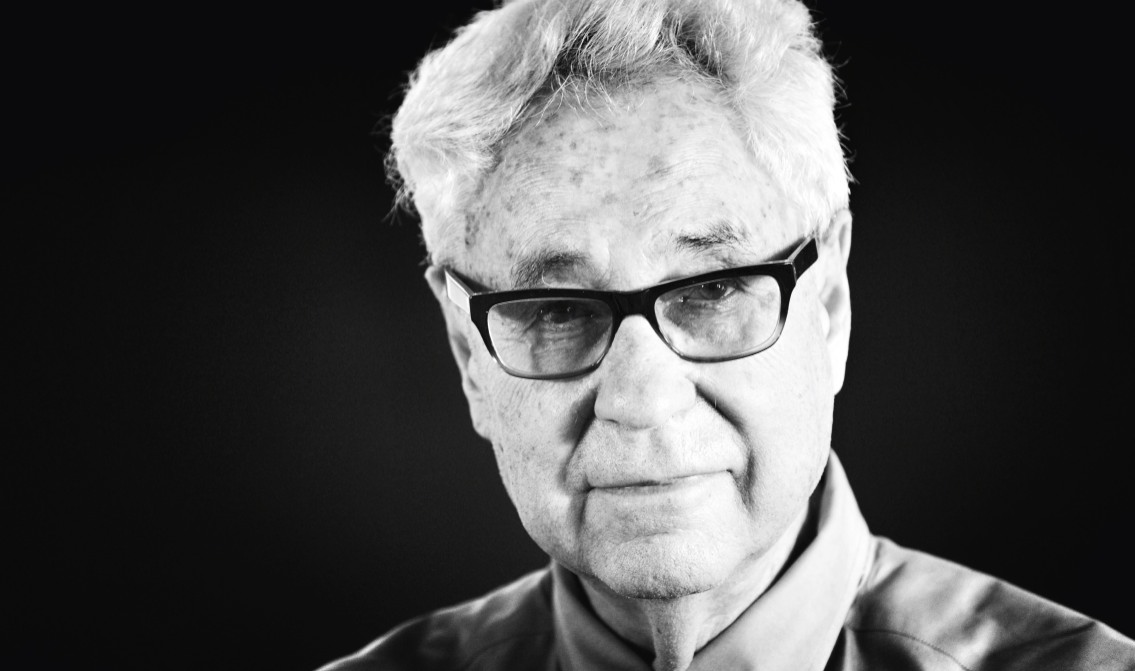
- Erwitt in 2014
- Born: Elio Romano Erwitz; July 26, 1928; Paris, France
- Died: November 29, 2023 (aged 95); New York City, U.S.
- Occupation: Photographer
- Spouse: Lucianne Van Kan (m. 1953; div. 1960) Diane Dann (m. 1968; div. 1975) Susan Ringo (m. 1977; div. 1984) Pia Frankenberg (m. 1995; div. 2010)

Elliott Erwitt (born Elio Romano Erwitz, July 26, 1928 – November 29, 2023) was a French-born American advertising and documentary photographer known for his black and white candid photos of ironic and absurd situations within everyday settings. He was a member of Magnum Photos since 1953.

== Early life ==
Elliott Erwitt was born in Paris, France, on July 26, 1928, to Jewish-Russian immigrant parents, Eugenia and Boris Erwitz, who soon moved to Italy. In 1939, when he was 10 years old, his family migrated to the United States. He studied photography and filmmaking at Los Angeles City College and the New School for Social Research. In 1951, he was drafted into the Army. He was discharged in 1953.

== Photography career ==
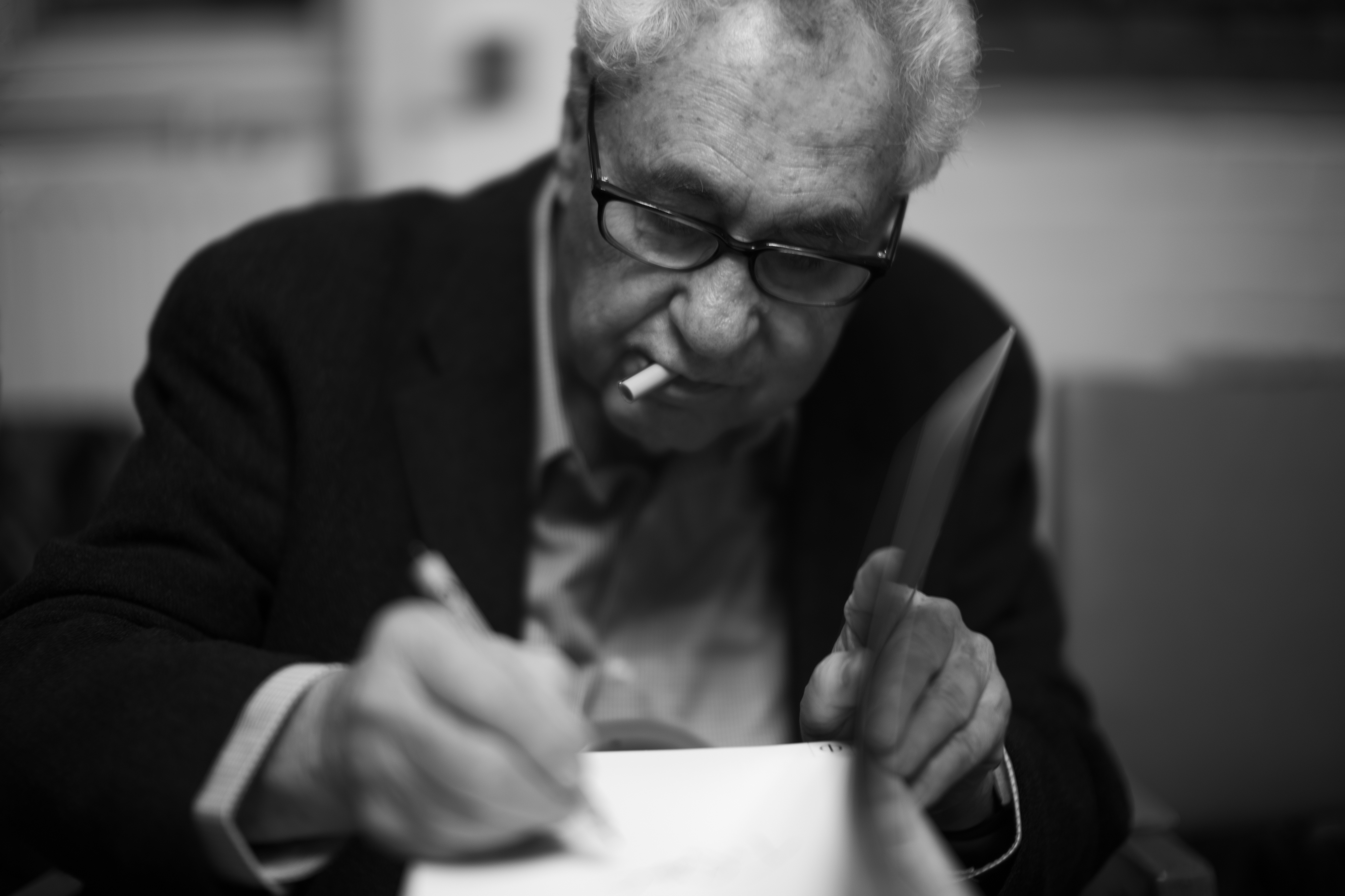
Vienna, 2012

Erwitt served as a photographer's assistant in the 1950s in the United States Army while stationed in France and Germany. After moving to New York in 1948, he met the photographers Edward Steichen, Robert Capa and Roy Stryker. Stryker, the former Director of the Farm Security Administration's photography department, hired Erwitt to work on a photography project for the Standard Oil Company. He then began a freelance photographer career and produced work for Collier's, Look, Life and Holiday. Erwitt was invited to become a member of Magnum Photos by the founder Robert Capa in 1953.

Again and again he has also documented socio-political events in his photographs, such as Richard Nixon's visit to the Soviet Union in 1959, the funeral service for John F. Kennedy in 1963 or the inauguration of Barack Obama in 2009.

One of the subjects Erwitt has frequently photographed in his career is dogs. They have been the subject of five of his books, Son of Bitch (1974), To the Dogs (1992), Dog Dogs (1998), Woof (2005), and Elliott Erwitt's Dogs (2008).

Erwitt created an alter ego, the beret-wearing and pretentious "André S. Solidor" (which abbreviates to "ass"), "a contemporary artist, from one of the French colonies in the Caribbean, I forget which one" to "satirise the kooky excesses of contemporary photography." His work was published in a book, The Art of André S. Solidor (2009), and exhibited in 2011 at the Paul Smith Gallery in London.

Erwitt was awarded the Royal Photographic Society's Centenary Medal in 2002, a Royal Photographic Society Honorary Fellowship in 1994, and the International Center for Photography's Infinity Award, Lifetime Achievement category, in 2011.

== Filmmaking career ==
From the 1970s, he devoted much of his energy toward movies. His feature films, television commercials, and documentary films included Arthur Penn: the Director (1970), Beauty Knows No Pain (1971), Red, White and Bluegrass (1973) and the prize-winning Glassmakers of Herat, Afghanistan (1977). He was, as well, credited as camera operator for Gimme Shelter (1970), still photographer for Bob Dylan: No Direction Home (2005), and provided additional photography for Get Yer Ya Ya's Out (2009).

A collection of Erwitt's films were screened in 2011 as part of the DocNYC Festival's special event "An Evening with Elliott Erwitt".

== Philanthropy ==
In October 2020, Erwitt partnered with the digital collectible cards company Phil Ropy and created a card to raise awareness for Project HOPE's COVID-19 response. The picture on the card shows a pair of medical rubber gloves as a reminder of how exposed health-care workers are and as an allusion to Project HOPE's logo. The proceeds from the sales of the card are redistributed to the organization.

== Personal life ==
Erwitt was married to the German filmmaker and writer Pia Frankenberg from 1998 to 2012.

== Death ==
Erwitt died at his home in New York on November 29, 2023, while sleeping. He was 95.

== Publications ==
- 1972 – Photographs and Anti-Photographs ISBN 978-0500540091
- 1972 – Observations on American Architecture ASIN B00A6V15X4
- 1974 – Elliott Erwitt: The Private Experience (In the series "Masters of Contemporary Photography", text by Sean Callahan.) Los Angeles: Petersen. Sean Callahan describes and to some extent explains Erwitt's work. ISBN 0-8227-0070-0
- 1974 – Son of Bitch, photographs of dogs ISBN 978-0670657223
- 1978 – Recent Developments ISBN 978-0671246464
- 1988 – Personal Exposures ISBN 978-0393026160
- 1991 – On the Beach ISBN 978-2883300033
- 1992 – To The Dogs ASIN B01FKWM9J2
- 1993 – The Angel Tree
- 1994 – Between the Sexes ISBN 978-0393036763
- 1997 – 100+1 Elliott Erwitt ISBN 978-8878138094
- 1998 – Dog Dogs A collection of black and white photographs of dogs Erwitt was intrigued by throughout his world travels.ISBN 978-0760723036
- 1999 – Museum Watching ISBN 978-0714838946
- 2001 – Snaps. London & New York: Phaidon. A large anthology (over 500 pages) of Erwitt's work. ISBN 0-7148-4150-1
- 2002 – EE 60/60 ISBN 978-8480033299
- 2002 – Elliott Erwitt's Handbook ISBN 978-0971454835
- 2005 – Woof ISBN 978-0811851121
- 2009 – Elliott Erwitt's Rome. teNeues Publishing ASIN B01K0U46MC
- 2009 – Elliott Erwitt's New York ISBN 978-3832769253
- 2010 – The Art of Andre S. Solidor aka Elliott Erwitt ISBN 978-3832793623
- 2010 – Elliott Erwitt Personal Best ISBN 978-3832791629
- 2011 – Elliott Erwitt, Sequentially Yours ISBN 978-3832795788
- 2012 – Elliott Erwitt XXL – Special and Collectors Edition ISBN 978-3832796709
- 2013 – Elliott Erwitt's Kolor Kempen, Germany: teNeues ISBN 9783832795771.
- 2017 – Pittsburgh 1950 London. Gost. With an essay by Vaughn Wallace. Photographs made in Pittsburgh for Pittsburgh Photographic Library. ISBN 978-1-910401-12-5
- 2018 – Elliot Erwitt's Scotland. teNeues Publishing Company ISBN 978-3961711369
- 2021 – Found, Not Lost. London. Gost. ISBN 978-1910401316

== Exhibitions ==
- Roma. Fotografie di Elliott Erwitt, Museo di Roma, Rome, November 2009 – January 2010
- Elliott Erwitt: Personal Best, International Center of Photography, New York, May–August 2011
- Elliott Erwitt, Black & White and Kolor, A Gallery for Fine Photography, New Orleans, 2011
- Elliott Erwitt: Home Around The World, Harry Ransom Center, The University of Texas at Austin, 2016–2017
- Elliott Erwitt: Pittsburgh 1950, International Center of Photography, New York, 2018
- Elliott Erwitt: A retrospective, Musée Maillol, Paris, 2023
- Elliott Erwitt. Retrospective in Brussels, Grand Place, Brussels, 2024
- Elliott Erwitt. Vintages, Städtische Galerie Karlsruhe, 2024

== Iconic photographs ==
- USA, New York City, 1946 – Street-level shot comparing the size of a woman's feet to a chihuahua wearing a sweater.
- USA, North Carolina, Segregated Water Fountains, 1950.
- USA, New York City, 1953 – Image of Erwitt's wife looking at their baby on a bed lit by window light.
- USA, NYC, Felix, Gladys, and Rover, 1974 – Image of a woman's booted feet between that of a Great Dane's legs and a little chihuahua.
- USSR, Russia, Moscow, Nikita Khrushchev and Richard Nixon, 1959 – Powerful Cold War image in which Nixon is poking his index finger at Khrushchev's suit lapel.
- USA, California, 1955 – Image of a side-view mirror of an automobile parked facing a beach sunset, with a playful couple shown in the mirror as the focal point.

== Collections ==
Erwitt's work is held in the following permanent collections:

- Harry Ransom Center, Austin, TX
- International Center of Photography, New York, NY
- Jackson Fine Art, Atlanta, GA
- Met Museum, New York, NY
- International Photography Hall of Fame, St.Louis, MO
- Richard M. Ross Art Museum, Delaware, OH
