= Harold Corsini =

American photographer

Harold Corsini (August 28, 1919 – January 1, 2008) was an American photographer.

Harold Corsini was born to Italian immigrants in New York City and began his career there as a freelancer. A photo he took when he was about 16, an aerial shot of football players, is archived in the George Eastman Collection in Rochester, New York. He assisted Arnold S. Eagle for three years as a photography teacher for the National Youth Administration. Corsini admired the work of Roy Stryker's Farm Security Administration photographers and aspired to the documentary style they practiced. He joined the Photo League in 1938, "the only free camera club in New York City", whose members were socially concerned photographers.

After a stint with Life magazine, in 1943 Corsini joined the Standard Oil documentary project under Roy Stryker, where he worked longer than any other photographer. In 1950, he accompanied Stryker to Pittsburgh, Pennsylvania, and assisted him as head of the photographic department at the Pittsburgh Photographic Library. There he chronicled the city's first Renaissance, which included redevelopment of the Point and construction of Gateway Center. He remained in Pittsburgh when the PPL disbanded to begin his own commercial photography business. Eventually became the official photographer for U.S. Steel. Corsini's work with U.S. Steel reflected the industry from labor to output, and included industrial and technical pieces.

Corsini retired when he sold his studio in 1975, then joined the faculty at Carnegie Mellon University, where he taught for nine years.

His photographic work is held, in addition to the Pittsburgh Photographic Library, by the University of Louisville Photographic Archives, the George Eastman House Photo Collection, and the Carnegie Museum of Art. The University of Pittsburgh houses the Harold Corsini archives.

He died on New Year's Day 2008, aged 88, following a stroke. He was survived by his wife, two children, and a brother.

== Recent exhibitions (selection) ==
- November 4, 2011 - March 25, 2012 "The Radical Camera: New York's Photo League, 1936-1951" at Jewish Museum (New York)
- February - April 2004 "Iron & Steel" at Keith De Lellis Gallery
- May 13 – July 3, 1983 "Roy Stryker: U.S.A., 1943–1950" at International Center of Photography

== Books ==
- Carnegie Mellon: A Portrait, photographs (Pittsburgh: Carnegie Mellon University, 1986).
