= Pittsburgh Photographic Library =

Coordinates: 40.44269°N 79.95055°W

The Pittsburgh Photographic Library (PPL) is a photography repository held by the Carnegie Library of Pittsburgh of over 50,000 prints and negatives relating to history of Pittsburgh, Pennsylvania, United States. It is also the name of the core collection of roughly 18,000 photographs, which were taken from 1950 to 1953 as a documentation project headed by Roy Stryker, and which subsequently gave the current repository its name.

== History and notable features ==
PPL (People) was the brainchild of the Allegheny Conference on Community Development, a Pittsburgh regional planning association launched in 1944 to rebuild and clean up the notorious Smokey City. The Allegheny Conference hired Roy Stryker in 1950 to record the city before its famous urban renewal, dubbed Renaissance I, and to shoot positive images of the "progress" for national consumption. Stryker hired professional photographers and directed the project, based at the University of Pittsburgh.

Stryker used such photographers as James Blair, Esther Bubley, Harold Corsini, Elliott Erwitt, Clyde Hare, Russell Lee, Sol Libsohn, and Richard Saunders. The project effectively ended in 1953, though it did continue for several more years under the direction of Marshall Stalley, and then was phased out in the late 1950s.

The Library of Congress initially wanted to house PPL, but it was transferred to Carnegie Library of Pittsburgh in June 1960.
