= Todd Webb =

American photographer

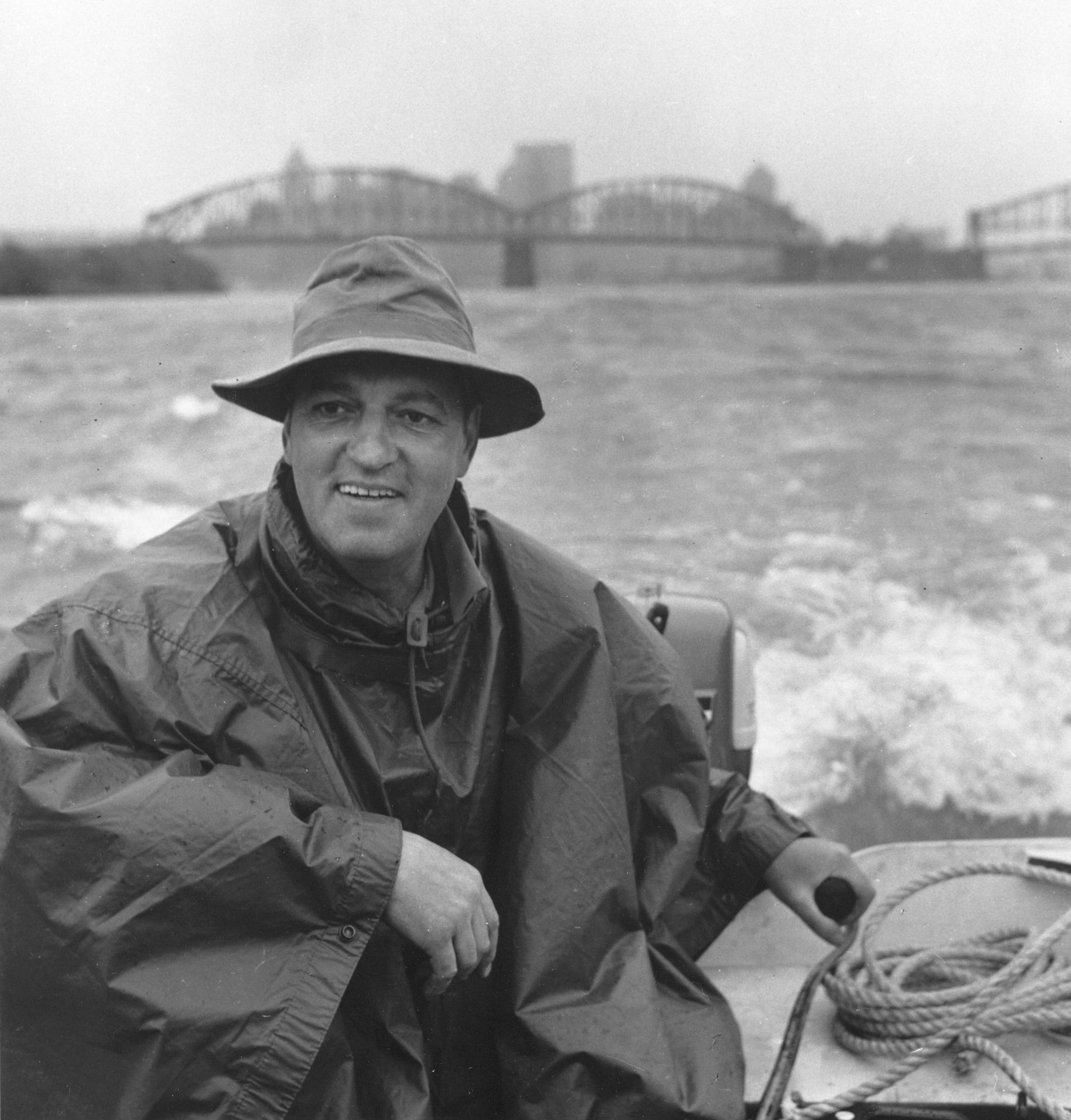
- Todd Webb
- Born: September 5, 1905; Detroit, Michigan, United States
- Died: April 15, 2000 (aged 94)
- Occupation: Photographer
- Years active: 1940–2000

Todd Webb (September 5, 1905 – April 15, 2000) was an American photographer notable for documenting everyday life and architecture in cities such as New York City, Paris as well as from the American west. He traveled extensively during his long life and had important friendships with artists such as Berenice Abbott, Walker Evans, Alfred Stieglitz, Georgia O'Keeffe, Ansel Adams, Dorothea Lange, and Harry Callahan.

== Early life ==
Webb was born in Detroit, United States, in 1905 and grew up there and in a Quaker community in Ontario. From 1924 to 1929 he worked as a bank teller and clerk at a brokerage firm in Detroit; in another account, he was a successful stockbroker during the 1920s but lost his earnings during the Crash before the Depression. During the Depression beginning in 1929, he moved to California and worked as a prospector and earned a meager living. During these years he also worked as a fire ranger for the United States Forestry Service. Webb reportedly wrote short stories which were unpublished. After 1934, Webb returned to Detroit and worked for the automobile manufacturer Chrysler in their export division. In 1937, he visited a friend in Panama in search of gold, but had little success. But in Panama, he brought along a camera donated by his former employer, Chrysler.

== Career ==
=== Early career ===
Webb returned to Detroit and studied at the Detroit Camera Club. He met photographer Harry Callahan. In 1940, he completed a ten‑day workshop with Ansel Adams as his teacher. In 1941, he visited Rocky Mountain State Park with Harry Callahan, and realized during this trip that he was drawn more to the urban cityscape, and although he found Adams to be an inspiration, he would not make photographs like his teacher. During World War II, Webb was a photographer for the United States Navy and was deployed to the South Pacific theater of operations.

=== New York City years ===
After World War II, in 1945, Webb moved to New York City and began his career as a professional photographer. He made key friendships with Alfred Stieglitz and Georgia O'Keeffe as well as Beaumont Newhall, Berenice Abbott, Helen Levitt, and Minor White. Webb began a remarkable project of walking the streets of New York City with his heavy camera and tripod and photographing people and buildings he encountered. What set these photos apart was their "straightforward, descriptive clarity" even though they were often of familiar views. One large 10-foot–long panorama photograph which was critically acclaimed showed a section of Sixth Avenue from 43rd–44th streets which, in 1991, was seen as a "visual time capsule of the city" and was described as a "stunner." Webb's photos reflected the photographer's sense of discovery and captured the times, such as photos of hand-painted banners over apartment house doors saying "Welcome Home, G.I.s". In one photograph, Webb went to the top of the RCA Building and shot south using a backlit technique, which captured the Empire State Building at night. The best photographs, according to New York Times art critic Charles Hagen, contained the "simple geometries of urban architecture" in a "simple elegance"; Hagen thought Webb's New York City photographs were his best. In 1946, he had his first solo exhibition of his photographs at the Museum of the City of New York.

In 1947, Webb was hired by Fortune magazine and he worked with professional photographers funded by the Standard Oil Company led by Roy Stryker and the group included notable photographers such as Sol Libsohn. According to the New York Times, the team of professional photographers was "given amazingly free rein by its corporate sponsor" to produce a documentary about oil. One of these photographs, Webb's Pittsburgh Panorama (ca. 1950) shows a grim industrial view towards Pittsburgh from a hill near Westinghouse Bridge that takes in a bare river valley across which snake highways and railways and a row of tall smokestacks in the distance. Curator Edward Steichen selected it for the 1955 Museum of Modern Art exhibition The Family of Man, seen by 9 million visitors on its world tour. However, in his memoir, Webb records his disappointment with the way images were "over-enlarged to billboard size" losing "all the qualities that make photographs unique."

Webb traveled to Paris, France, in 1949 and married fellow American Lucille Minqueau. In Paris, Webb produced a "vivid record" of the city which earned him recognition. Then, Webbs moved back to New York City to live in Greenwich Village in 1952.

=== 1955–1956, walking across America ===
In 1955, he was awarded a Guggenheim Fellowship to photographically record pioneer trails of early settlers of the western United States. During that year he walked from New York City to San Francisco.

=== 1957–1958, United Nations and Africa ===
Webb was hired in 1957 by the United Nations to photograph its General Assembly. He won a contract to photograph Sub–Saharan Africa in 1958. Over the course of six months, he photographed extensively in Ghana, Sudan, Togo, Somalia, Tanzania, and Ethiopia. These rich color images were published in 2021 as a book to complement the exhibition at the Minneapolis Institute of Art titled Todd Webb in Africa, Outside the Frame.

=== O'Keeffe years ===
The Webbs moved to Santa Fe in New Mexico around 1961. Webb's photos of his friend Georgia O'Keeffe suggested not only a "loner, severe figure and self-made person" but that there was an "intense connection" between Webb and O'Keeffe. While O'Keeffe was known to have a "prickly personality", Webb's photographs portray her with a kind of "quietness and calm" suggesting a relaxed friendship, and revealing new contours of O'Keeffe's character. Webb's landscape photographs as well as photos of the artist walking among the sagebrush bring O'Keeffe to life "even in pictures where she doesn't appear", according to Chicago Tribune art critic Abigail Foerstner. His photos suggest an "ageless spirit" which was "weathered and indomitable" like desert rock formations. These photos were done using matte finish paper and appear in a book entitled Georgia O'Keeffe: The Artist's Landscape.

=== Later years ===
The Webbs lived in the Provence region of France, around 1970, and he continued to photograph regularly, and later lived, for a period, in Bath, England. The Webbs finally settled in the state of Maine, living in the city of Portland, based on the suggestion of a friend. In 1978, Webb won a grant from the National Endowment for the Arts, and continued to live and work in Maine. Webb died in 2000 in Lewiston, Maine.

=== Legacy ===
Todd Webb's photographs have been displayed in 25 major museum collections including the MOMA in New York, and the National Gallery of Art in Washington, D.C. Webb's photographic archive is located in Portland, Maine, where reproduction rights and sales of his prints are managed.

In 2006, the Hallmark Greeting Cards Corporation acquired at least 161 of Webb's photographs, and in 2006 decided to give them away in a generous donation to the Nelson-Atkins Museum in Kansas City.

In 2017, the Todd Webb Archive refurbished its website with biographical data, collection information, and a column regarding news events. In April 2017, an exhibition titled "A City Seen" opened at the Museum of the City of New York. Curated by Sean Corcoran, the exhibit was a comprehensive survey of Webb's work in New York during the 1940s. The book I See a City: Todd Webb's New York (Thames & Hudson, 2017) was published in conjunction with the exhibition.

Webb's estate is managed by Betsy Evans Hunt who serves as the Executive Director of the Todd Webb Archive. In 2026, Webb's estate was acquired by the MUUS Collection.

== Awards ==
Webb was awarded the following:

- Guggenheim Fellowship, 1955 & 1956
- National Endowment for the Arts Grant, 1978

== Publications ==
The following publications relate to Todd Webb:

- Gold Strikes and Ghost Towns, Doubleday Press, 1961
- The Gold Rush Trails and The Road To Oregon, Doubleday Press, 1963
- Nineteenth Century Texas Homes, University of Texas Press, 1966
- Todd Webb/Photographs, The Amon Carter Museum
- Georgia O'Keeffe, The Artist's Landscape, Twelve Trees Press, 1984
- Todd Webb: Photographs of New York and Paris, Hallmark Cards, 1996
- Looking Back; Memoirs and Photographs, University of New Mexico, 1991
- Todd Webb: New York, 1946, 21st Editions, 2015
- I See a City: Todd Webb's New York, Thames & Hudson, 2017
- Todd Webb in Africa, Outside the Frame, Thames & Hudson, 2021

== Collections ==
Webb's work is in the following collections:

- Addison Gallery of American Art, Andover, Massachusetts
- Akron Art Museum, Akron, Ohio
- Allentown Art Museum, Allentown, Pennsylvania
- The American Embassy, Paris, France
- Amon Carter Museum, Fort Worth, Texas
- Biblioteque Nationale, Paris, France
- Bowdoin College Museum of Art, Bowdoin College, Brunswick, Maine
- Boston Athenaeum, Boston, Massachusetts
- Carnegie Museum, University of Maine at Orono, Orono, Maine
- Center for Creative Photography, Tucson, Arizona
- Chicago Art Institute, Chicago, Illinois
- Colby College Art Museum, Waterville, Maine
- Crystal Bridges Museum of American Art, Bentonville, Arkansas
- The David Winton Bell Gallery at Brown University, Providence, Rhode Island
- Denver Art Museum, Denver, Colorado
- George Eastman House, Rochester, New York
- Georgia O’Keeffe Museum, Santa Fe, New Mexico
- The J. Paul Getty Museum, Los Angeles, California
- Graham Nash Collection, Los Angeles, California
- Henry Art Gallery, University of Washington, Seattle, Washington
- Historic New Orleans Collection & Archives of American Art, New Orleans, Louisiana
- Institute of Art, Detroit, Michigan
- The International Center of Photography, New York City
- Judy and Leonard Lauder Collection, New York City
- Lehigh University Art Gallery, Bethlehem, Pennsylvania
- Los Angeles County Museum of Art, Los Angeles, California
- Metropolitan Museum of Art, New York City
- Middlebury College Museum of Art, Middlebury, Vermont
- Museum of Fine Arts, Boston, Massachusetts
- Museum of Fine Arts, Houston, Texas
- Museum of Fine Arts, Minneapolis, Minnesota
- Museum of Modern Art, Tokyo, Japan
- Museum of Modern Art (MOMA), New York City
- Museum of the City of New York, New York City
- The Nasher Museum of Art at Duke University
- The National Portrait Gallery, Washington, DC
- The National Museum, Tokyo, Japan
- The National Museum of Mexican Art, Chicago, Illinois
- The Nelson-Atkins Museum of Art, Kansas City, Missouri
- New Mexico Museum of Fine Arts, Santa Fe, New Mexico
- New York Public Library, New York
- Northwestern University, Chicago, Illinois
- The Painting Gallery, Munich, Germany
- Pomona College Museum of Art, Claremont, California
- Portland Museum of Art, Portland, Maine
- Rice University, Houston, Texas
- Rochester Institute of Art, Rochester, New York
- Royal Photographic Society, London, England
- San Antonio Museum of Art, San Antonio, Texas
- San Francisco Museum of Modern Art, San Francisco, California
- Santa Barbara Museum of Art, Santa Barbara, California
- Smith College Art Museum, Northampton, Massachusetts
- The Smithsonian Institution, Washington, DC
- University of New Mexico Art Museum, Albuquerque, New Mexico
- Worcester Museum of Art, Worcester, Massachusetts
