= Marion Post Wolcott =

American photographer

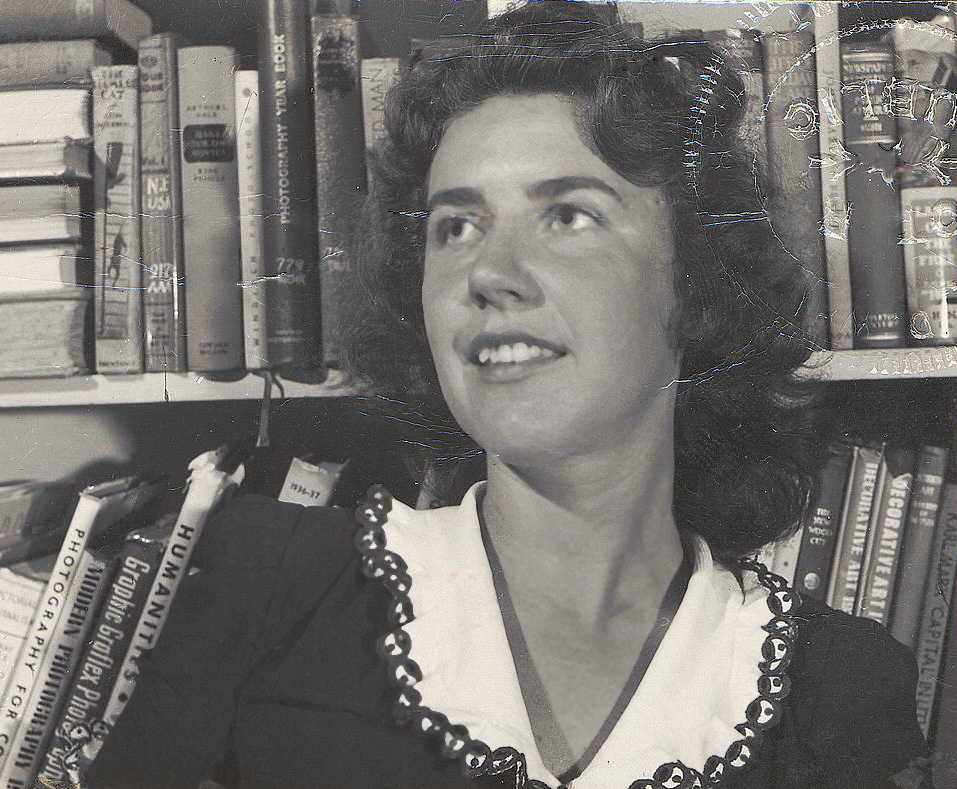
- Wolcott in 1940
- Born: June 7, 1910; Montclair, New Jersey, U.S.
- Died: November 24, 1990 (aged 80); Santa Barbara, California, U.S.
- Occupation: Photographer for the Farm Security Administration

Marion Post Wolcott (June 7, 1910 – November 24, 1990) was an American photographer who worked for the Farm Security Administration during the Great Depression, documenting poverty, the Jim Crow South, and deprivation.

== Early life ==
Marion Post was born in Montclair, New Jersey on June 7, 1910, to Marion (née Hoyt; known as "Nan") and Walter Post, a physician. She grew up in the family home in Bloomfield, the younger of two daughters in the Post family. Her parents divorced when she was thirteen and she was sent to boarding school, spending time at home with her mother in Greenwich Village when not at school. Here she met many artists and musicians and became interested in dance. She studied at The New School.

Post trained as a teacher, and went to work in a small town in Massachusetts. Here she saw the reality of the Depression and the problems of the poor. When the school closed she went to Europe to study with her sister Helen. Helen was studying with Trude Fleischmann, a Viennese photographer. Marion Post showed Fleischmann some of her photographs and was told to stick to photography.

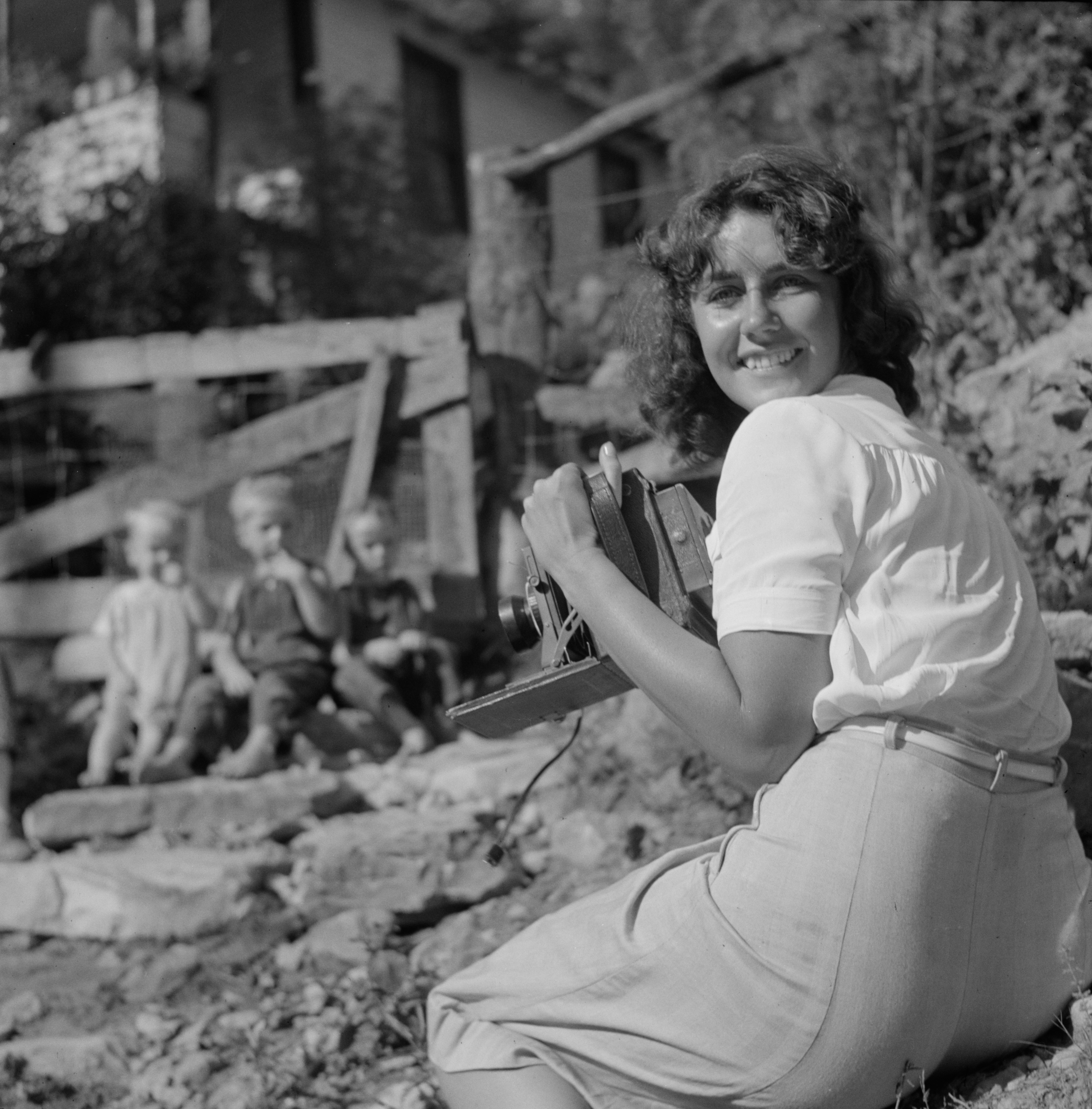
Post Wolcott, Kentucky, February 1940.

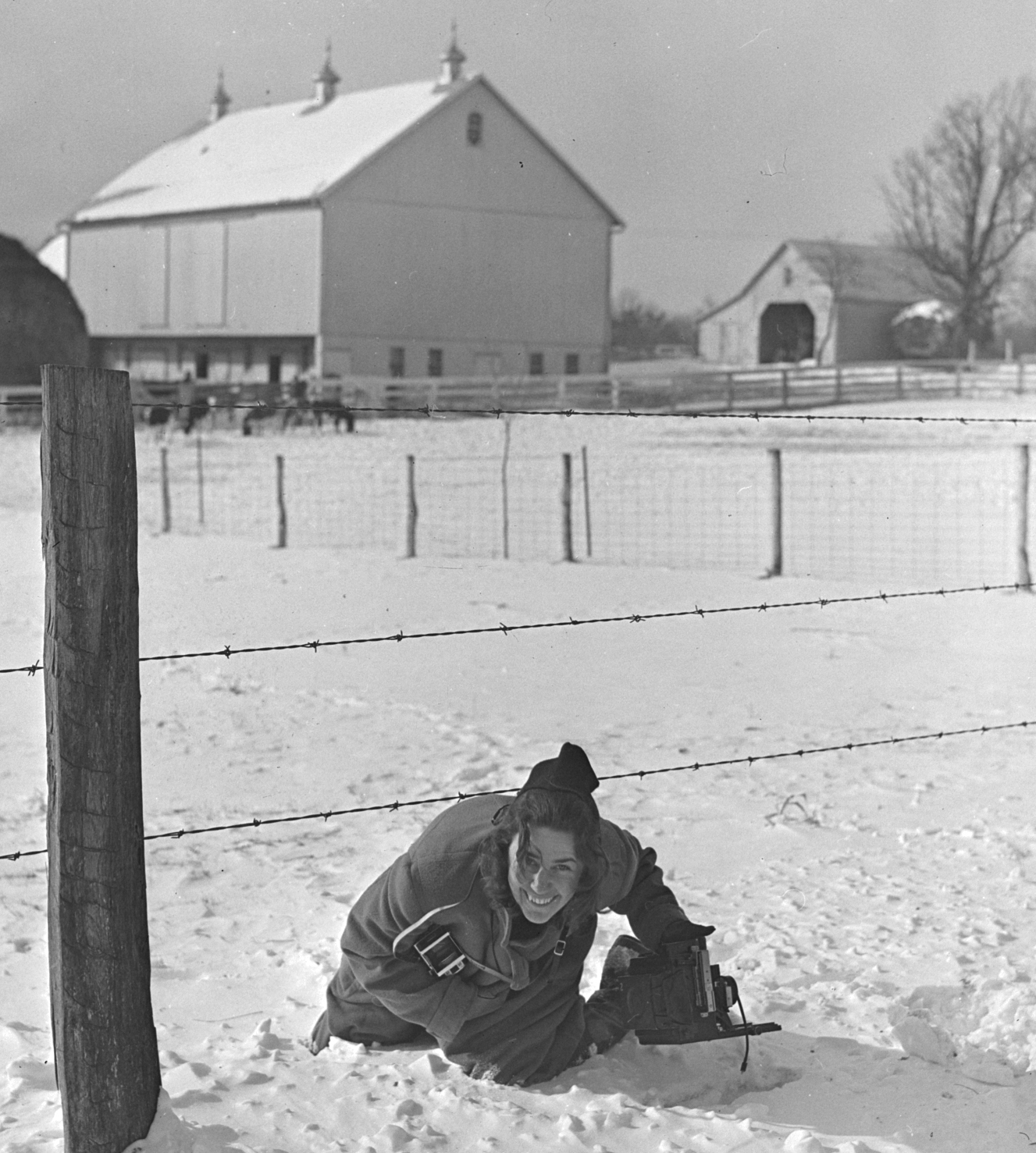
Post Wolcott with Rolleiflex and Speed Graphic in hand in Montgomery County, Maryland

== Career ==
While in Vienna she saw some of the Nazi attacks on the Jewish population and was horrified. Soon she and her sister had to return to America for safety. She went back to teaching but also continued her photography and became involved in the anti-fascist movement. At the New York Photo League she met Ralph Steiner and Paul Strand who encouraged her. When she found that the Philadelphia Evening Bulletin kept sending her to do "ladies' stories", Ralph Steiner took her portfolio to show Roy Stryker, head of the photography division of the Farm Security Administration, and Paul Strand wrote a letter of recommendation. Stryker was impressed by her work and hired her immediately.

Post's photographs for the FSA often explore the political aspects of poverty and deprivation. They also often find humour in the situations she encountered.

In 1938, the WPA photographer Marion Post Wolcott took a photo of Geneva Varner Clark of Varnertown alongside her three children. Varner was a resident of the community who at the time identified as Native American, referring to herself as a Summerville Indian. This is the only known photo of members of a Lowcountry indigenous community housed in the Library of Congress. The caption of the photos identifies Varner as a Brass Ankle, a derogatory term used to refer to someone of mixed race that passes as white.

In 1941 she met Leon Oliver Wolcott, deputy director of war relations for the U.S. Department of Agriculture under Franklin Roosevelt. They married, and Marion Post Wolcott continued her assignments for the FSA, but resigned shortly thereafter in February 1942. Wolcott found it difficult to fit in her photography around raising a family and a great deal of traveling and living overseas.

In the 1970s, a renewed interest in Post Wolcott's images among scholars rekindled her own interest in photography. In 1978, Wolcott mounted her first solo exhibition in California, and by the 1980s the Smithsonian and the Metropolitan Museum of Art began to collect her photographs. The first monograph on Marion Post Wolcott's work was published in 1983. Wolcott was an advocate for women's rights; in 1986, Wolcott said: "Women have come a long way, but not far enough. . . . Speak with your images from your heart and soul" (Women in Photography Conference, Syracuse, N.Y.).

Post Wolcott's work is archived at the Library of Congress and the Center for Creative Photography at the University of Arizona in Tucson, Arizona.

== Death ==
Post Wolcott died of lung cancer in Santa Barbara, California, on November 24, 1990.

== Gallery ==
All photographs are by Marion Post Wolcott.

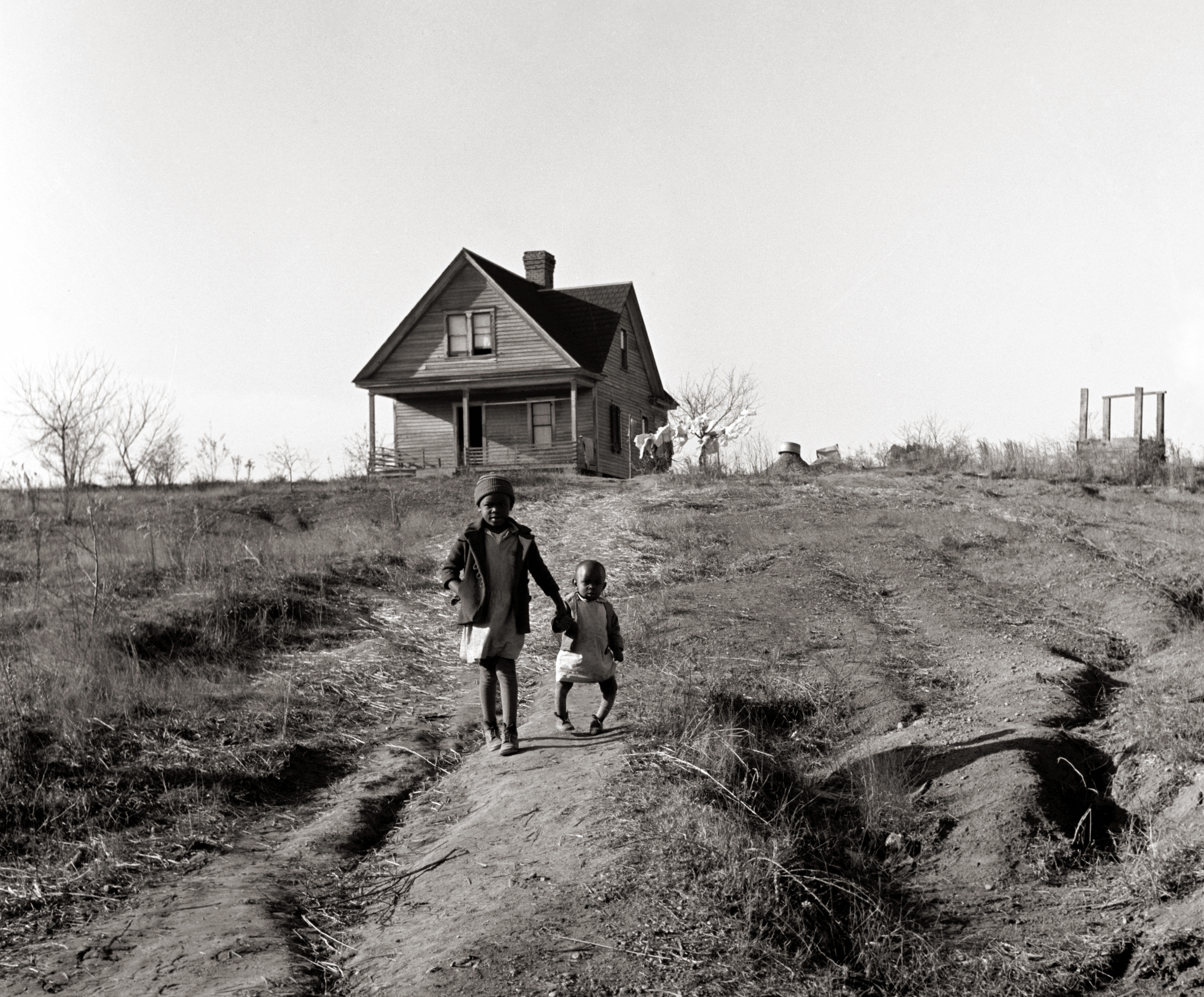
African American children from Wadesboro, North Carolina, 1938.

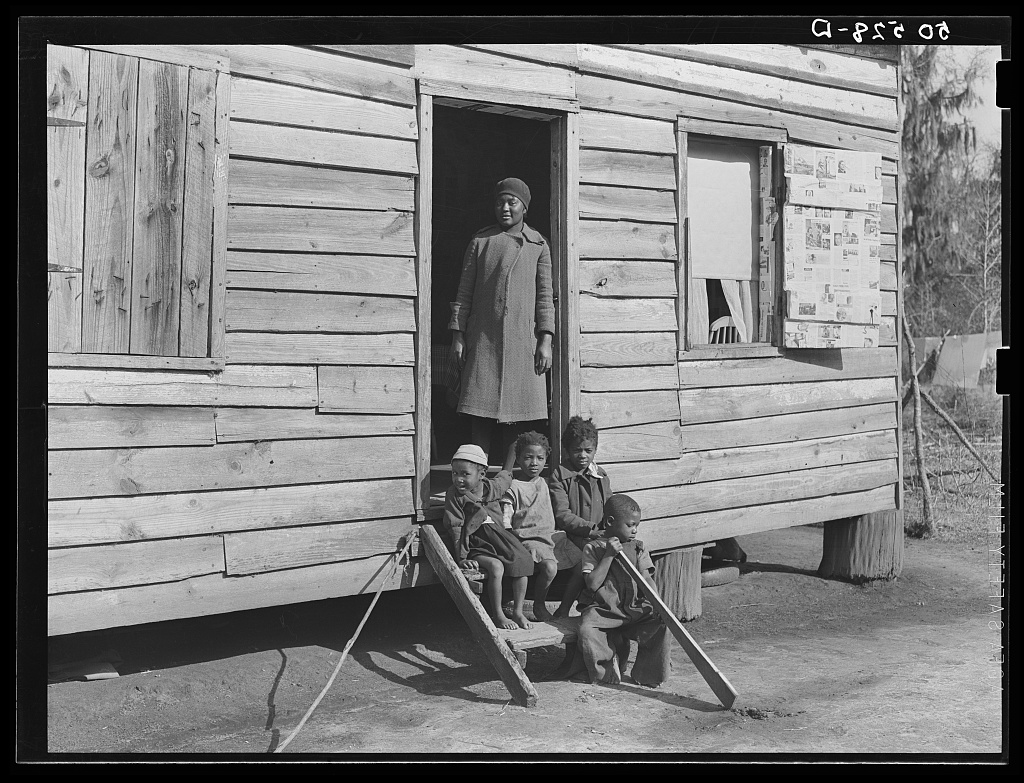
"Negro Home near Charleston, South Carolina", 1938.

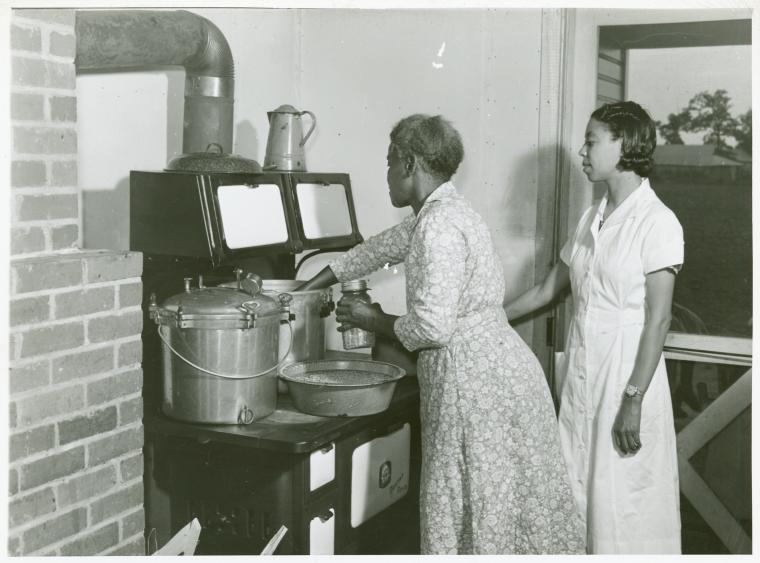
"Ada Turner and Evelyn M. Driver Home Management", 1939.

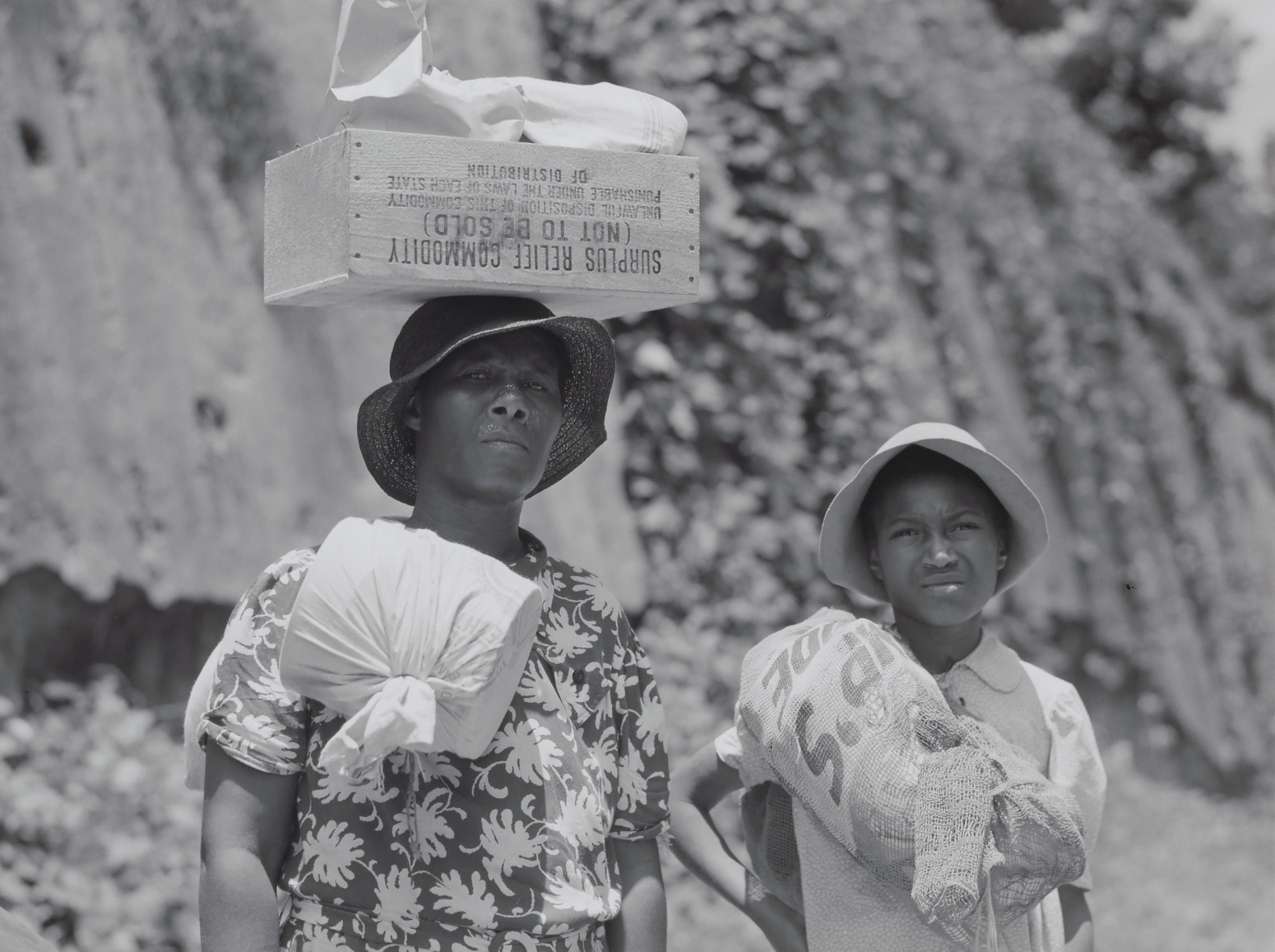
"Two Negro women carrying packages, one has a box of surplus relief commodities on her head. Natchez, Mississippi", 1940

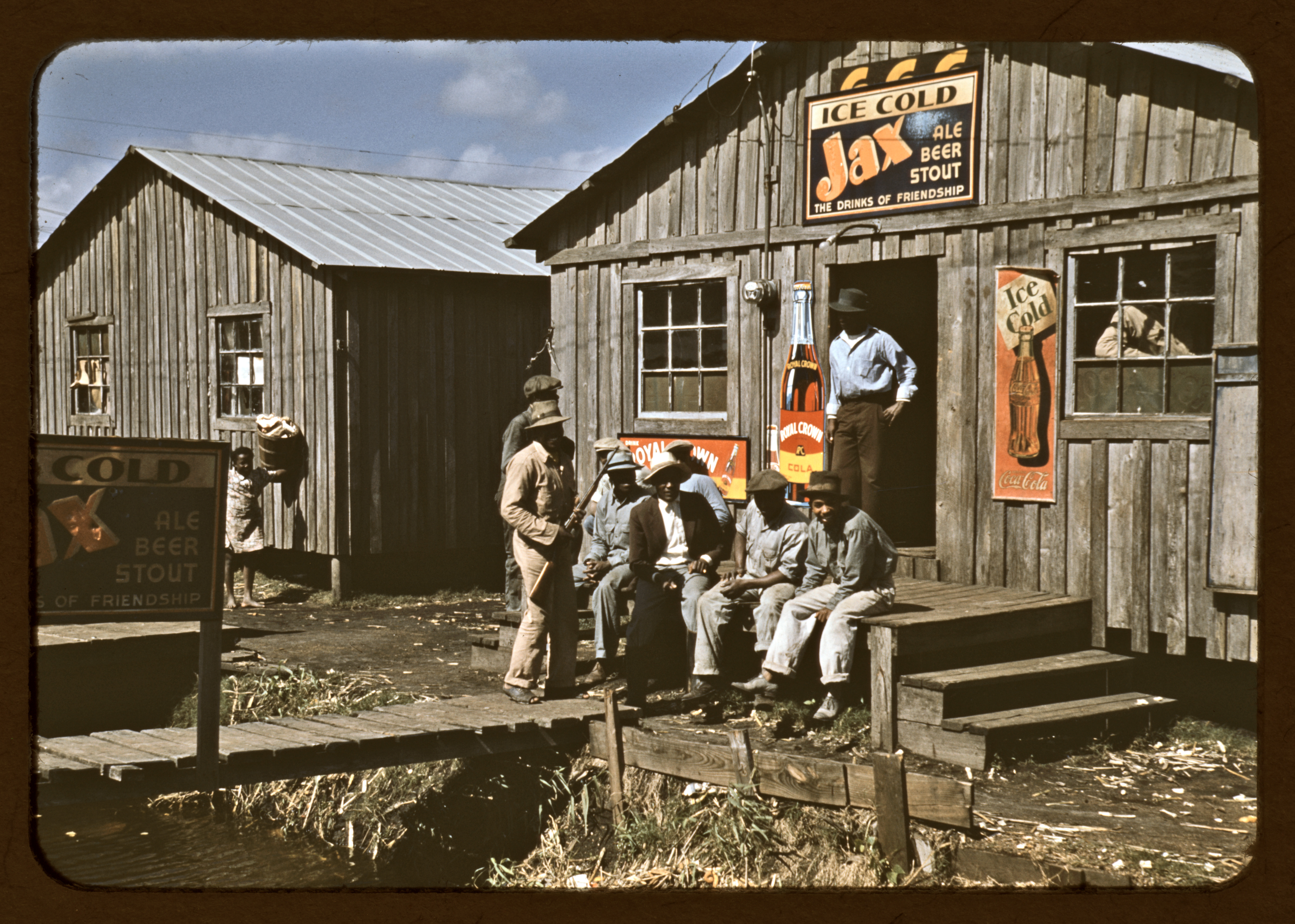
A juke joint located in Belle Glade, Florida, 1944.

== Bibliography ==
- Hendrickson, Paul. Looking for the Light: The Hidden Life and Art of Marion Post Wolcott. New York: Knopf, 1992.
- Hurley, F. Jack. Marion Post Wolcott: A Photographic Journey. Albuquerque: University of New Mexico Press, 1989.
- Wolcott-Moore, Linda, ed. The Photography of Marion Post Wolcott Website created by Wolcott's daughter, hosted on J. David Sapir's site Fixing Shadows, available online: http://people.virginia.edu/~ds8s/mpw/mpw-bio.html, 1999.
- Wolcott, Marion Post. Marion Post Wolcott, FSA Photographs. Carmel, CA: Friends of Photography, 1983.
- Prose, Francine, The Photographs of Marion Post Wolcott. Washington, DC: Library of Congress, 2008, ISBN 978-1904832416

== See also ==
- Dorothea Lange
- Esther Bubley
