= Richard Ross Museum of Art =

Art museum in Delaware, Ohio

Coordinates: 40.2969°N 83.0683°W

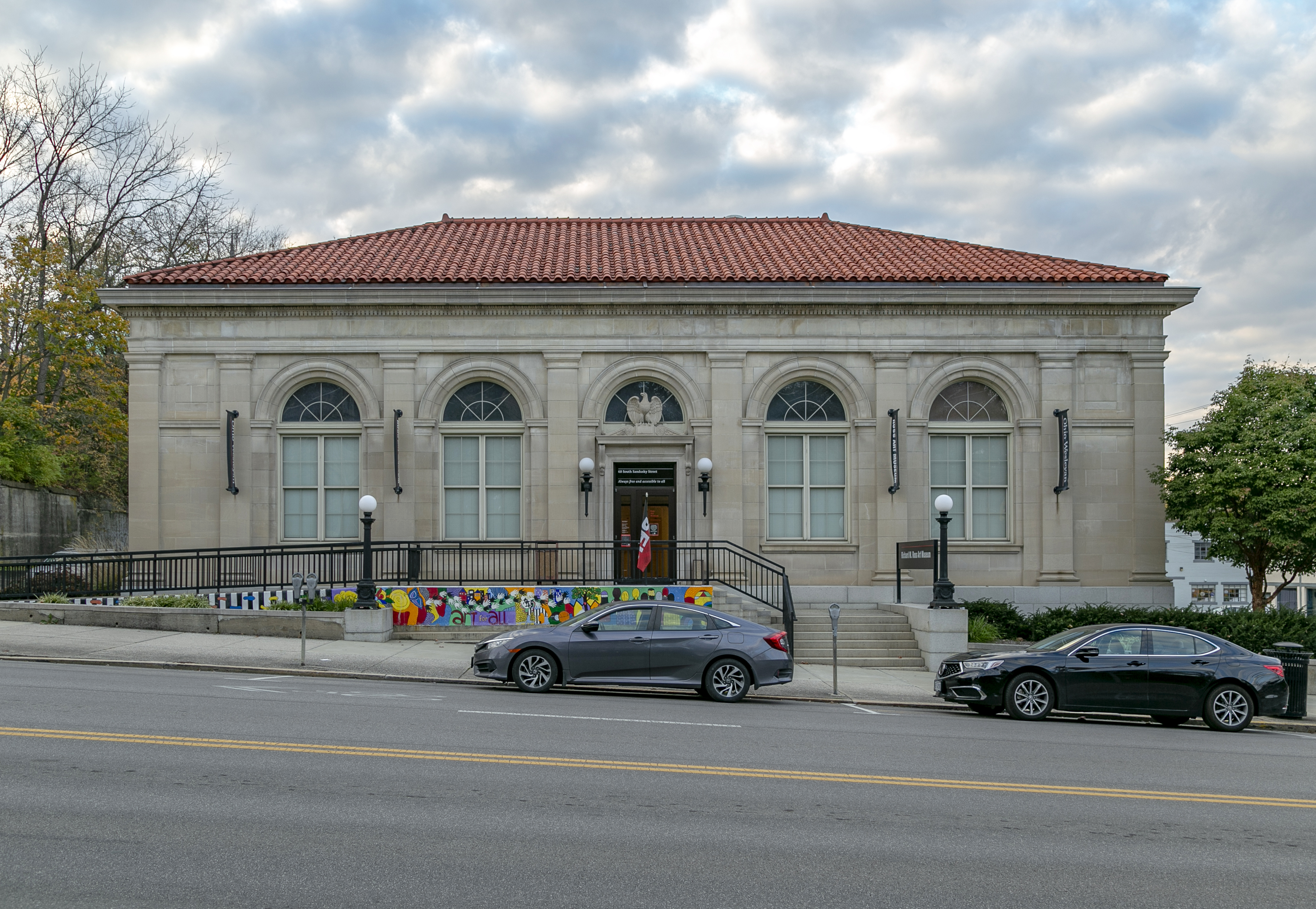
Richard M. Ross Museum of Art

The Richard M. Ross Art Museum is located on Sandusky Street on the campus of Ohio Wesleyan University in Delaware, Ohio, United States. Although the Museum is affiliated with Ohio Wesleyan University it is open to the public during the academic semesters and by appointment during the summer and winter breaks. The Museum was founded in 2002 by Justin Kronewetter, the then director of the Fine Arts Department. The Ross Art Museum maintains a permanent art collection of over 4000 artworks intended for use in exhibitions, teaching, and research. The museum hosts 9-12 rotating shows in its galleries during the school year. The museum boasts four gallery spaces: the Humphreys Gallery (named for Sallie Thompson Humphreys), the Kuhlman Gallery (named for Barbara Kuhlman), the Mayhew Gallery (Named for Lynn A. Mayhew), and the West Gallery.

== Architectural history ==
The building housing the museum was designed in a Beaux Arts style in the early twentieth century. It was acquired by Ohio Wesleyan University in 1969, prior to which it served as the post office for Delaware, Ohio. Built in 1911, the architectural gem boasts terrazzo tile and original hardwood floors, Palladian windows, and a closet-sized safe. Once acquired by the university, the building’s interior space was modified to accommodate several components of the fine arts department. From 1969 to 2000 the building housed the department office, the offices of three faculty members, the slide library, the Lynn Mayhew Art Gallery, and several studios in which both two-dimensional and three-dimensional art courses were taught.

After 31 years of occupancy, at the conclusion of the 2000 spring semester the fine arts department vacated what was Humphreys Art Hall and moved into newly renovated space in both Edgar and Haycock Halls. After an extensive 2 year-long renovation occurred resulting in the establishment of the Richard M. Ross Art Museum. The Collaborative Inc. served as the architectural firm on this project.

Elizabeth Ross provided the lead support for the conversion of the building into the Ross Museum that opened its doors to the public for the first time during the fall of 2002. The official dedication of the museum took place one year later.
