= Roy Stryker =

American photographer (1893 – 1975)

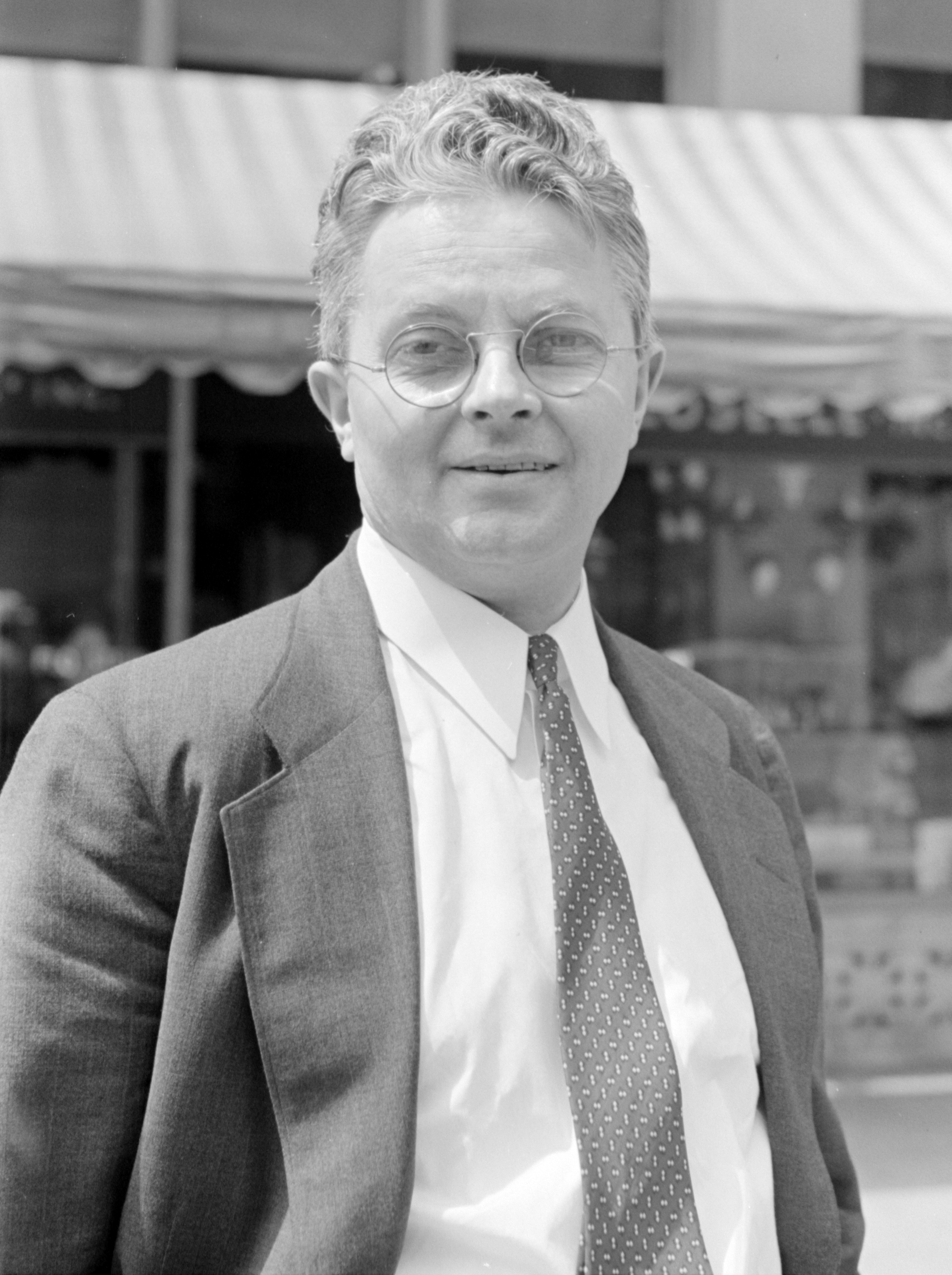
- Stryker photographed by Russell Lee in 1938
- Born: November 5, 1893; Great Bend, Kansas, U.S.
- Died: September 27, 1975 (aged 81); Grand Junction, Colorado, U.S.
- Education: Columbia University
- Occupations: economist, government official, and photographer
- Employer: Farm Security Administration

Roy Emerson Stryker (November 5, 1893 – September 27, 1975) was an American economist, government official, and photographer. He headed the Information Division of the Farm Security Administration (FSA) during the Great Depression, and launched the documentary photography program of the FSA. It hired photographers to travel across the United States and document people in different areas and settings as part of showing the state of people in rural areas in those years. Specific projects were conceived to help assess effects of government programs.

He later worked several years on a documentary project for Standard Oil, established the Pittsburgh Photographic Library (PPL), consulted with other companies, and taught photo-journalism at University of Missouri. In his later years he returned to the West, living at last in Colorado.

== Life ==
After serving in the infantry in World War I, Stryker went to Columbia University, where he studied economics. He used photography to illustrate his economics texts and lectures. At Columbia, he worked with Rexford Tugwell. When Tugwell became part of Franklin D. Roosevelt's Resettlement Administration, Stryker followed him. Tugwell and Stryker refocused the attention of the Resettlement Administration to document the problems of the heartland, and in 1935 Stryker became the head of the Historical Section (Information Division) of the RA. The RA was renamed as the Farm Security Administration, and Stryker set up the photo-documentary project.

Stryker was a manager of the FSA's photographic project. The photographers involved attested to his skill in getting good work from them. He ensured that the photographers were well briefed on their assigned areas before being sent out, and that they were properly funded. However, Stryker has been criticized for his destructive editing, as he would sometimes physically deface negatives by punching holes in them.

"Roy was a little bit dictatorial in his editing and he ruined quite a number of my pictures, which he stopped doing later. He used to punch a hole through a negative. Some of them were incredibly valuable," photographer and artist Ben Shahn has been quoted saying.

Stryker also made sure that mainstream publications had access to FSA photographs. This both helped focus public attention on the plight of the rural poor and set up the commercial careers of his photographers. Overall, from 164,000 developed negatives, some 77,000 different finished photographic prints were made for the press, plus 644 color images.

Photographers hired by Stryker for the FSA included Dorothea Lange, Arthur Rothstein, Walker Evans, Ben Shahn, John Vachon, Marion Post Wolcott, Russell Lee, Jack Delano, Gordon Parks, John Collier, Carl Mydans, and Edwin and Louise Rosskam.

During World War II, the photographic unit of the FSA was reassigned to the Office of War Information. It was used to produce what was essentially propaganda and disbanded after a year. At the same time, the US Congress disbanded the FSA. The holdings of the FSA's photographic unit were transferred to the Library of Congress.

== Standard Oil project ==
Stryker resigned from the government. He worked for Standard Oil in its public relations documentary project from 1943 to 1950, hiring some of the photographers he had worked with at FSA.

In selecting photographers for projects at Standard Oil (SO), Stryker sought those who possessed what he described as an

"insatiable curiosity, the kind that can get to the core of an assignment, the kind that can comprehend what a truck driver, or a farmer, or a driller or a housewife thinks and feels and translate those thoughts and feelings into pictures that can be similarly comprehended by anyone."

Photographers on the SO project included, among others: Berenice Abbott, Gordon Parks and Todd Webb; as well as Esther Bubley, Harold Corsini, Russell Lee, Arnold S. Eagle, Elliott Erwitt and Sol Libsohn, who would later follow Stryker to his next project in Pittsburgh, Pennsylvania. After suggesting topics he wanted to be documented, Stryker gave his photographers the freedom to pursue their individual approaches to their subjects. As with all his projects, Stryker was adamant that his staff understand their subjects and their context before going out on an assignment.

== Later years ==
From 1950 to 1952, Stryker worked to establish the Pittsburgh Photographic Library (PPL). In 1960, the collection was transferred to the Carnegie Library of Pittsburgh.

After leaving the PPL, Stryker directed a documentation project at Jones & Laughlin Steel Corporation. Thereafter, he accepted consulting jobs on occasion and conducted seminars on photo-journalism at the Journalism School of University of Missouri. Stryker eventually returned to the West in the 1960s. He died in Grand Junction, Colorado.

The Roy Stryker Papers, including manuscripts, correspondence, and vintage prints from the Stryker-directed projects: Farm Security Administration (FSA), the Standard Oil (New Jersey) Co. and Jones & Laughlin Steel, are held in Photographic Archives, Archives and Special Collections, University of Louisville.
