= Sol Libsohn =

American photographer (1914–2001)

Sol Libsohn (February 5, 1914 – January 21, 2001) was an American self-taught, documentary photographer.

== Biography ==
After graduating from City College of New York, he joined the Film and Photo League where he earned his living documenting paintings.

In 1936, he co-founded the Photo League in New York City with Sid Grossman. Libsohn was an important teacher at the league as well as a member and leader of numerous production groups.

In addition to freelance work for numerous magazines, he also was employed by Roy Stryker for the documentary project of Standard Oil Company of New Jersey (later Exxon), the Federal Art Project, and Princeton University, where he taught art and photography to disadvantaged youth in the Summer Program.

Libsohn was a personal acquaintance of Romana Javitz, head of the New York Public Library's Picture Collection from 1929 to 1968, who sought out his work for the library.

== Death ==
Libsohn died on January 21, 2001, in Princeton, New Jersey.

== Exhibitions ==
- The Family of Man, January 24 – May 8, 1955, Museum of Modern Art, New York City
- Image of Freedom, October 29, 1941 – February 1, 1942, Museum of Modern Art, New York City

== Collections ==
- Harvard Art Museums
- International Center for Photography
- Museum of Modern Art
- New York Public Library
