= Martin Elkort =

American photographer, illustrator and writer

Martin Edward Elkort
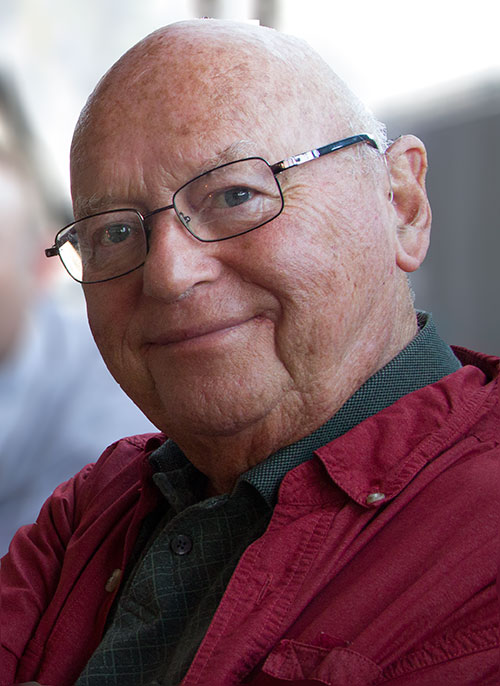
- Born: April 18, 1929; The Bronx, New York, U.S.
- Died: November 19, 2016 (aged 87)
- Occupations: Photographer; Author
- Known for: Street photography
- Spouse: Edythe Spiel Elkort
- Website: martinelkort.com

Martin Edward Elkort (April 18, 1929 – November 19, 2016) was an American photographer, illustrator and writer known primarily for his street photography. Prints of his work are held and displayed by several prominent art museums in the United States. His photographs have regularly appeared in galleries and major publications. Early black and white photographs by Elkort feature the fabled Lower East Side in Manhattan, New York City, showing its ethnic diversity, myriad streets and cluttered alleys. The Coney Island amusement park in Brooklyn was another favorite site during that period. His later work depicts street scenes from downtown Los Angeles and Tijuana, Mexico. Throughout Martin Elkort's long career as a photographer, he always showed the positive, joyful side of life in his candid images.

== Early life and education ==
Born in the Bronx, New York City, in a Jewish family originally from Slovakia, the son of Lewis Elkort and Esther Kronenberg, and the grandson of Herman Elkort who was born as Ilkovics, Martin Elkort grew up during the Great Depression. At the age of 15, he contracted polio and spent four months in the hospital. When he returned home, his parents gave him his first Ciroflex, a twin-lens reflex camera, that cost them about a week's salary.

== Photographic career ==
Elkort took his first professional photograph at the age of 10 while on a car trip with his parents to Baltimore. During the trip, he took photographs of flooded streets. The Baltimore Sun purchased his photographs of flood scenes and featured one of them on its front page. After his recovery from polio, he set out around Manhattan taking pictures of whatever interested him.

Elkort was a member of New York Photo League from 1948 to 1951; an editorial associate and contributor to New Mexico Magazine in 1957; a founding member in 2002 of Los Angeles League of Photographers (LALOP); a contributing editor and contributed photographs to Rangefinder Magazine in 2006; and a member of the Photography Arts Council at Los Angeles County Museum of Art.

=== Early period: New York ===
While studying at New York City's Cooper Union School of Art, Elkort joined the New York Photo League, an organization of photographers that served as the epicenter of the documentary movement in American photography. There he studied under successful photographers including Paul Strand, Aaron Siskind, Sid Grossman, Lou Stoumen, Imogen Cunningham and Weegee, learning to become adept at what he refers to as "stealth photography". With a more refined Rolleiflex twin-lens reflex camera strapped around his neck, he would roam the streets peering down into the 2×2 inch ground glass. He developed the skill of walking right up to a person and taking their photo without them even realizing it. His goal was to capture this post-war period's general optimism and innocence. During this period he worked at the Wildenstein & Company Gallery and later, the Stephen Michael Studio in Manhattan where he further enhanced his photographic knowledge and technique.

In 1948, Elkort showed his pictures of Hasidic Jewish boys playing in the streets to Edward Steichen, who was curator of photography at New York's Museum of Modern Art and probably America's most famous photographer at the time. Steichen rejected his photos, describing Martin's skills as "no better than the other 35 million amateur photographers in the country." Dejected but determined, Elkort worked tirelessly to improve his craft and two years later, he met with Steichen again. This time the famous curator bought three of his images for the museum's collection: "Soda Fountain Girl", "Puppy Love", and "The Girl With Black Cat", all uplifting images of children at Coney Island.

Elkort's photographs (c. 1951) of recently liberated Jewish immigrants learning new work skills at the Bramson ORT (Organization for Rehabilitation and Training) School in Brooklyn. They offered rare and intimate glimpses into their struggle to integrate into a new society after World War II. Some of his pictures show Jewish workers bearing tattoos evidencing their incarceration in Nazi concentration camps during The Holocaust. In 1951, more than 20,000 Jews received vocational training at the Bramson ORT School. Seamstresses, tailors, pattern makers, pressers; here they learned a trade that was much needed in New York's growing fashion and garment district. In 2008, Elkort donated 33 of his vintage ORT photographs to the United States Holocaust Memorial Museum in Washington, D.C.

=== Later period: Los Angeles ===
After receiving a digital camera for his 70th birthday, Martin's photographic career re-ignited. He began to show his current and older work in galleries around the country. He also found a renewed interest in the New York Photo League.

In 2002, he co-founded the Los Angeles League of Photographers along with David Schulman and David Stork. Modeled after the New York Photo League, its mission is to expose the wider public to photography's essential social, political and aesthetic values. He also writes articles for magazines dealing with photography including Rangefinder and Black & White Magazine.

As of March 2014, Elkort's work is widely exhibited and can be found in the permanent collections of the United States Holocaust Memorial Museum in Washington, D.C.; the Museum of Modern Art in New York City; The Jewish Museum (Manhattan) in New York City; the Columbus Museum of Art; The Museum of Fine Arts, Houston; The J. Paul Getty Museum in Los Angeles; as well as many corporate and private collections.

== Author ==
Following his retirement from the travel industry in 1996, Elkort authored two books, Getting from Fired to Hired and The Secret Life of Food. He also wrote numerous magazine articles for Rangefinder and Black & White magazines.

== Personal life ==
In the 1970s, Martin and his wife Edythe bought and ran a travel agency in Beverly Hills, California, catering to a clientele that included many Hollywood stars.

In 1976, Martin and his longtime friend Murray Vidockler founded the Society for Accessible Travel & Hospitality (SATH) to promote better wheelchair access on buses and at airports, hotels and major destinations.

== Publications ==
=== Publications by Elkort ===
- The Secret Life of Food: A Feast of Food and Drink History. Folklore, and Fact. J.P. Tarcher. 1991. ISBN 978-0874776621.
- Getting from Fired to Hired: Bounce Back from Losing Your Job and Get Your Career Back on Track!. Petersons Guides. 1997. ISBN 978-0028617374.
- Children: Behind The Lens: Street Photography Capturing the Essence of Childhood. Self published. 2015. ISBN 978-0692-53310-9.

=== Publications with contributions by Elkort ===
- Higonnet, Anne and Lafo, Rachel, "Presumed Innocence – Photographic Perspectives of Children". DeCordova Museum, 2008
- Klein, Mason and Evans, Catherine, "The Radical Camera: New York's Photo League, 1936–1951". Yale University Press, 2011

== Exhibitions ==
- New York Photo League – Group Shows, 1948–1951
- Life Magazine Contest for Young Photographers – Finalist, 1952
- Museum of New Mexico, Santa Fe, NM – Photographer's Annual Shows, 1956 & 1958
- Artseal Gallery, San Francisco, CA – Group Shows, 2001, 2005
- Alpert Jewish Community Center, Long Beach, CA – One Man Show, 2001
- Fototeka Gallery, Los Angeles, CA – One Man Show, 2002
- Photo Impact, Hollywood, CA. – One Man Show, 2003
- John Cleary Gallery, Houston, TX – Two Man Show, 2003
- Millard Sheets Gallery, Pomona, CA – Group Show, 2005
- Metro Gallery, Los Angeles, CA – Group Show, 2006
- BLMan Gallery, Los Angeles, CA – One Man Show, 2006
- Barry Singer Gallery, Petaluma, CA – One Man Show, 2006
- The Jewish Museum, New York City, NY – Permanent Collection, 2008 acquisition
- The Jewish Museum – The Radical Camera: New York's Photo League, 1936–1951, November 2011 – March 2012
- Catherine Couturier Gallery, Houston, TX – One Man Show, 2014

== Collections ==
Elkort's work is held in the following collections:

- Briscoe Center for American History at The University of Texas at Austin - Austin, TX - 2021 acquisition
- The Los Angeles Public Library - Los Angeles, CA - 2021 acquisition
- The Columbus Museum of Art - Columbus, OH - 2021 acquisition
- The Norton Museum - Palm Beach, FL - 2021 acquisition
- The Jewish Museum - New York, NY - 2020 acquisition
- The Museum of the City of New York - 2020 acquisition
- Museum of Modern Art, New York City, NY – 1950 acquisition
- Columbus Museum of Art, Columbus, OH – c. 2000 acquisition
- The Museum of Fine Arts, Houston, TX – 2002 acquisition
- The J. Paul Getty Museum, Los Angeles, CA – 2004 acquisition
- O'Melveny & Myers – Corporate Collection, 2006 acquisition
- United States Holocaust Memorial Museum, Washington, D.C. – 2008 acquisition
