= N. Jay Jaffee =

Jewish American photographer

N. Jay Jaffee (1921–1999), also known as Nathan Jaffee and Nat Jaffee, was a New York photographer who captured the lives of ordinary (and on occasion well-known) people, city streets and country landscapes, political movements, and private moments.

== Life ==
N. Jay Jaffee was born in Brooklyn in 1921. He was the youngest son of Jewish immigrants Isadore and Anna Jaffee. After graduating junior high school at age 15, he briefly attended the New York School of Printing and trained as a typesetter. During World War II, he served as an infantry squad leader with the 104th Timberwolf Division and fought in Holland, Germany, and France. He married in 1945, had two children, and worked as a salesman in the printing industry. After living in Queens for some years, he divorced and moved to Huntington, Long Island. He died in 1999.

== Photography ==
In the 1940s and 1950s, Jaffee began photographing the Brooklyn neighborhoods in which he grew up, and soon expanded into New York's other boroughs. His formal training came after he had been photographing for some time. He attended classes taught by Sid Grossman, of the Photo League, and met with Edward Steichen, then curator of photography at the Museum of Modern Art. In 1950, two of his photographs were included in the MOMA group show “Fifty-One American Photographers."

Throughout the 1960s and 1970s, Jaffee continued documenting street life in New York and throughout the U.S., as well as in Canada and Europe. Several of his subjects documented social justice issues, including the anti-war and civil rights movements of the 1960s, including political demonstrations, rallies, and concerts. He created portraits of Yoko Ono, Pete Seeger, Isaac Bashevis Singer, Sid Grossman, Dan Weiner, and Felrath Hines. Jaffee’s later work focused on images of the land and sea, both dramatic and serene.

In the introduction to the exhibition catalog of Coney Island to Caumsett: The Photographic Journey of N. Jay Jaffee, a 50-year retrospective of his work at the Heckscher Museum in Huntington, New York, curator Janie Welker describes Jaffee's work:

He saw and recorded human activity: a lonely, windswept boardwalk; a whimsical sculpture; men sunning themselves amidst the city grime; the crisp balance of lines and light in a sparkling cityscape; a teddy bear on a clothesline. His photographs not only record the instant, they communicate the substance. The images are exquisite, enduring expositions of lights and shadow, visual textures in balanced tension. They are also filled with wit and humor, and a profound understanding of the ironies in all of our lives.

Jaffee's work was presented solo exhibitions over the years. In 1981, a solo show, Inward Image: Photographs of N. Jay Jaffee, was held at the Brooklyn Museum. In 1999, a major retrospective at the Heckscher Museum of Art, Coney Island to Caumsett: The Photographic Journey of N. Jay Jaffee, 1947–1997, celebrated his 50 years in photography. In 2014, "N. Jay Jaffee Photographs: From Public to Personal" was presented at the University of Maryland in 2014.

His photographs have appeared in books, magazines and even films such as, Kishke King, which appeared in the documentary "Deli Man" by Erik Anjou.

== Collections ==
Jaffee’s photographs are in the collections of major museums and institutions, including the Museum of Modern Art, Metropolitan Museum of Art, the Smithsonian American Art Museum, National Portrait Gallery, Library of Congress, New York Public Library, Bibliothèque nationale de France, George Eastman House, and the Museum of Fine Arts Boston.

== Publications ==
- Jaffee, N. Jay. N. Jay Jaffee: Photographs 1947–1956. Henley Press, 1976.
