= Lee Sievan =

American photographer

- Born: Lina Gertrude Culik; 1907; New York City
- Died: 1990 (aged 82–83); New York City

Lee Sievan (1907–1990) was an American photographer. Initially self-taught as a photographer, she later took classes at the New School for Social Research and the American Artists School. Sievan was a member of the New York Photo League.

== Early life and education ==
Sievan was born in 1907 to Polish immigrants, and grew up in New York City on the Lower East Side neighborhood. She attended Hunter College, graduating in 1929. She then attended Hunter Teachers College where she concentrated her studies in physics and mathematics.

In 1938, she attended her first photography course with Eliot Elisofon at the American Artists School. Following that, at the New School for Social Research where she worked with Berenice Abbott, and became Weegee's part-time darkroom assistant.

== Work ==
Sievan supported her husband, Maurice Sievan, a painter, for over four decades starting in 1934, by working at Hunter College biological sciences department. She went on in 1978 to take a job at the International Center of Photography, as an archivist and librarian.

== Collections ==
Her work is included in the collections of the Smithsonian American Art Museum, the Metropolitan Museum of Art, the National Portrait Gallery, Washington and the International Center of Photography,
