= Arthur Leipzig =

American photographer (1918–2014)

Arthur Leipzig (October 25, 1918 – December 5, 2014) was an American photographer who specialized in street photography and was known for his photographs of New York City. In 2004, he won the Lucie Award for Outstanding Achievement in Fine Art Photography.

== Career ==
Leipzig was born in Brooklyn. After sustaining a serious injury to his right hand while working at a glass wholesaler, Leipzig joined the Photo League where he studied photography, took part in Sid Grossman's Documentary Workshop, taught Advanced Technique classes for three years, and exhibited his work. From 1942 until 1946 he was a staff photographer for PM. He also studied under Paul Strand before quitting the League to pursue a career as a freelance photojournalist.

In 1955 Leipzig's 1943 photograph King of the Hill, depicting two little boys challenging each other on a sand heap, was selected by Edward Steichen for the world-touring exhibition The Family of Man at the Museum of Modern Art in New York, that was seen by 9 million visitors.

Leipzig was a professor of art and the director of photography at the CW Post Campus of Long Island University from 1968 to 1991. In an effort to build his department and enhance the quality of photographic techniques, Leipzig recruited two well known photojournalists, Louis Stettner and Ken Johnson (formerly a photo editor with Black Star) to his staff. He also recruited the now, highly regarded female photographer, Christine Osinski.

Leipzig contributed his work to many publications including Fortune, Look, Parade, and Natural History, while continuing to pursue his independent projects.

Leipzig died in Sea Cliff, New York on December 5, 2014, aged 96.

== Exhibitions ==
=== Solo exhibitions ===
- 2005 Albin O. Kuhn Library Gallery, UMBC, Baltimore
- 2005–2006 On Assignment, Columbus Museum of Art, Columbus, Mississippi
- 2007 On Assignment: A Retrospective, Photographic Gallery, New York
- 2008 Arthur Leipzig: Next Stop New York, Suermondt-Ludwig-Museum, Aachen.
- 2009 Arthur Leipzig: Next Stop New York, Städtische Galerie Iserlohn, Iserlohn

=== Group exhibitions ===
- 2003 Looking for Leisure, Staley + Wise Gallery, New York
- 2005 Winter Selections, Gendell Gallery, San Francisco
- 2006 Right of Passage: Youth Culture from the Mid-Century, Howard Greenberg Gallery, New York
- 2007 New York, NY, Fifty One Fine Art Photography, Antwerp
- 2009 Sexy and the City – New York Photographs, Yossi Milo Gallery, New York
- 2009 Greenberg in Hamburg, Flo Peters Gallery, Hamburg
- 2010 Family of Man, Howard Greenberg Gallery, New York
- 2011–2012 The Radical Camera: New York's Photo League, 1936-1951], The Jewish Museum, New York

== Collections ==
Leipzig's work is held in the following permanent collections:

- Bibliothèque nationale de France, Paris,
- Brooklyn Museum
- National Portrait Gallery, Washington, D.C.

== Publications ==
- Sarah's Daughters: A Celebration of Jewish Women. Women's American ORT, 1988.
- Growing up in New York. Boston: David R. Godine, 1995. ISBN 1567920519.
- On Assignment with Arthur Leipzig. Boston: Long Island University Press, 2005. ISBN 978-0-913252-02-4.
- Arthur Leipzig: Next Stop New York. Munich / New York: Prestel, 2008.

== Awards ==
- 2004 Lucie Award for Outstanding Achievement in Fine Art Photography
