= Nathan Ausubel =

American historian, folklorist and humorist (1898–1986)

Nathan Ausubel (June 15, 1898 – 23 November 1986) was an American historian, folklorist and humorist. He specialized in Jewish culture.

== Biography ==
Ausubel was born in Leżajsk, Galicia, the sixth of eight children in a Jewish family, and immigrated as a child with his family to Brooklyn, New York City in 1902. He later attended Columbia University. Ausubel enlisted in the Jewish Legion's 39th Battalion during World War I and fought in the Jordan Valley.

He was married briefly to Manya Schrager, and then Marynn Ausubel till her death in 1980; they had one daughter, Ethel Ausubel Frimmet. His nephew David P. Ausubel became a noted professor, educator, ethnographer, and a pioneer in cognitive educational psychology.

== Bibliography ==
Ausubel is best known for his two books, A Treasury of Jewish Folklore, which went through over twenty editions, and Pictorial History Of The Jewish People. This included detailed descriptions of previously unknown Lost Tribes of Israel, as well as information on the Khazars.

A partial bibliography follows:

- Superman: The Life of Frederick the Great, I. Washburn, 1931.
- A Treasury Of Jewish Folklore: The Stories, Traditions, Legends, Humor, Wisdom and Folk Songs of the Jewish People (originally published 1948), Crown Publishers, 1989 ISBN 0-517-50293-3
- Jewish Culture in America: Weapon for Jewish Survival and Progress, New Century Publishers, 1948.
- Pictorial History Of The Jewish People, From Bible Times To Our Own Day Throughout The World (originally published 1953), Crown Publishers, 1984. ISBN 0-517-55283-3
- The Book of Jewish Knowledge: An encyclopedia of Judaism and the Jewish people, covering all elements of Jewish life from Biblical times to the present, Crown Publishers, 1964. ISBN 0-517-09746-X
- A Treasury of Jewish Poetry, 1970.
- A Treasury of Jewish Humor, (originally published 1951), M. Evans and Company, 1988. ISBN 0-87131-546-7

Ausubel translated several works of Yiddish literature, most notably Mother, by Sholom Asch. He also co-edited the annual series Voices of History.
