= Sonia Handelman Meyer =

Polish-American photographer (1920–2022)

- Born: Cecil Joan Weiner; February 12, 1920; Lakewood Township, New Jersey
- Died: September 11, 2022 (aged 102); Charlotte, North Carolina
- Occupation: Photographer
- Children: 2

Sonia Handelman Meyer (February 12, 1920 – September 11, 2022) was an American photographer, best known for her street photography as a member of the New York Photo League.

== Early life and education ==
Meyer was born in Lakewood Township, New Jersey, in 1920 to Harry and Francesca Handelman, who were Jewish immigrants from Eastern Europe. She studied English at Queens College and was a part of the school's first graduating class in 1941.

== Life and work ==
Meyer discovered photography in 1942 while she was a civilian worker at Fort Buchanan, Puerto Rico, for the U.S. Army Signal Corps.

Returning to New York in the 1940s, she was a member of the New York Photo League from 1943 to 1951, as a both photographer and secretary. She studied under Sid Grossman at the Photo League. Following World War II, she photographed Jewish Holocaust survivors in New York. She participated in the 1949 exhibition This is the Photo League.

After the dissolution of the Photo League in 1951, Meyer's work went largely unrecognized until 2006 when it was rediscovered by a gallery owner in Charlotte, North Carolina.

In 2014 the Mint Museum in Charlotte presented the exhibition Bearing Witness: The New York Photo League and Sonia Handelman Meyer. In 2019 she was included in the exhibition Modern Women: Modern Vision, Works from the Bank of America Collection at the Tampa Museum of Art.

Meyer died in Charlotte, North Carolina, on September 11, 2022, at the age of 102.

== Collections ==
Meyer's work is held in the following permanent collections:

- Metropolitan Museum of Art, New York: 1 print (as of December 2019)
- Jewish Museum, New York: 3 prints (as of December 2019)
- Mint Museum, Charlotte, North Carolina
