= Larry Silver =

American photographer (born 1934)

Larry Silver (born 1934) is an American photographer. He was born in the Bronx. While a student at the High School of Industrial Art in Manhattan he met members of the Photo League, among them Lou Bernstein, W. Eugene Smith and Weegee. He won a first prize in the Scholastic-Ansco Photography Awards, and a scholarship to the Art Center School in Los Angeles. Silver takes black-and-white photographs, mainly documenting the places he has lived: Santa Monica Beach, California; New York City; and Westport, Connecticut.

Silver's work is in various museum collections including those of the Metropolitan Museum of Art, the Brooklyn Museum, the George Eastman House, the Whitney Museum of American Art, the Boston Museum of Fine Arts, and the Minneapolis Institute of Arts. His work has been shown in many solo and group exhibitions.
