= Sy Kattelson =

American photographer

Seymour Kattelson (February 11, 1923 – November 24, 2018), better known as Sy Kattelson, was an American photographer whose earliest work documents working class New Yorkers during the years immediately following World War II. He was an early practitioner of street photography and was associated with the Photo League from 1947 until its closing in 1951. His portraits, frequently taken without his subjects' awareness while traveling through the streets or riding the city's subways, convey the dignity of their lives as lived in public places. The depth of his photographs often comes from the tension between the grittiness of their urban settings and the contemplative sense of his subjects' as being lost within themselves. He died in Rhinebeck, New York in November 2018 at the age of 95.

== Early career ==
Kattelson was born in 1923 in the Bronx, New York to a middle class Jewish family. His mother owned a lingerie shop and his father was an electrician and fabricator of neon signs. His paternal grandfather was a vaudeville musician whose lifestyle influenced Kattelson's decision to become an artist. Until he was 7 years old they lived in Mount Eden area of the Grand Concourse and then moved to a house in Laurelton, Queens. In 1936 they lost the family store and returned to the Bronx, eventually settling in what was then the working-class neighborhood of Manhattan's Washington Heights. He attended Stuyvesant High School, intending on becoming an aeronautical engineer, but abandoned this direction on learning that there were few jobs being given to Jews at the time in engineering.

It was while working as a delivery boy for the Aremac Camera store on 43rd street that he first became aware of the possibility of working professionally as a photographer. A German refugee couple who were the owners of a studio to which he was making a delivery on sensing his interest in their work encouraged him to pursue photography. "They told me I should do something interesting with my life - like photography". He later worked in the dark room at Stone-Wright Studio and then became the assistant to one of their in-house photographers. This was followed by his becoming the photographer at Lawrence Studios- where he photographed scenes staged by illustrators who would then use his work as the basis for their illustrations in magazines such as True Story, Cosmopolitan and Romance.

Rather than wait to be drafted, in 1942 he volunteered for the Air Corps as a corporal aerial cartographer, developing film taken from aircraft to assess the success of their bombing runs. At the war's end he was redeployed to France where he worked as an army publicity photographer.

== Photo League ==
Upon his return to the United States, Kattelson joined the Photo League and studied under Sid Grossman and Paul Strand and later was enrolled in the Hans Hofmann School of Art. His work was represented in the original 'This is the Photo League' exhibit of 1948 and the 'New Workers' exhibit of 1949. He taught the Basic Technique and Advanced Technique classes in 1949 and 1950 respectively. He served as an executive member and teacher at the Photo League until it disbanded in 1951 during the Red Scare after being declared "subversive" and a front for the Communist Party. The League, while not directly allied with the Communist Party, was originally named the Workers Film and Photo League and had its origins in Europe as the "Workers as Photographers" movement and counted among its members many that were socially and politically progressive. As Kattelson stated, "We were trying to do the sort of photography that put real people in the pictures. Somehow, that was considered radical." The group's political leanings were never his concern. “I was just trying to show the world what it was.” After the disbanding of the League, Kattelson remained close to Grossman and co-edited and printed carbros for Grossman's posthumous 1959 book Journey to the Cape.

== Later career ==
From 1953 to 1955 Kattelson worked as a fashion photographer for Glamour and for Fashion and Travel where his experience in street photography led him to be one of the first to use a 35mm camera to photograph models in outdoor urban settings. The social concerns of the Photo League influenced his relationship to fashion photography. “We were photojournalists. If I did a fashion spread for a magazine and I happened to catch some black people in the background of a picture, they would blot that out before the magazine was released. I suppose the idea was to make believe blacks didn't exist and we, the people in the League, really believed in what we were doing. Photos really meant something to us.”

In 1954 Kattelson photographed the first Newport Jazz Festival. In 1958 he became a color darkroom technician and manager at a large commercial color photography lab. In 1961 he moved to Woodstock, NY where he founded the Tinker Street Cinema, at the time one of the few art house cinemas outside a major urban area. In the 1980s, he returned to photography, producing photographs that continued the themes of his earlier work while capturing the dynamism of urban life through collage and multiple exposures. He has been represented by the Witkin Gallery and, since 1992, by the Howard Greenberg Gallery in New York.

== Photographs ==
While never purely a formalist, Kattelson's photographs often use the geometry of urban structures or the multiple reflections of storefronts or subway windows to create densely layered settings for his introspective portraits. His later work makes use of triptychs or multiple exposures to capture the sense of dynamism of urban life. The people in his photographs, often witnessed in mid gesture, and sometimes in mournful or strained connection to one another, are treated in an unsentimental manner that conveys both their individual character and their anonymity in the larger city. Vivien Raynor, writing in the New York Times has said, "Mr. Kattelson's weakness - if it can be called that - is his respect for the strangers he photographs... His presence is never felt, but his inquiring yet merciful sensibility is everywhere."

== Carbros ==
During the late-1950s and early-1960s, Kattelson mastered the painstaking and almost forgotten technique of Carbro or Carbon print color processing which makes use of multiple layers of emulsion to create densely saturated, painterly color photographs. The technique, whereby each print is assembled over several days out of individually developed layers of emulsion, dates from the 1870s and by the 1930s had largely fallen out of use with the advent of dye-transfer printing. Kattelson's carbros, made from images taken in NYC and Mexico, were originally printed on gelatin tissues he obtained from among the last stock manufactured by the McGraw Colorgraph Company in California, a subsidiary of the Carnation Milk Company. When McGraw ceased production he eventually was able to find material from a special run made by a company in Germany. Carbro prints, of which very few exist, have the color density of a gouache painting and are a completely stable, archival color process.

== Collections ==
Kattelson's photographs are included in the collections of the Museum of Modern Art, the National Portrait Gallery, The Museum of Fine Arts in Houston Texas, The Art Institute of Chicago, The New York Transit Museum, The Jewish Museum of New York, The Smithsonian National Museum of African American History and Culture, The National Gallery of Canada and The Musee d'Art Moderne, Saint Etienne, France. His 1948 portrait of Asa Philip Randolph, taken during Randolph's civil disobedience campaign to desegregate the nation's armed forces, is featured in the traveling Civil Rights exhibit Let Your Motto Be Resistance.
