= Angela Calomiris =

American photographer

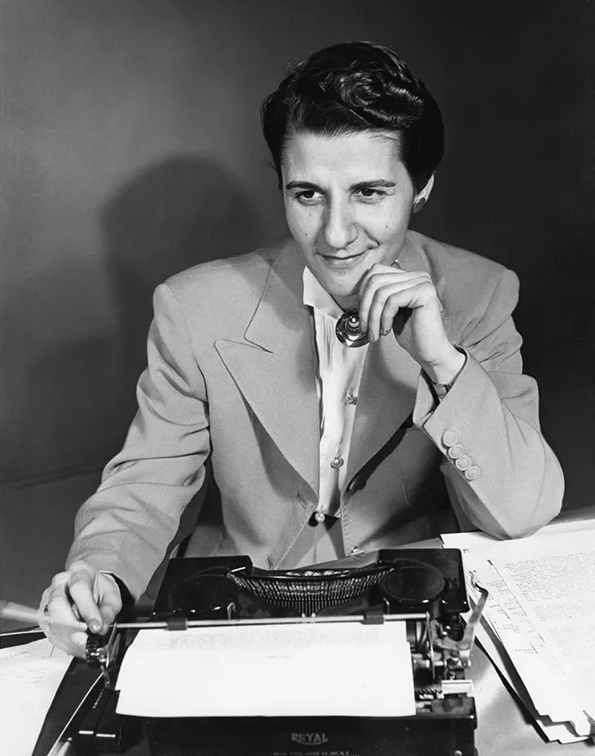
Calomiris c. 1950

Angela Calomiris (August 1, 1916 – January 30, 1995) was an American photographer who became a secret FBI informant within the American Communist Party (CPUSA) under the name Angela Cole. Calomiris spent seven years undercover in the party from February 1942 until April 26, 1949, when she was called to testify in the trial of eleven CPUSA leaders, who were convicted of conspiracy to advocate the overthrow of the US government on October 13, 1949.

== Background ==
The daughter of Greek immigrants, Calomiris was born in New York City on August 1, 1916, and grew up on the Lower East Side of Manhattan. Her father was a furrier, who lost his job during the Great Depression and was forced to support his family through menial labor. Calomiris attended Brooklyn College and Hunter College of the City University of New York for two years, and decided to become a professional photographer, having fallen in love with photography as a child.

== Career ==
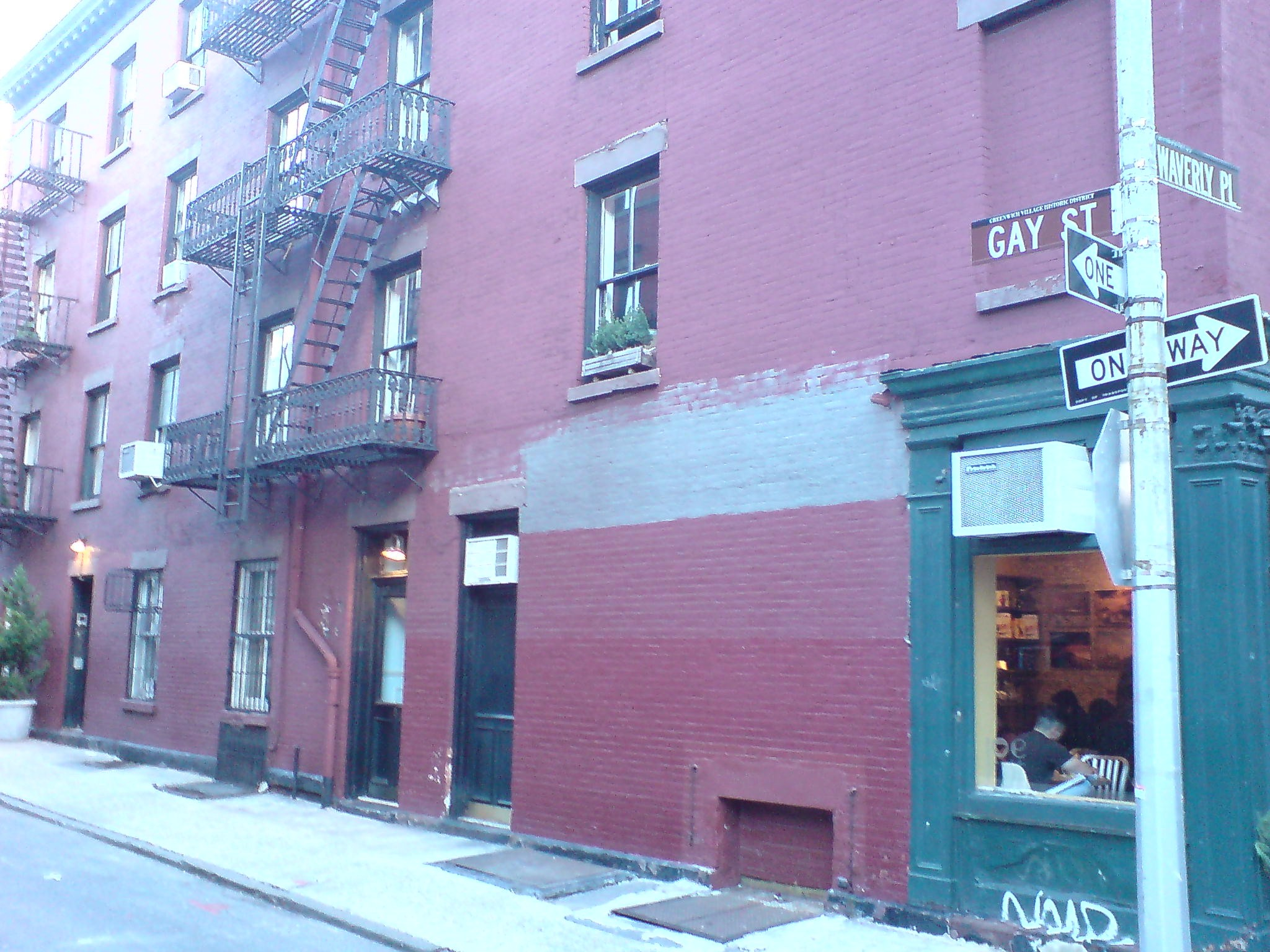
Gay Street in Greenwich Village, Manhattan, where Calomiris lived

After her studies, Calomiris took up residence in Greenwich Village and "instead of buying food, she saved money to buy a camera". She worked for Broadway photographer Hal Phyfe and also joined the Photo League, a group of amateur photographic enthusiasts, which included a number of communists among its members. Sid Grossman, director of the Photo League's school, recruited her; Leona Saron was the Party operative to whom she first reported.

=== FBI Informant ===
In February 1942, Calomiris was approached by two FBI agents, who asked her if she would be willing to infiltrate the CPUSA as an informant. The agents told her that she would receive neither money nor glory for her work, and that she would be disavowed if discovered, possibly putting her in personal danger, but Calomiris accepted their offer anyway after a week of deliberation. In the end she was well paid and earned a respectable pay check despite claims to the contrary. When asked about her decision in 1950, Calomiris told The New York Times that she accepted the offer because she "kind of wanted to be a hero." Her FBI handlers advised her to "never act conspiratorially or try to pry into party secrets", but rather to simply gather and report whatever information came her way.

A few weeks after meeting with the FBI, Calomiris attended a lecture about Soviet efforts in World War II, where she was recruited by communist organizers. She then agreed to join the party, but was advised by her communist recruiters that she should take an assumed name for security reasons and chose the name Angela Cole. Calomiris then rose quickly through the ranks of the party by volunteering for jobs that no one else wanted to do. Over her time in the party, she served as educational director, branch organizer, and co-section organizer of the West Midtown Branch of the CPUSA, before rising to the position of finance secretary. As finance secretary, Calomiris had access to extensive information on party members, including the real names of all members of the branch and the leaders of the national party, and passed all of this information to the FBI. Throughout the time that Calomiris served as an informant, she supported herself as a professional photographer, specializing in animal photographs, but the FBI also paid her a salary (a fact which Calomiris later denied) and covered her expenses, including Communist Party dues.

=== Smith Act trials of Communist Party leaders ===
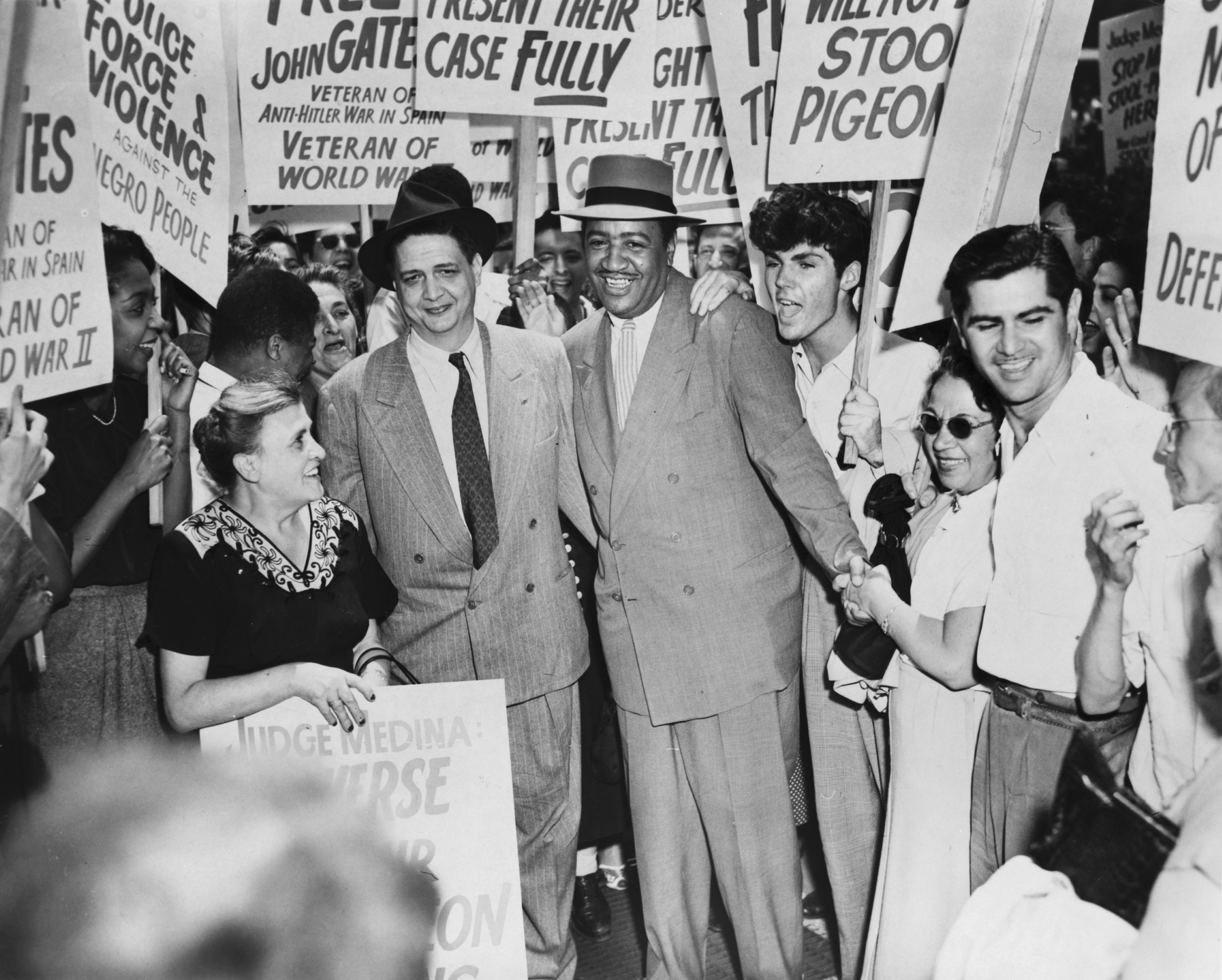
Robert G. Thompson and Benjamin J. Davis, two of the defendants Calomiris identified, leaving the courthouse during the Foley Square trial

During World War II, the US Department of Justice avoided prosecuting American communists, to avoid antagonizing the Soviet Union, then a military ally. After the end of the war, they began compiling a case against the leadership of the CPUSA, using evidence from informants, including Calomiris. John McGohey, the US Attorney for the Southern District of New York, was given the lead role in prosecuting the cases and, under the Smith Act, presented charges against twelve communist leaders on July 20, 1948. The defendants were then indicted by a grand jury and arrested.

After the arrests, Calomiris remained undercover, and continued her activities within the Party. When the trial of the communist leaders began in January, she travelled to Washington, D.C., to join a protest against the prosecutions. She also donated $50 in government money to the legal defense fund for the defendants, and was asked to help plan their legal strategy, but refused. During the trial, the prosecution decided to use Calomiris as a surprise witness and on April 26, she "stunned" the defendants by taking the stand for the prosecution.

In her testimony, Calomiris identified four of the defendants, John Williamson, Benjamin J. Davis, Robert G. Thompson, and Gil Green as members of the Communist Party and provided information on its organization. She also testified that the Party espoused violent revolution against the government and that the Party had attempted to recruit members working in key war industries, on instructions from Moscow. Calomiris was then cross-examined so harshly by the defense, that the presiding judge Harold Medina rebuked the defense attorney, but the questioning "failed to shake her testimony."

Around the time of the trial, Calomiris also began dating Myrtis Johnson, the sister-in-law of her FBI handler, Ken Bierly, a fact that attracted attention from the media.

=== Celebrity after the trial ===
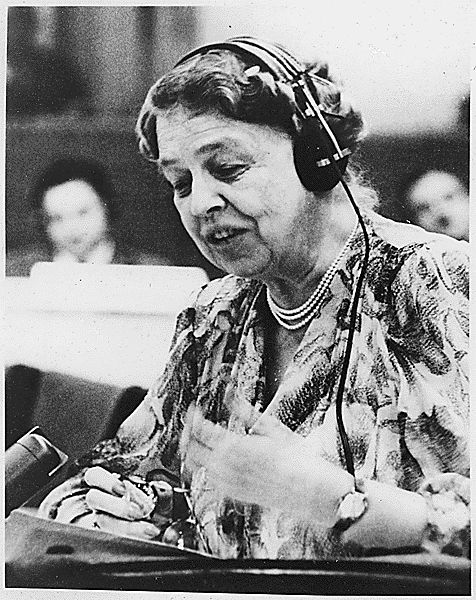
Eleanor Roosevelt (here, speaking at the United Nations in July 1947), invited Calomiris to her radio talk show

The defendants in the Foley Square trial were convicted on October 13, 1949, and Calomiris became a minor celebrity as the result of her role in the proceedings. She capitalized on the fame by writing an autobiography, Red Masquerade: Undercover for the FBI, which was published by Lippincott in 1950. George Scharsburg of the Chicago Daily Tribune wrote that the book was "well worth reading" and A.H. Raskin of The New York Times praised it for being "as interesting for its insight into the problems that best a Government 'plant' in the party as it is for the light it throws on the jealousies, personal intrigues and divisions that exist behind the party's monolithic facade", but Richard Donnelly criticized the book in The Yale Law Journal for being "rather pretentious".

After the publication of her book, Calomiris went on a number of talk radio shows, appearing most notably on former first lady Eleanor Roosevelt's show on NBC, Today with Mrs. Roosevelt, where Roosevelt praised Calomiris as "a young lady of great courage." During the same period, Calomiris continued to work with the FBI, providing information on a communist lesbian policewoman named Yetta Cohn, which resulted in the firing of Cohn and another woman.

=== Later life ===
Calomiris's celebrity status soon began to evaporate, and a number of potential television and movie projects fell through as did offers of a photography job. Around the same time, Calomiris broke up with Myrtis Johnson, and fell out with many of her friends in the New York lesbian community, who disapproved of her decision to give the FBI information on Cohn. Calomiris then left New York, opening a bed and breakfast in Provincetown, Massachusetts, in the 1960s. Arriving at the start of Provincetown's transition from fishing village to seaside resort, Calomiris bought a number of prime properties, including the rooming house at 353 Commercial St. that she named Angels' Landing, which still exists today, memorializing the FBI spy.

== Death ==
Calomiris died on January 30, 1995, in San Miguel de Allende, Mexico.

== Legacy ==
Exhibitions of Calomiris' work include:

- November 4, 2011 - March 25, 2012 "The Radical Camera: New York's Photo League, 1936-1951" at Jewish Museum (New York)
- March 19 - May 9, 2009 "The Women of the Photo League" at Higher Pictures Gallery, New York City

In 2008, Veronica Wilson published "Red Masquerades: Gender and Political Subversion during the Cold War, 1945-1963," as her PhD Dissertation at Rutgers University.

In 2009, SUNY New Paltz theater professor John Wade wrote a play Red Masquerade, directed by Stephen Kitsakos.
