= Vivian Cherry =

American photographer (1920–2019)

Vivian Cherry (July 27, 1920 – March 4, 2019) was an American photographer best known for her street photography. She was a member of the New York Photo League.

== Early life ==
Vivian Cherry was born in Manhattan on July 27, 1920, and grew up in the Bronx, New York. Her parents, Sasha and Ida (Agranovitch) Cherry, were Russian Jewish immigrants. After arriving in the United States, her father anglicized his name to Sam worked as a house painter, while her mother was a homemaker.

Cherry's earliest ambition was to become a dancer. She studied dance at the Denishawn School in the Bronx before attending Walton High School.

== Career ==
After a short stint at the University of Wisconsin, Madison, Cherry began dancing professionally. She performed with the Helen Tamiris Dance Company; in nightclubs like La Conga and Le Bal Tabarin; in the Lunch Hour Follies, a wartime entertainment put on by the American Theater Wing; and the Broadway musical Sadie Thompson.

When a knee injury put her dance career on hold, Cherry found work at a photography lab for the news service Underwood & Underwood. As she mastered the technical elements of the darkroom, she became more and more curious about the photographers who took the images she processed. She bought a Graflex camera and went out to take pictures of her own. Cherry returned to Broadway once more, to dance in the 1945 revival of Showboat, but when that musical closed she decided to pursue a career in photography full time.

Vivian Cherry joined the Photo League cooperative in 1946. She met the photographer and teacher Sid Grossman through the League; he would become her mentor. In the 1940s and 1950s, she licensed photographs to magazines like Collier's, Life, Look, Ebony, and Popular Photography. She documented ordinary people amid the swirl of city life; one of her best-known photo series is of commuters traveling to and from work on the Third Avenue El. That series is bookended by a later one showing men at work dismantling that train line in 1955.

Cherry also traveled outside of New York City for her photo essays, including a pair that focused on issues of healthcare among the Navajo and Pueblo nations and among West Virginia coal miners. Her photography was inspired by the documentary work of Dorothea Lange, Helen Levitt, and Paul Strand.

Like Helen Levitt, she frequently photographed children at play on the streets of New York City. One of these photographs, Playing Lynched, East Harlem, New York (1947), was taken when Cherry witnessed a group of children playing a game that reenacted, in pantomime, the scene of a lynching. The image illustrates the pervasive effects of racial terror in the United States, a theme that was of great concern to the leftist Cherry and her colleagues at the Photo League. Its composition references the photo postcards of lynchings that circulated in the United States at that time, creating a disturbing contrast with the actual subject of the photograph, a Black child playing a game. Although it is now one of her most prominent works, at the time Cherry could not immediately find a publisher for this photograph and others from the same series – when she submitted them to McCall's, the magazine rejected them. In 1948, her larger series "Game of Guns" looking at violence and children's play was published in the French magazine Regards; it wasn't published in the US until 1952.

Vivian Cherry took a long hiatus from photography beginning in the early 1960s. For about 25 years, she focused on jewelry-making as an artistic pursuit, while working as an X-ray technician alongside her husband Dr. Louis Finger. When she returned to photography in the late 1980s, she began working for the first time in color, including on a series of photographs of people with tattoos. By the early 2000s she had returned to her signature black-and-white film.

Cherry continued shooting street photography into her eighties. She was injured while photographing an anti-war protest in Manhattan – crushed by the crowd, she broke her hip, a wrist, and several ribs. Speaking of this event, she later said "I wasn't as fast as I used to be."

== Personal life ==
Cherry was married four times; three of the marriages ended in divorce. She had one son, Steven Schmidt.

She died in Albuquerque, NM on March 4, 2019. She was 98 years old.

== Publications ==
- Helluva Town: New York in the 1940s and 50s. New York: powerHouse, 2008. ISBN 978-1-57687-404-2. With a text by Barbara Head Millstein.
- Vivian Cherry's New York. New York: powerHouse, 2010. ISBN 978-1-57687-519-3. With an essay by Julia Van Haaften.

== Collections ==
Cherry's work is held in the following permanent collections:

- Museum of Modern Art, New York: 4 prints (as of December 2019)
- Brooklyn Museum, Brooklyn, NY: 25 prints (as of December 2019)
- International Center of Photography, New York: 3 prints (as of December 2019)
- The Jewish Museum, New York: 3 prints
- National Portrait Gallery, Washington DC: 1 print

== Exhibitions ==
=== Solo exhibitions ===
- Vivian Cherry: a Working Street Photographer, 1940s–1990s, Brooklyn Museum, Brooklyn, NY, 2000

=== Group exhibitions ===
- Life of the City, Museum of Modern Art, New York, 2002
- Photography Collection: Rotation 4, Museum of Modern Art, New York, 2006–2007
