= Eliot Elisofon =

American photographer

- Born: April 17, 1911; New York City, U.S.
- Died: April 7, 1973 (aged 61); New York City, U.S.
- Education: DeWitt Clinton High School; Fordham University
- Occupation: photojournalist
- Known for: Photo League
- Spouse(s): Mavis Lyons; Joan Baker Spear

Eliot Elisofon (April 17, 1911 – April 7, 1973) was an American documentary photographer and photojournalist.

== Life ==
From the Lower East Side in New York City, Elisofon graduated from DeWitt Clinton High School in 1929 and Fordham University in 1933. He was married twice, in 1940 to Mavis Lyons, whom he divorced in 1946; and in 1950 to Joan Baker Spear, with whom he had two daughters, Elin and Jill.

Elisofon's childhood struggles inspired his mission as a photographer; whether photographing the neighborhood he grew up in, the poor communities in the South, or exploring other countries, the human condition remained central to his work. His humble upbringing drove Elisofon to succeed and to improve the world around him. From his perspective: "art, to be true art, must grow out of human beings and it must help human beings live a better and fuller life. It must extend the field of feeling and vision we are born with.”

He was a founding member of the Photo League in 1936. He was one of the most active and productive members: he gave guest lectures (1938–43); co-organized the Men at Work project with Lewis Hine (1940); served periodically as president between 1939 and 1941; taught courses on photojournalism and flash photography (1940–41); and participated in numerous exhibitions.

From 1938 to 1942 he ran a commercial photography studio called August and Co., making photographs for advertising and fashion. Elisofon pursued his personal work on the side and studied the work of photographers he admired. Early in his career, Elisofon made it his mission to “point his camera at things that needed attention.” In 1937 he met the photographer and filmmaker Willard Van Dyke who introduced him to Harper's Bazaar art director Alexey Brodovitch, who in turn introduced him to Beaumont Newhall, the curator of photography at MoMA and Tom Maloney, the editor of U.S. Camera. His New York street work was exhibited at the Pennsylvania Museum of Art and the Julien Levy Gallery. In 1938 his series Playgrounds of Manhattan was exhibited at the New School. For Elisofon the series was a way to bring attention to playground conditions for children in poor neighborhoods. He befriended and photographed many artists of the period, including Chaim Gross, Isamu Noguchi and David Smith, and his studio across from the Museum of Modern Art served as a gathering place for artists. He was hired as a photographer in the Federal Writers' Project series, These Are Our Lives, in 1939.

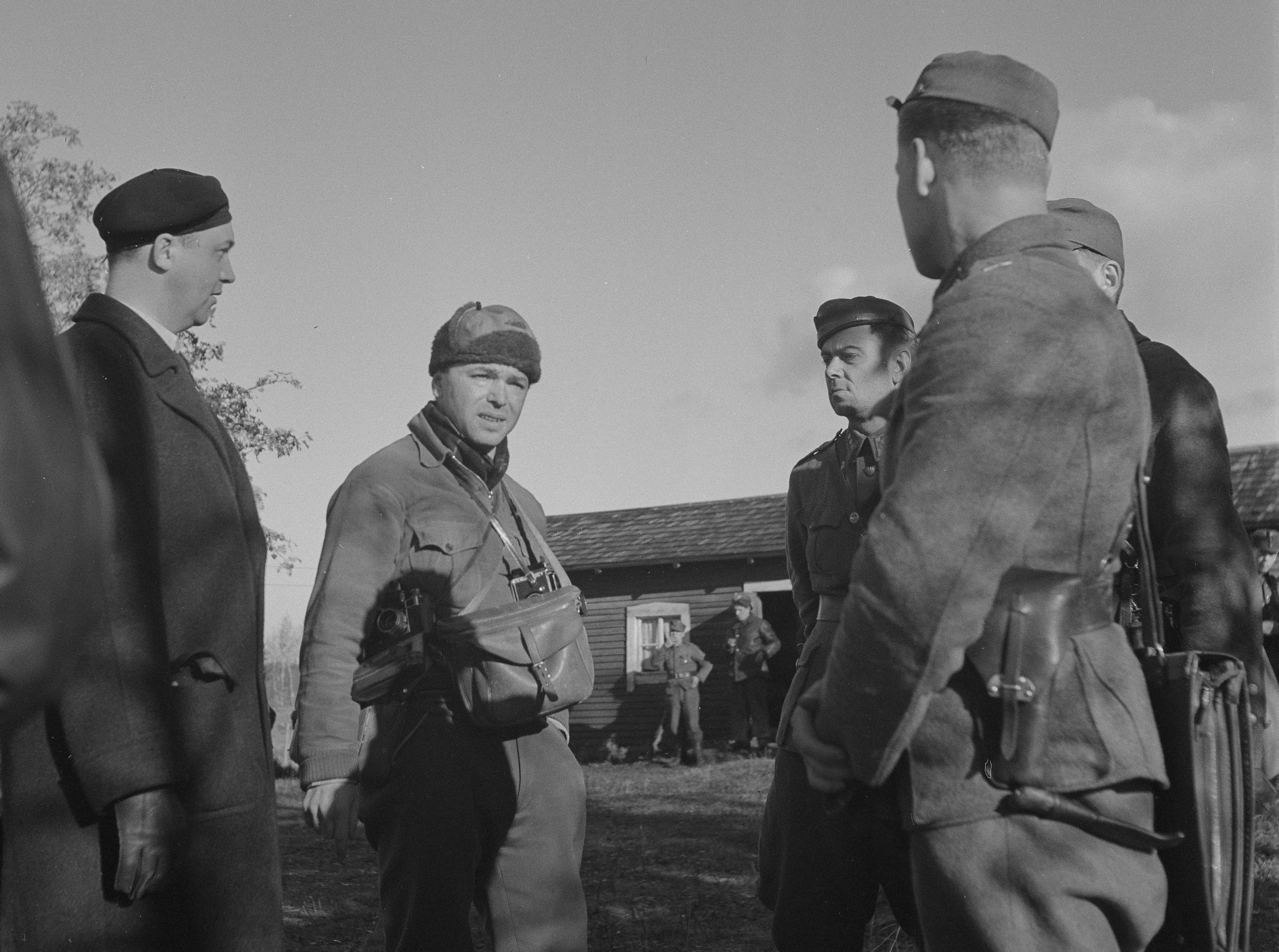
Elisofon (standing in the middle) during Lapland War in Finland.

Elisofon taught at many institutions, including the Institute of American Artists School (1936–1941), the New School (1938), the Clarence H. White School of Photography (November 1940 – April 1941), the Photo League (1941), the New School for Social Research (1942), the Museum of Modern Art, and the School of the Art Institute of Chicago, as well as Yale University, Syracuse University, Radcliffe College, Wellesley College, and Sarah Lawrence College.

Elisofon’s first assignments for Life magazine appeared in 1937, Tin Type Photographer and Jewish New Year, and in 1941 his image of General Patton was the first color cover of Life. Patton was intrigued by Elisofon’s desire to get as close to the action as possible and nicknamed him “Hellzapoppin.” He was the only photographer to accompany Patton throughout the North African Campaign. His photographs became an exhibition titled The Tunisian Triumph, which opened in June 1943 at MoMA and traveled to 20 cities in the United States. From 1942 to 1964 he was a staff photographer for Life magazine.

While on assignment for Life in Hollywood, Elisofon "discovered the potential to use motion picture color filters for expressive use in still photography." In 1951, while photographing the film African Queen, he "shared his theories on color photography" with director John Huston, who subsequently hired him as the color consultant on Huston's next film, Moulin Rouge, in 1952. Elisofon also worked as a color consultant in the 1958 film Bell, Book and Candle, starring Kim Novak, James Stewart, Hermione Gingold, Jack Lemmon, and Ernie Kovacs, and the 1965 film The Greatest Story Ever Told, by director George Stevens.

Over the years, Elisofon travelled to six continents, covering an estimated 2,000,000 miles. His work appeared in Life magazine for almost 30 years and 19 books of his work were published during his lifetime. He made 11 trips to Africa, photographing, making films and collecting art. He donated his extensive collection of African art and a photographic archive of over 80,000 images to what became the National Museum of African Art in Washington, D.C. In 2013 the museum celebrated the 40th Anniversary of the Eliot Elisofon Photographic Archives and art collection with the exhibition Africa Re-Viewed: The Photographic Legacy of Eliot Elisofon.

== Selected exhibitions ==
- February 4, 2015 – April 18, 2015: Eliot Elisofon, Gitterman Gallery, 41 East 57 Street, New York, NY
- November 7, 2013 – November 15, 2014: Africa ReViewed: The Photographic Legacy of Eliot Elisofon at the National Museum of African Art, Smithsonian Institution, Washington, D.C.
- November 4, 2011 – March 25, 2012: "The Radical Camera: New York's Photo League, 1936-1951" at Jewish Museum (New York)
- September 14 – December 18, 2000: "To Help The World to See" — An Eliot Elisofon Retrospective at Harry Ransom Center at the University of Texas in Austin, TX.

== Selected publications ==
- The Technique of Wood Sculpture, with Chaim Gross, Epstein, New York, 1939;
- Food is a Four Letter Word, foreword by Gypsy Rose Lee, Rinehart, 1948;
- African Folktales and Sculpture, James Johnson Sweeny, Bollingen Series XXX11, 1953;
- The Art of Indian Asia by Heinrich Zimmer, edited by Joseph Campbell,, Bollingen Foundation, 1955;
- The Sculpture of Africa, text by William Fagg, Praeger, 1955
- Color Photography, Viking, 1961 with an introduction by Laurens van der Post, Viking, 1964;
- Africa's Animals, with Marvin Newman, Doubleday, 1967;
- Hollywood Style, text by Arthur Knight, Macmillan, 1969;
- Java Diary, Macmillan, 1969;
- The Cooking of India, text by Santha Rama Rau, Time/Life Books, 1969;
- The Hollywood Style, text by Arthur Knight, Macmillan, 1969;
- The Cooking of Japan, text by Rafael Steinberg, illustrations, Time/Life Books, 1970;
- A Week in Agata's World: Poland, Crowell-Collier, 1970;
- A Week in Leonora's World: Puerto Rico, Crowell-Collier, 1971;
- Erotic Spirituality: The Vision of Konarak, text by Alan Watts, Macmillan, 1971, 1974;
- Zaire, A Week in Joseph's World, Crowell-Collier, 1973.
