= Lisette Model =

Austrian-American photographer (1901–1983)

- Born: Elise Amelie Felicie Stern; November 10, 1901; Vienna, Austria-Hungary
- Died: March 30, 1983 (aged 81); New York City, US
- Occupation: Photographer

Lisette Model (born Elise Amelie Felicie Stern; November 10, 1901 – March 30, 1983) was an Austrian-born American photographer primarily known for the frank humanism of her street photography.

A prolific photographer in the 1940s and a member of the New-York cooperative Photo League, she was published in PM's Weekly, Harper's Bazaar, and US Camera before taking up teaching in 1949 through the intermediary of Ansel Adams. She continued to photograph and taught at the New School for Social Research in New York from 1951 until her death in 1983 with many notable students, the most famous of whom was Diane Arbus. Her work has been shown in numerous exhibitions and resides in several permanent collections, including that of the National Gallery of Canada, the J. Paul Getty Museum, and the National Portrait Gallery.

== Early life and education ==
Lisette Model was born Elise Amelie Felicie Stern in the family home in the 8th district of Vienna, Austria-Hungary. Her father, Victor, was an Italian/Austrian doctor of Jewish descent attached to the Austro-Hungarian Imperial and Royal Army and, later, to the International Red Cross; her mother Felicie was French and Catholic, and Model was baptised into her mother's faith. She had a brother, Salvatór, who was older by one year. Due to growing anti-Semitism in Austria and her father's struggle with his Jewish-Austrian identity, he had their last name changed to Seybert in February 1903, and six years later, her younger sister Olga was born. According to interview testimony from her older brother, she was sexually molested by her father, though the full extent of his abuse remains unclear.

She had a bourgeois upbringing, was primarily educated by a series of private tutors, achieving fluency in Italian, German, and French. Her private education continued even when the family suffered financial strain after WWI. Despite her privileged upbringing, she frequently recalled her childhood as difficult. At age 19, she began studying music with composer (and father of her childhood friend Gertrude) Arnold Schoenberg, and was familiar to members of his circle. "If ever in my life I had one teacher and one great influence, it was Schoenberg", she said. There is little known about her art education, but her connection with Schoenberg exposed her to the contemporary art scene and leading avant-garde artists such as Gustav Klimt. Early exposure to Expressionism was what perhaps influenced her interest in observing people, and subsequently, photography.

Model left Vienna with Olga and Felicie for Paris after her father died of cancer in 1924 to study voice with Polish soprano Marya Freund in 1926. Felicie and Olga moved on to Nice, but Lisette stayed in Paris, the new cultural hub after WWI, to continue studying music. It was during this period that she met her future husband, the Jewish, Russian-born painter Evsa Model (1901–1976), whom she went on to marry in September 1937. In 1933, she gave up music and recommitted herself to studying visual art, at first taking up painting as a student of Andre Lhote (whose other students included Henri Cartier-Bresson and George Hoyningen-Huene).

From 1926 to 1933, she underwent psychoanalysis for childhood trauma, but little is known as to why. It is believed that her father molested her in her childhood. These years were referred to as her lonely period, as she frequented cafés alone and struggled to immerse herself into a radically different social group than the bourgeoisie class she had grown up surrounded by.

== First photographs ==
Model bought her first enlarger and camera when she went to Italy. She had little training or interest in photography initially; it was Olga who taught her the basics of photographic technique. Model was most interested in the darkroom process, and wanted to become a darkroom technician. She used her sister as a subject to start her photography. Model claimed that "I just picked up a camera without any kind of ambition to be good or bad", but her friends from Vienna and Paris would go on to say that she had high standards for herself and a strong desire to excel at whatever she did. She also stated that the only lesson she ever got in photography, other than from her sister, was from Rogi André, who told her "Never photograph anything you are not passionately interested in", a quote she would rework later and become well-known for in her teaching career: "Shoot from the gut". André showed Model how to use the Rolleiflex, expanding her practice.

Her decision to become a professional photographer came from a conversation in late 1933 or early 1934 with a fellow Viennese émigré and former student of Schoenberg, Hanns Eisler (who had previously fled Germany once Hitler came into power). He warned her about the need to survive during a time of high political tension, pushing her to earn a living by photographing. Visiting her mother in Nice in 1934, Model took her camera out on the Promenade des Anglais and made a series of portraits – published in 1935 in the leftist magazine Regards – which are still among her most widely reproduced and exhibited images. These close-cropped, often clandestine portraits of the local privileged class already bore what would become her signature style: close-up, unsentimental and unretouched expositions of vanity, insecurity and loneliness. Model's compositions and closeness to her subjects were achieved by enlarging and cropping her negatives in the darkroom. Additionally, her use of a 2 1/4 inch square negative and larger print size were stylistic choices considered unique at a time when a proliferation of street photographers were embracing what was called the miniature camera (35 mm film camera). Later examination of her negatives by archivists reveals that the uncropped images include much of the subjects' physical surroundings. Model's edits in the darkroom eliminate those distractions, tightening the focus on the person and excluding extraneous background information. After the publication of the Promenade des Anglais images, or the "Riviera" series, Model resumed her Paris street photography practice, this time focusing on the poor.

== Later work and controversy ==
Neither Evsa nor Lisette was in possession of French citizenship, and they were well aware of building political tension in Europe, so they emigrated to Manhattan in 1938. Their first home was the Art Deco Master Apartments, but it soon became too expensive and they moved several times in their first few years in New York. The couple, especially Evsa, were known to be very social, frequenting cafés, and especially places with performers that Lisette liked to photograph.

Model claimed that she did not take any photographs in the first 18 months she lived in New York, but an envelope dated 1939 contained many negatives of Battery Park, Wall Street, Delancey Street, and the Lower East Side depicting ordinary American people. She quickly became a prominent photographer, and by 1941, she had published her work in Cue, PM's Weekly, and U.S. Camera. She was captivated by the energy of New York City, which she expressed through her separate series Reflections and Running Legs. Interested in American consumerism and a culture very different from her own, Model began photographing Reflections, a series that explored manufactured images, and products or consumers in window reflections. She was recognized for her radical deviation from traditional viewpoint, and preoccupation with notions of glamour and anti-glamour. This series along with her work Running Legs attracted the attention of editors Carmel Snow and Alexey Brodovitch from Harper's Bazaar, a magazine she went on to work for from 1941 through 1955. One of her first assignments was to photograph Coney Island, in which she took some of her most recognized works such as "Coney Island Bather". Her vision was of great interest to the editors at Harper's Bazaar, but by the 1950s, her involvement decreased dramatically, and she only published two assignments: "A Note on Blindness" and "Pagan Rome".

In 1944, she and Evsa became naturalized U.S citizens. Letters dated that same year revealed Model's family was financially struggling in Europe, and that her mother had died of cancer on October 21.

Model eventually became a prominent member of the New York Photo League and studied with Sid Grossman. Despite the League's effort to maintain that it was a cultural, photographic organization, political pressure led to the League's demise in 1951. During its existence, Model was an active League member and served as a judge in membership print competitions. In 1941, the League hosted her first solo exhibition. From 1941 to 1953, she was a freelance photographer and contributed to many publications including Harper's Bazaar, Look, and Ladies' Home Journal.

Model's involvement with the New York Photo League became the cause of much strife for her during the McCarthy Era of the 1950s, when the organization came under scrutiny by the House Un-American Activities Committee for suspected connections to the Communist Party. Though the League was not officially a political organization, many of its members used photography as a means for social awareness and change, but Model herself did not identity as a political or documentary photographer. The League was eventually classified as a communist organization by the FBI, who interviewed Model personally in 1954 and attempted to recruit her as an informant. She refused to cooperate with the Bureau, leading to her name being placed on the National Security Watchlist. Because many clients were reluctant to hire somebody who was under FBI suspicion, Model encountered increased difficulty finding opportunities to work, which played a role in her focus shift towards teaching.

== Teaching and Guggenheim Fellowship ==
Model embarked on a prolific teaching career in the latter half of her life, both institutionally and in private. In 1946 she visited California for the first time, and became good friends with members of the Photography Department of the California School of Fine Arts, established by Ansel Adams in 1946. While they were in the west, their landlord was illegally evicting tenants from their Grove Street apartment in NYC. The landlord's reasons for doing so are unknown, but by the time the Models returned to New York, their friends had taken care of their belongings.

In 1949, she taught photography at CSFA. She left for California to teach in part for economic reasons and due to her friendship with Ansel Adams, who extended an informal invitation to a teaching position. She stayed from August until at least November of that year as a "Special instructor in documentary photography" in the Department of Photography. She did not produce much of her own work at that time, possibly because of her failure to receive the Guggenheim Fellowship the previous year.

In spring 1951, Model was invited to teach at the New School for Social Research in New York City, where her longtime friend Berenice Abbott was also teaching photography. The New School had a liberal, humanistic approach to education and a high number of European refugees on staff. Known for her straightforward way of addressing her students, and unorthodox teaching style, Model realized she had a talent for teaching. Her teaching notebooks make frequent references to using children's art as example to show that art was an exploration of the world, and not a replication of what was already in place. She strongly focused on challenging her students to strive for the subjective experience and the utmost creativity, sometimes inspiring students, but alienating others. She did not tolerate lukewarm effort, and was ruthlessly critical of students' work that lacked passion.

She also offered private workshops with Evsa from their apartment. Model's best known pupil was Diane Arbus, who studied under her in 1957, and Arbus owed much of her early technique to Model. Arbus's husband Allan was quoted attributing her development as an artist to Model: "That was Lisette. Three sessions and Diane was a photographer." Larry Fink, Helen Gee, John Gossage, Harry Lapow, Charles Pratt, Eva Rubinstein and Rosalind Solomon were also students of Model's. For twenty years she taught the program with little variation and routinely followed the same principles. She continued to teach in New York after the passing of her husband Evsa in 1976, both at the New School and at the International Center of Photography. In 1981 she was awarded an honorary Doctorate of Fine Arts by the New School.

In 1964, Model once again applied for the Guggenheim Fellowship, and in 1965 she was awarded the fellowship of $5,000 for a period of one year. In 1966 she went to Los Angeles and Las Vegas, with the intention to photograph anti-glamour of American culture. She also went to photograph in Italy, but due to ill health she returned to New York earlier than anticipated, and was diagnosed and successfully treated for uterine cancer.

== Final years ==
In the 1970s, Model developed rheumatism in her hands, but continued to diligently teach and photograph. The first book of Model's photographs was published in 1979 by Aperture and included a preface by Berenice Abbott. Marvin Israel designed the book. Fifty-two photographs made from 1937 to 1970 were reproduced at a large enough scale to correspond with her preferred dimension of 16 × 20 inches.

In early 1970 she applied to the Ingram Merrill Foundation and was awarded $2,500, and in March 1973 she received a Creative Artists Public Service Program award for $2,500. In the later half of her career, Model's work underwent a steep drop in print production. She hadn't stopped shooting photographs; she had simply stopped printing them. Much like some of the hazier details of her biography, the reason for this change has not been conclusively identified. Speculation points toward declining health and self-efficacy, increased energy directed towards teaching, and precarious financial situation as some of the primary causes. Nevertheless, Model continued to shoot and teach until her death. She was especially inspired to photograph when away from home, such as her photographs of students in Berkeley in 1973, Lucerne in 1977, Venice in 1979, and so on. She even returned to Nice, France, for the first time in nearly thirty years. However, she did not find the same inspiration there that she once had when photographing her first influential series Promenade des Anglais.

Model's image is included in the iconic 1972 poster Some Living American Women Artists by Mary Beth Edelson.

In January 1976, Evsa suffered a heart attack, which required constant care and monitoring. His health continued to decline until his death later that same year. His death deeply affected Lisette, who continued to live in the basement apartment they had shared for many years.

Even during her twilight hours, her work was exhibited in Germany, Japan, and the Netherlands, to name a few, and in 1982 she received the Medal of the City of Paris. On March 4, she gave her last lecture at Haverford College, and she died at New York Hospital on March 30, 1983, from heart and respiratory disease.

The estate of Lisette Model is represented by Bruce Silverstein Gallery, New York, New York. This estate was responsible for the release of a mass of information on the notoriously private Model after her death, including 25,000 negatives (many hundreds unprinted), personal letters, lectures, press clippings, and many more sources. The release of this information made up for the previous dearth of accurate details on Model's life, which could be partially attributed to her mistrust of written publications. She refused the release of interviews, and allegedly even sabotaged a manuscript about her by Phillip Lopate. It is suspected that she may have fudged the truth about her past more than once, and her reticence to release information may have been due to a fear of revealing this misinformation and unclouding her personal history. Regardless, there is a wealth of knowledge to be found, thanks to the meticulous preservation of her estate.

== Awards ==
- Guggenheim Fellowship, 1965
- American Association of Magazine Photographers Honorary Membership, 1968
- Creative Artists Public Service Program Award, 1973
- New School of Social Research Honorary Doctorate of Fine Arts, 1981
- Medal of the City of Paris, 1982

== Exhibitions and collections ==
1. 1940 "Sixty Photographs: A Survey of Camera Esthetics" – Museum of Modern Art, New York, NY
2. 1941 "Lisette Model" – Photo League, New York, NY
3. 1943 "Action Photography" – Museum of Modern Art, New York, NY, "Photographs by Lisette Model" – Art Institute of Chicago
4. 1944 "New Yorkers" – Museum of Modern Art, New York, NY, "Art in Progress" – Museum of Modern Art, New York, NY
5. 1946 "The Museum Collection of Photography" – Museum of Modern Art, New York, NY
6. 1948 "A Survey of Today's Photography" – Museum of Modern Art, New York, NY, "Fifty Photographs by Fifty Photographers" – Museum of Modern Art, New York, NY
7. 1949 "Leading Photographers: Lisette Model" – Museum of Modern Art, New York, NY
8. 1951 "Twelve Photographers" – Museum of Modern Art, New York, NY
9. 1953 "Contemporary American Photography" – Museum of Modern Art, New York, NY
10. 1954 "Great Photographers" – Limelight Gallery, New York, NY
11. 1955 "The Family of Man" – Museum of Modern Art, New York, NY
12. 1957 "70 Photographers Look at New York" – Museum of Modern Art, New York, NY
13. 1958 "Photographs from the Museum Collection" – Museum of Modern Art, New York, NY
14. 1960 "A Bid for Space" – Museum of Modern Art, New York, NY
15. 1963 "A Bid for Space" – Museum of Modern Art, New York, NY
16. 1965 "Invitational Exhibition, 10 American Photographers" – University of Wisconsin, Milwaukee
17. 1967 "Photography in the 20th Century" – National Gallery of Canada, Ottawa, Canada
18. 1969 "The Camera and the Human Facade" – Smithsonian Institution, Washington D.C.
19. 1970 "The People Yes" – Floating Foundation of Photography, New York, NY
20. 1972 "Brodovitch and His Influence" – Philadelphia College of Art, Philadelphia, PA
21. 1973 "Threads and No Threads" – Floating Foundation of Photography, New York, NY
22. 1974 "American Masters" – Smithsonian Institution, Washington D.C.
23. 1975 "Women of Photography: An Historical Survey" – San Francisco Museum of Modern Art, San Francisco, CA
24. 1976 "The Photographer and the Artist" – Sidney Janis Gallery, New York, NY, "Lisette Model Photographs" – Sander Gallery, Washington D.C.
25. 1977 "New York: the City and Its People" – A and A Gallery, Yale, New Haven, CN, "Appearances" – Marlborough Gallery, New York, NY, "Three-Woman Show: Diane Arbus, Lisette Model, Rosalind Solomon" – Galerie Zabriskie, Paris, France, "Photographs from the Collection of the Center for Creative Photography" – Center for Creative Photography, Carmel, CA, "Photographs from the Collection #1: America" – Philadelphia Museum of Art, Philadelphia, PA
26. 1978 "New Standpoints: Photography 1940–1955" – Museum of Modern Art, New York, NY, "Photographic Crossroads: The Photo League" – National Gallery of Canada, Ottawa, Canada, "The Quality of Presence" – Lunn Gallery, Washington D.C., "How Photography Clicked" – Floating Foundation of Photography, New York, NY
27. 1978, Rencontres de la photographie, Arles, France
28. 1979 Monograph published by Aperture, "Lisette Model: Photographs" – Vision Gallery, Boston, MA, "August Sander, Lisette Model" – Port Washington Public Library, Port Washington, NY
29. 1980 Watari Gallery, Tokyo, Japan, Photographers Gallery, South Yarra, Australia, Ikona Gallery, Venice, Italy, "The Magical Eye: Definitions of Photography" – National Gallery of Canada, Ottawa, Canada
30. 1981, PPS Gallery, Hamburg, Germany, "Carl Siembab: A Photographic Patron" – Institute of Contemporary Art, Boston, MA, "Photography of the Fifties: An American Perspective" – Center for Creative Photography, Carmel, CA, "Lisette Model" – Galerie Viviane Esders, Paris, France, "Lisette Model: A Retrospective" – New Orleans Museum of Art, New Orleans, LA
31. 1982 "Lisette Model" – Berner-Photo Galerie, Bern, Switzerland, "Lisette Model, A Retrospective" – Museum Folkwang, Essen, Germany
32. 1983 "Weegee, Lisette Model, Diane Arbus" – Comfort Gallery, Haverford, PA, "Lisette Model: A Celebration of Genius" – Parsons Exhibition Center, New York, NY, "Lisette Model" – Sander Gallery, New York, NY
33. 1984 "Lisette Model/Evsa Model" – Ikona Gallery, Venice, Italy, "Lisette Model" – Jane Corkin Gallery, Toronto, Canada
34. 1985 "The New York School Photographs: Part One" – Corcoran Gallery of Art, Washington D.C., "The New York School Photographs: Part Two" – Corcoran Gallery of Art, Washington D.C., "Masters of the Street II" – Museum of Photographic Arts, San Diego, CA
35. 1987 "Vintage Women" – Photocollect, New York, NY
36. 1988 "Lisette Model: Vintage Photographs" – Germans Van Eck Gallery, New York, NY
37. 1989 "Noted Women Photographers of the 20s and 30s" – Jan Kesner Gallery, Los Angeles, CA, "New York: Photography between the Wars" – Metropolitan Museum of Art, New York, NY
38. 1990 "Lisette Model" – National Gallery of Canada, Ottawa, Canada
39. 1991 "Lisette Model" – San Francisco Museum of Modern Art, San Francisco, CA
40. 1991 "Lisette Model" – International Center of Photography, New York, NY
41. 1991 "Lisette Model: Daring to See" – The J. Paul Getty Museum, Malibu, CA
42. 1992 "Lisette Model: Photographien, 1933–1983" – Museum Ludwig, Cologne, Germany
43. 1997 "Lisette Model: Selections from the Collection of the International Center of Photography" – Paine Webber Art Gallery, New York, NY
44. 2000 "Lisette Model" – Kunsthalle Wien, Vienna, Austria
45. 2001 "Lisette Model" – Fotomuseum Winterthur, Zurich, Switzerland
46. 2002 "Lisette Model" – Baudoin Lebon Gallery, Paris, France, "Lisette Model" – L'Espace 14–16 Verneuil, Paris, France
47. 2003 "Lisette Model" – Maurice Keitelman, Paris, France"A Clear Vision: Photographic Works from the F. C. Gundlach Collection" – International House of Photography, Hamburg, Germany
48. 2006 "The Streets of New York: American Photographs from the Collection, 1938–1958" – National Gallery of Art, Washington D.C.
49. 2007 "Lisette Model and Her Successors" – Aperture Gallery, New York, NY
50. 2008 "Lisette Model & Her Successors" – Galleria Carla Sozzani, Milan, Italy
51. 2010 "Lisette Model" – The Galerie nationale du Jeu de Paume, Paris, France
52. 2020 "Photography and the Surreal Imagination" - The Menil Collection, Houston, TX
53. 2025-26 "Lisette Model: Retrospective" - Albertina Museum, Vienna, Austria

=== Permanent collections ===
- Academy Art Museum, Easton, MD
- Albertina, Vienna, Austria
- The Center for Creative Photography, Tucson, AZ
- Centre Pompidou, Paris, France
- Cleveland Museum of Art, Cleveland, OH
- George Eastman House, Rochester, NY
- Getty Museum, Los Angeles, CA
- The Jewish Museum, New York, NY
- Kemper Museum of Contemporary Art, Kansas City, MO
- Los Angeles County Museum of Art, Los Angeles, CA
- The Menil Collection, Houston, TX
- Metropolitan Museum of Art, New York, NY
- Milwaukee Art Museum, Milwaukee, WI
- Museum of Modern Art, New York, NY
- The Museum of Photographic Arts, San Diego, CA
- The National Gallery of Australia, Canberra, Australia
- The National Gallery of Canada, Ottawa, Canada
- de Saisset Museum, Santa Clara, CA
- San Francisco Museum of Modern Art, San Francisco, CA
- Smithsonian American Art Museum, Washington D.C.
- Spencer Museum of Art, Lawrence KS
- Whitney Museum of American Art, New York, NY

== Publications ==
- "Lisette Model: Photographs by Lisette Model", foreword by Berenice Abbott, published in 1979 by Aperture Foundation and reissued in 2008 for the twenty-fifth anniversary of Model's death.
- "Lisette Model" by Ann Thomas, published in 1990 by the National Gallery of Canada to accompany a comprehensive retrospective exhibition of Model's work.
