= Erika Stone =

American photographer

Erika Stone (born June 29, 1924) is an American photographer. She was a member of the New York Photo League.

== Early life ==
Stone was born Erika Klopfer in Frankfurt, Germany, in 1924. Stone's family moved to New York in 1936 to avoid Nazi persecution.

== Photo career ==
Stone worked as a stringer for Der Spiegel and Time. In the 1940s she became a member of the Photo League. Her Bowery Series, documenting the 1940s residents of the southern Manhattan neighborhood, was shot when Stone was just seventeen.

Stone's work is included in the collections of the National Gallery of Canada, the Center for Creative Photography, the George Eastman House and the Columbus Museum of Art. Many of her photographs between 1940 and 1999 are archived in the Erika Stone Photograph Collection of the New York Historical Society Museum and Library.

Stone was the subject of a 2011 documentary by Lars Gerhard titled Erika Stone: A New York Scene.
