= John Ebstel =

American artist

- Born: 1919; Philadelphia, Pennsylvania
- Died: 2000 (aged 80–81); New York City, New York

John Ebstel (1919–2000) was an American photographer.

Ebstel was a member of the New York City Photo League, where he also taught photography. His work is included in the collections of the Museum of Fine Arts Houston, and the Jewish Museum, New York.
