= Sandra Weiner =

Polish-American photographer

Sandra Weiner (née Smith; 1921–2014) was a Polish-American street photographer and children's book author.

Weiner was born in Drohiczan, Poland, and emigrated to the United States in 1928. She joined the Photo League in 1942. There, she first studied under photographers Paul Strand, and Dan Weiner whom she would later marry. Following the dissolution of the Photo League in 1951, she was a commercial photographer in the 1950s and later wrote four published children's books.

== Collections ==
Weiner's work is held in the following permanent collections:

- San Francisco Museum of Art
- International Center of Photography
- Metropolitan Museum of Art, New York: 1 print (as of August 2020)
- Akron Art Museum

Her personal papers are held in the University of Minnesota libraries.

== Children's books ==
- It's Wings That Make Birds Fly (1968)
- Small Hands, Big Hands (1970)
- They Call Me Jack (1973)
- I Want to be a Fisherman (1977)
