= Floating Foundation of Photography =

The Floating Foundation of Photography was a New York photography exhibition space, meeting place and teaching center. It is famous as a gathering place for a generation of influential New York photographers, including W. Eugene Smith, Arthur Tress, Mary Ellen Mark, Les Krims, Judy Dater, Lisette Model and Lee Witkin. It was also one of the first institutions to engage in teaching photography in socially marginalized communities such as prisons, mental institutions and drug rehabilitation programs.

The Foundation was founded by photographer Maggie Sherwood in 1970 after she bought an old houseboat, painted it purple and offered it as a gallery and photo center for many of her friends. Within a few years she added a classroom and darkrooms. The houseboat was originally moored at the 79th Street Boat Basin, but in later years it traveled up and down the Hudson River. Photography critic A. D. Coleman wrote: "Moored at the literal edge of Manahattan, marginal by definition, it served a key role as the medium of photography itself moved from the periphery to the center of cultural discourse and creative activity." The Foundation continued to be an influential center for photography in New York until two years after Sherwood's death in 1984.

In 2009 the Samuel Dorsky Museum of Art at the State University of New York at New Paltz mounted a retrospective exhibition about the Floating Foundation, its influences and the photographers who were part of what happened there. The catalog of the exhibition, Taking a Different Tack: Maggie Sherwood and the Floating Foundation of Photography ISBN 978-0-615-25833-1, includes many images of the photographers who met there and the houseboat itself.
