= Morris Huberland =

Polish-American photographer

Morris Huberland (1909–2003) was a Polish-American photographer. Huberland is best known for his black and white documentary photography of New York City street scenes.

== Early life ==
Huberland was born in Warsaw, Congress Poland in 1909. His family moved the United States in 1920, where Huberland would grow up in the Jewish Ghetto of the Lower East Side. He began taking photos at the age of sixteen. In 1940, he joined the New York Photo League. He joined the US Army in 1943, eventually becoming a corporal.

== Collections ==
Huberland's work is included in the collections of:

- the Art Institute of Chicago
- the Columbus Museum of Art
- the Jewish Museum, New York
- the Los Angeles County Museum of Art
- the Metropolitan Museum of Art
- the Museum of Fine Arts Houston
- the National Gallery of Canada
- the Smithsonian Museum of American Art
- the New-York Historical Society Museum and Library
- the Samuel Dorsky Museum of Art
- the San Francisco Museum of Modern Art
- the Smart Museum of Art
- the New York Public Library
