= Lucy Ashjian =

Polish-American photographer

- Born: 1907; Indianapolis, Indiana, U.S.
- Died: 1993 (aged 85–86); Davis, California, U.S.
- Education: Butler University, Clarence H. White School of Photography

Lucy Ashjian (1907–1993) was an American photographer. She is known as a member of the Photo League a photographer's cooperative in New York City. Her work is included in the collections of the Metropolitan Museum of Art, New York, the Center for Creative Photography in Tucson, Arizona and the Museum of the City of New York.

== Early life ==
Ashjian was born in Indianapolis, Indiana, to Armenian refugees. She received a degree in English from Butler University in 1927. In 1937 she graduated from the Clarence H. White School of Photography.

== Career ==
Ashjian joined the New York Photo League in 1937 as a photographer, also serving as Photos Notes editor and board chair of the League's school.

She was included in the 2012 exhibition The Radical Camera: New York's Photo League, 1936–1951 held at the Jewish Museum, New York.

== Collections ==
Ashjian's work is held in the following permanent collections:

- Center for Creative Photography, Tucson, Arizona
- Columbus Museum of Art, Columbus, Ohio
- George Eastman Museum
- The Jewish Museum, New York
- Metropolitan Museum of Art, New York
- Museum of the City of New York
- Philadelphia Museum of Art
- Princeton University Art Museum
