= Marvin E. Newman =

American artist and photographer (1927–2023)

- Born: Marvin Elliott Newman; December 5, 1927; The Bronx, New York, U.S.
- Died: September 13, 2023 (aged 95); Jersey City, New Jersey, U.S.
- Occupations: Artist; photographer
- Website: marvinenewman.com

Marvin Elliott Newman (December 5, 1927 – September 13, 2023) was an American artist and photographer.

== Early life and education ==
Marvin Elliott Newman was born in The Bronx "to a family of Russian Jews who'd been in the bakery business for four generations". At age 16, he entered Brooklyn College where he studied sculpture and photography with Walter Rosenblum. In 1948, Newman briefly joined the Photo League where he took classes with John Ebstel. He graduated from Brooklyn with a bachelor's degree in economics in 1949.

In 1949, he moved to Chicago to study at the Institute of Design with Harry Callahan and Aaron Siskind. After obtaining an MS degree in photography in 1952, he moved back to New York City.

== Career ==
Newman began working at Sports Illustrated soon after it began publishing in 1954. He also worked with Time/Life Books and advertising agencies. He contributed to various other publications including Life, Look, Newsweek and Smithsonian and Newsweek.

Newman authored or coauthored eight books on the subject of photography. He was at one time the national president of the American Society of Magazine Photographers.

== Personal life and death ==
Newman had a sister. His first marriage, to Julia Scully, a former editor of Modern Photography magazine, ended in divorce. His second marriage, to Marja Loukkola with whom he had a daughter, also ended in divorce. His third marriage was to Dr. Brigitte (Genin) Newman, with whom he had a son.

Marvin E. Newman died on September 13, 2023, at the age of 95.

== Publications ==
- The Color of Sweden, 1966.
- Africa's Animals, 1967.
- New York at Night. Stewart Tabori and Chang, 1984. Full color portfolio of Times Square in the 1950s.
- Hallmark Collection. The Art Institute of Chicago, 1994.
- American Photographs 1900/2000. Assouline, 2000. Two published photographs.
- Yankee Colors: The Glory Years of the Mantle Era. 2009. With text by Al Silverman.
- The Classic Mantle. 2012. With text by Buzz Bissinger.
- Marvin E. Newman. Taschen, Collector’s Edition of 1,000 Copies, 2017.

== Exhibitions ==
=== Solo exhibitions ===
- 1981: Breaking Ground, Open Spaces Temporary and Accidental, photographs by Newman, text by Brendan Gill. One man show. Municipal Art Society of New York.
- 2006: Marvin E. Newman: The First Decade. Bruce Silverstein Gallery, New York.
- 2008: Marvin E. Newman: The Color Series. Bruce Silverstein Gallery, New York.

=== Group exhibitions ===
- 1953: Always the Young Strangers, Museum of Modern Art, New York. Included the work of 25 young photographers.
- 1982: Manhattan, color photographic show, The Museum of the City of New York.
- 1989: Life through the Sixties, International Center of Photography, New York.:
- 1994: Hallmark Collection, Art Institute of Chicago, I C P Midtown, New York.
- 1995: Institute of Design, Museum of Contemporary Photography, Chicago, Illinois.
- 1998: New acquisitions Exhibition, Metropolitan Museum of Art, New York.
- 2010: Discoveries. Bruce Silverstein Gallery, New York.
- 2010: Beyond Color, Bruce Silverstein Gallery, New York.

== Awards ==
- Gold Medal for Editorial Photography from the Art Directors Club of New York
- 2009: Lucie Award for Achievement in Sports Photography

== Collections ==
Newman's work is held in the following permanent collections:

- Art Institute of Chicago
- National Gallery of Art, Washington, DC
- Museum of Fine Arts, Houston, Texas
- The Jewish Museum, New York
- The Metropolitan Museum of Art, New York
- Museum of Modern Art, New York
- Whitney Museum of American Art, New York
