= Ida Wyman =

American photographer (1926–2019)

- Ida Wyman at Burbank Airport, Los Angeles, 1950
- Born: Ida Dora Wyman; March 7, 1926; Malden, Massachusetts, U.S.
- Died: July 13, 2019 (aged 93); Fitchburg, Wisconsin, U.S.
- Occupation: Photographer

Ida Dora Wyman (March 7, 1926 – July 13, 2019) was an American photographer best known for her documentary photography of New York street life.

== Early life ==
Wyman was born in Malden, Massachusetts on March 7, 1926. She grew up in the Bronx, New York. Wyman began her photography career while she was in high school, by taking photos of her neighborhood. Before becoming a photographer, Wyman had planned to be a nurse.

Wyman can be heard as a contestant on the 15th November 1950 edition of You Bet Your Life.

Wyman died in Fitchburg, Wisconsin on Saturday, July 13, 2019.

== Work ==
Wyman was a member of New York City's Photo League. During the 1940s and '50s, she shot over one hundred assignments for Life magazine. Working from the west coast, she was often assigned to photograph movie stars on set, such as James Cagney in White Heat.

By 1962 Wyman had given up professional photography, taking a job at Haskins Laboratories in New York. Manhattan. She returned to photography in 1968, as a pathology photographer in the department of medicine at Columbia University. It was not until her 70s and 80s that she began to receive critical acclaim for her work.

Her work is included in the permanent collection of the Jewish Museum, New York.
