= Society for Accessible Travel & Hospitality =

American non-profit organization

The Society for Accessible Travel & Hospitality, or SATH, is a New York based non-profit organization founded in 1976 and dedicated to the promotion of accessibility in the travel & tourism industries.

== Mission ==
SATH's mission is "to raise awareness of the needs of all travelers with disabilities, remove physical and attitudinal barriers to free access and expand travel opportunities in the United States and abroad."

Through lobbying and education efforts, the Society has been credited with helping secure such acts as the Americans With Disabilities Act.

== Awards ==
SATH presents a number of awards including the Murray Award and Access to Freedom Award, which are given to industry practitioners that accommodate the needs of disabled travelers.

== See also ==
- Travelers Aid International
