= Photo League =

New York City photographer's cooperative (1936–1951)

The Photo League was a cooperative of photographers in New York who banded together around a range of common social and creative causes. Founded in 1936, the League included some of the most noted American photographers of the mid-20th century among its members. It ceased operations in 1951 following its placement in 1947 on the U.S. Department of Justice blacklist with accusations that it was a communist, anti-American organization.

== Origins ==
The League's origins traced back to a project of the Workers International Relief (WIR), a Communist association based in Berlin. In 1930, the WIR established the Workers Camera League in New York City, which soon came to be known as the Film and Photo League. Its goals were to "struggle against and expose reactionary film; to produce documentary films reflecting the lives and struggles of the American workers; and to spread and popularize the great artistic and revolutionary Soviet productions".

== Ethos ==
In 1934, the still photographers and the filmmakers in the League began having differences of opinion over social and production interests, and by 1936 they had formed separate groups. Paul Strand and Ralph Steiner established Frontier Films, to continue promoting the original goals, while Strand and Berenice Abbott renamed the original group "The Photo League". The two organizations remained friendly, with members of each group often participating in activities of the other. The goal of the newly reformed Photo League was to "put the camera back into the hands of honest photographers who ... use it to photograph America".

The League quickly became active in the new field of socially conscious photography. Unlike other photography organizations, it did not espouse a particular visual style but instead concentrated on "integrating formal elements of design and visual aesthetics with the powerful and sympathetic evidence of the human condition". It also offered basic and advanced classes in photography when there were few such courses in colleges or trade schools. A newsletter, Photo Notes, was printed irregularly, depending upon who was available to do the work and if they could afford the printing costs. More than anything else, though, the League was a gathering place for photographers to share and experience their common artistic and social interests.

== Influential members ==
Among the members of the League were co-founders Sol Libsohn and Sid Grossman (director of the Photo League School); Morris Engel (from 1936); Arthur Leipzig (from 1942); Ruth Orkin, Jerome Liebling, and Lester Talkington (all from 1947); Walter Rosenblum (editor of the Photo League Photo Notes); Eliot Elisofon (a Life magazine photographer); Aaron Siskind; Jack Manning (a member of the Harlem Document Group of the League and a New York Times photographer); Dan Weiner; Bill Witt; Martin Elkort; Lou Bernstein; Sy Kattelson; Louis Stettner; and Lisette Model.

In the early 1940s, the list of notable photographers who were active in the League or supported their activities also included Margaret Bourke-White, Barbara Morgan, W. Eugene Smith, Helen Levitt, FSA photographer Arthur Rothstein, Beaumont Newhall, Nancy Newhall, Richard Avedon, Weegee, Robert Frank, Harold Feinstein, Ansel Adams, Edward Weston and Minor White. The League was the caretaker of the Lewis Hine Memorial Collection, which Hine's son had given the League in recognition of its role in fostering social activism through photography as his father had done.

== Women photographers ==
Unusually for artist groups at the time, about one third of League members and participants were women and they served in visible leadership roles such as secretary, treasurer, vice president, and president. For example, Lucy Ashjian, who joined the League as early as 1936, was Photo Notes editor and board chair of the League's school. Sonia Handelman Meyer was both photographer and secretary, the league's only paid position.

== Blacklisting ==
Many of the members who joined before the end of World War II were first-generation Americans who strongly believed in progressive political and social causes. Few were aware of the political origins of the movement of the communist "Workers as Photographers" (Arbeiterfotografen) in Berlin. This had in fact little to do with what the organization did as it evolved, but helped its downfall after the war, when it was accused by the FBI of being communist, subversive and anti-American.

In December 1947, the Photo League was formally declared a subversive organization and placed on a U.S. Department of Justice blacklist of subversive organizations by Attorney General Tom C. Clark. Following this announcement, the Photo League appeared on the Attorney General's List of Subversive Organizations (AGLOSO) published on March 20, 1948, in the Federal Register.

At first the League fought back and mounted an impressive This Is the Photo League exhibition in 1948, but after its member and long-time FBI informer Angela Calomiris had testified in May 1949 that the League was a front organization for the Communist Party, the Photo League was finished. Recruitment dried up and old members left, including one of its founders and former president, Paul Strand, as well as Louis Stettner. The League disbanded in 1951.

After the League's demise, and with the return of more women to domestic roles in the postwar era, the careers of many promising women artists, such as Sonia Handelman Meyer and Rae Russel, did not continue.

== Legacy ==
The Photo League was the subject of a 2012 documentary film: Ordinary Miracles: The Photo League's New York by Daniel Allentuck and Nina Rosenblum. The film traces the rise and demise of the Photo League between 1936 and 1951, and includes interviews with surviving members and a soundtrack including Woody Guthrie, the Andrews Sisters, and the Mills Brothers. Cineaste Magazine calls the film a "fine addition to the library of documentaries dedicated to remembering the cultural work of the old left."

== Members of the Photo League ==
(Source: The Jewish Museum New York)

- Berenice Abbott, 1898–1991, born Springfield, Ohio
- Alexander Alland, 1902–1989, born Sevastopol, Russian Empire (now Russian-occupied Ukraine)
- Lucy Ashjian, 1907–1993, born Indianapolis, Indiana
- Marynn Older Ausubel, 1912–1980, born New Haven, Connecticut
- Lou Bernstein, 1911–2005, born Manhattan, New York
- Nancy Bulkeley, born United States
- Rudy Burckhardt, 1914–1999, born Basel, Switzerland
- Angela Calomiris, 1916–1995, born Manhattan, New York
- Vivian Cherry, born 1920, Manhattan, New York
- Bernard Cole, 1911–1982, born London, England
- Larry Colwell, 1901–1972, born Detroit, Michigan
- Ann Cooper, born 1912, Manhattan, New York
- Harold Corsini, 1919–2008, born Manhattan, New York
- Jack Delano, 1914–1997, born Voroshilovka, Russian Empire (now Ukraine)
- Robert Disraeli, 1905–1988, born Cologne, Germany
- Arnold Eagle, 1909–1992, born Budapest, Austria-Hungary
- John Ebstel, 1922–2000, born Philadelphia, Pennsylvania
- Myron Ehrenberg, 1907–1977, born Boston, Massachusetts
- Eliot Elisofon, 1911–1973, born Manhattan, New York
- Martin Elkort, 1929–2016, born Manhattan, New York
- Morris Engel, 1918–2005, born Manhattan, New York
- Harold Feinstein, 1931–2015, born Coney Island, New York
- Godfrey Frankel, 1912–1995, born Cleveland, Ohio
- George Gilbert, born 1922, Brooklyn, New York
- Leo Goldstein, 1901–1972, born Kishinev, Russian Empire (now Moldova)
- Sid Grossman, 1913–1955, born Manhattan, New York
- Rosalie Gwathmey, 1908–2001, born Charlotte, North Carolina
- Lewis Wickes Hine, 1874–1940, born Oshkosh, Wisconsin
- Morris Huberland, 1909–2003, born Warsaw, Poland
- N. (Nathan) Jay Jaffee, 1921–1999, born Brooklyn, New York
- Consuelo Kanaga, 1894–1978, born Astoria, Oregon
- Sy (Seymour) Kattelson, born 1923, Manhattan, New York
- Sidney Kerner, born 1920, Brooklyn, New York
- Gabriella Langendorf, born Vienna, Austria
- Arthur Leipzig, 1918–2014, born Brooklyn, New York
- Rebecca Lepkoff, 1916–2014, Manhattan, New York
- Jack Lessinger, 1911–1987, born Manhattan, New York
- Leon Levinstein, 1910–1988, born Buckhannon, West Virginia
- Sol Libsohn, 1914–2001, born Manhattan, New York
- Jerome Liebling, 1924–2011, born Manhattan, New York
- Richard Lyon, 1914–1994, born Manhattan, New York
- Sam Mahl, 1913–1992, born Manhattan, New York
- Jack Manning, 1920–2001, born Manhattan, New York
- Phyllis Dearborn Massar, 1916–2011, born Seattle, Washington
- Tosh Matsumoto, 1920–2010, born Vacaville, California
- Sonia Handelman Meyer, born 1920, Lakewood, New Jersey
- Lisette Model, 1906–1983, born Vienna, Austria-Hungary
- Barbara Morgan (photographer), 1900–1992, born Buffalo, Kansas
- Lida Moser, 1920–2014, born Manhattan, New York
- Arnold Newman, 1918–2006, born Manhattan, New York
- Marvin E. Newman, born 1927, Bronx, New York
- Ruth Orkin, 1921–1985, born Boston, Massachusetts
- Marion Palfi, 1907–1978, born Berlin, Germany
- Bea Pancoast, 1924–2004, born Manhattan, New York
- Sol Prom (Solomon Fabricant), 1906–1989, born Brooklyn, New York
- David Robbins, 1912–1981, born United States
- Walter Rosenblum, 1919–2006, born Manhattan, New York
- Edwin Rosskam, 1903–1985, born Munich, Germany
- Arthur Rothstein, 1915–1985, born Manhattan, New York
- Rae Russel, 1925–2008, born Brooklyn, New York
- Edward Schwartz, 1906–2005, born Brooklyn, New York
- Joe Schwartz, born 1913, Brooklyn, New York
- Ann Zane Shanks, born 1927, Brooklyn, New York
- Lee Sievan, 1907–1990, born Manhattan, New York
- Larry Silver, born 1934, Bronx, New York
- Aaron Siskind, 1903–1991, born Manhattan, New York
- W. Eugene Smith, 1918–1978, born Wichita, Kansas
- Fred Stein, 1909–1967, born Dresden, Germany
- Ralph Steiner, 1899–1986, born Cleveland, Ohio
- Louis Stettner, 1922–2016, born Brooklyn, New York
- Erika Stone, born 1924, Frankfurt, Germany
- Lou Stoumen, 1917–1991, born Springtown, Pennsylvania
- Paul Strand, 1890–1976, born Manhattan, New York
- Rolf Tietgens, 1911–1984, born Hamburg, Germany
- Elizabeth Timberman, 1908–1988, born Columbus, Ohio
- David Vestal, 1924–2013, born Menlo Park, California
- John Vachon, 1914–1975, born St. Paul, Minnesota
- Weegee (Arthur Fellig), 1899–1968, born Zloczów, Austrian Galicia (now Ukraine)
- Dan Weiner, 1919–1959, born Manhattan, New York
- Sandra Weiner, born 1921, Drohiczyn, Poland
- Bill Witt, born 1921, Newark, New Jersey
- Ida Wyman, 1926–2019, born Malden, Massachusetts
- Max Yavno, 1911–1985, born Manhattan, New York; former president
- George S. Zimbel, born 1929–2023, Woburn, Massachusetts
- Cuchi White, 1930-2013, born Cleveland, Ohio, under the name of Katheryn Ann White
