= Lou Bernstein =

American photographer and teacher

- Born: Judah Leon Bernstein; February 28, 1911; New York City
- Died: August 2, 2005 (aged 94); Boca Raton, Florida
- Education: Seward Park H.S. (NYC)
- Occupations: photographer, teacher, columnist, critic, and photographic salesman
- Spouse: Mildred Marder

Lou Bernstein (born Judah Leon Bernstein; February 28, 1911 – August 2, 2005) was an American photographer and teacher. His career began during the Great Depression and the Photo League and ended shortly before he died.

== Early life ==
Bernstein grew up on the Lower East Side of New York City, the oldest son of Jewish immigrants from Romania. Like many of his contemporaries, Bernstein was forced to leave school—in his case, Seward Park H.S.—to help support his family after his father was injured. After selling candy and men's clothing accessories on the streets of New York City for two years, he joined Borrah Minevitch's original Harmonica Rascals (Bernstein had taught himself to play the harmonica when he was seven), a group that toured the country, playing one-night stands wherever they could find work.

After two years on the road, he returned to New York City, where he met Mildred Marder and married her a year later, in 1931. Needing to find a way of supporting himself and his wife, he began studying iron drafting and received a diploma on April 14, 1933, from The General Society of Mechanics and Tradesmen of the City of New York. Because of the Depression, he was never able to find employment in this field. Instead, he began working in the Brooklyn shipyards, which he did for over ten years. In 1937, after the birth of their first child, Millie gave Lou his first camera, "an Argus A2 without a rangefinder" just to take pictures of their new daughter.

== Photographic beginnings ==
Bernstein learned how to take pictures from a friend, Benny Friedman, in exchange for teaching him how to play the harmonica. It did not take Bernstein long to join the Brooklyn Camera Club, his first interaction with others with his interest in photography. However, he found their approach to photography far "too pedagogical." He sought out Sid Grossman and the Photo League in 1940. "Sid helped me find out exactly what sort of work I wanted to do." Even more than at the Brooklyn Camera Club, Bernstein had the opportunity to meet other, like-minded photographers who gravitated to their own neighborhoods, the people and places they knew best, to find their subject matter. This approach served him well. As far as he was concerned, "...there's as much variety in my own back yard as there is in a thousand miles of travel." For the next sixty years, Bernstein continued to photograph in a few selected locations, all within the confines of New York City, returning to them time after time, in search of something better than he had done before. He maintained his relationship with the Photo League, and in particular with Sid Grossman over the years. Even after Grossman resigned from the League, Bernstein continued to attend classes in his teacher's home.

Unwilling to turn "professional," i.e., make his living from paid assignments, yet feeling the need to become more involved in the photographic community, Bernstein began working in the darkroom department at Peerless Camera, then one of the largest photographic supply emporiums in New York City. He worked there from 1945 to 1958 and later at Willoughby's (when the two competitive store merged) until his retirement in 1973. From his perch behind the counter, Bernstein got to meet hundreds of photographers, from rank beginners to notable photographers Edward Steichen, W. Eugene Smith, and Ernst Haas. His position gave him the opportunity to keep abreast of the latest technical developments and to pass on what he had learned. Customers came to him for service and advise, from what to buy to where to find a job in a photo lab. Without knowing it, Bernstein was laying the groundwork for his later career as a teacher and c.

Bernstein's decision not to accept photographic assignments kept him close to his family, within the confines of New York City. It meant that he could choose to photograph what interested him. However, it seriously limited the amount of time he could devote to his pursuit. In typical Bernstein fashion, he turned a negative into a positive: "The way I work, two or three days a week is enough. When I photograph, I give it everything I've got. I get excited and wrought-up. And I get pooped. Like I say, a couple of days a week – good solid days I mean – is usually all that I'm good for."

His approach never varied. He would find an area, a subject matter that interested him, and he would return to it almost obsessively for an inordinate amount of time. Over a period of time, he would get to know the place and the people involved, whether they were the marginalized men who lived at the Fulton Fish Market or the staff at the New York Aquarium. He would photograph for several hours, return home, and process his film. He would print and re-print his best images, constantly trying—even years later—to make the best possible photograph. His one-man show at The Queens Museum of Art in 1989, entitled "Coney Island 1943-1987," included photographs taken in this one small area of Brooklyn over a forty-year period. Bernstein stated that he first began photographing in the Aquarium at Coney Island in 1960; he kept returning there until after the year 2000—a project of over forty years in duration. Over a lifetime a work, Bernstein created a series of projects, all taken in close proximity to where he lived.

== Student and teacher ==
Sid Grossman's approach to photography was critical to Bernstein's development both as an artist and as a mentor to others. Grossman "forced his students to discover not only what constituted a good photograph but, more importantly, their emotional relationship to it." It is only a short step from that idea to what Bernstein himself wrote in 1969, "...I believe that every photograph is a statement by the person taking the picture about how he feels and sees the world and himself. My own photographs are a kind of history of my deepest feelings and how they have changed over the years...". However the latter statement came, not as something he learned from his first teacher. Four years after Grossman's death in 1954, one of Bernstein's colleagues urged him to study with the American poet, critic, and philosopher Eli Siegel. Bernstein began studying Aesthetic Realism in 1962 and continued to do so until 1973. The photographer remained openly grateful to Siegel, writing that "...new doors have been opened up for me. I have become more aware of my own possibilities..." Bernstein had long nurtured a desire to teach photography but felt inhibited. In his own words, "The trouble was, I simply didn't know enough." What his association with Aesthetic Realism gave him was a methodology and a vocabulary to transmit what he had learned to his students. He resumed teaching in 1970 and kept at it for three decades.

Bernstein had benefited greatly from his participation in Sid Grossman's workshops and sought to emulate his teacher's approach. The first thing was for his students to enjoy themselves when they were out photographing. However, Bernstein made some important refinements to the workshop methodology. Students were expected to bring in their work for criticism. But whereas Grossman could be sarcastic and biting in his approach, ("Sid never told me what was good. He only told me what was bad...") Bernstein was always gentle. Any photograph, no matter how amateurish, was a "stepping stone" for something better. In addition, Bernstein encouraged his students to express their own opinions about each other's work—usually before he gave his own evaluation. His stated purpose was to encourage his students to encourage each other, rather than be in competition. By talking about other photographers' work, each student was developing his own critical facility—essential to his own development as a photographer. Just as Grossman continued to teach privately after he left The Photo League in 1949, so too, Bernstein conducted weekly sessions from his home for many years. In 1992, Bernstein estimated that he had worked with over 600 students.

In addition to the informal workshops he conducted, Bernstein also taught formally at various institutions. In 1971, when W. Eugene Smith took a sabbatical from his teaching position at Cooper Union, he recommended that Bernstein take his place. Smith had previously recommended him for a Guggenheim grant in a "Confidential Report on Candidate for Fellowship" from December 1969, as had Wynn Bullock in a letter dated November 17, 1966. The following year, Bernstein taught a similar class, "Creative Approach to Photography," at the Phoenix School for Art and Design. After he had spent years photographing at the New York Aquarium at Coney Island, he was asked to share some of what he had learned in a course entitled "Aquatic Awareness," which he conducted from 1980 to 1985. He also authored a column entitled "Critique" in the magazine Camera 35 from 1968 to 1973, which enabled him to reach a wider audience throughout the United States.

== Exhibitions ==
Although his work was included in exhibitions as early as 1948, Bernstein's rise to prominence as an artist of stature dates from 1955 when two of his photographs were included in Edward Steichen's monumental The Family of Man exhibit. In 1957, he was asked to participate in an exhibition that Nancy Newhalll curated for the United States Information Agency, and for which Ansel Adams created all the prints. After his work was included in exhibitions—among many others—at the Museum of Modern Art in New York City, the Museum Château de Clervaux in Luxembourg, Expo '67 in Montreal, Photokina in Cologne, the Brooklyn Museum, the National Gallery of Canada, and The Museum of Fine Arts, Houston, it was appropriate for Bernstein to have a one-man exhibition, A Retrospective Look, at New York's International Center of Photography (ICP) in 1980.

It was Cornell Capa, the ICP's executive director, who in the brochure for the exhibition described Bernstein as "the Walter Mitty of photography," and added that "This first retrospective of infectious optimism belongs to a man whose preserved memories are his treasures." In 1992, the same ICP honored him with a second exhibition, Five Decades of Photography.

By the time of his death, Bernstein's work had been shown in almost seventy exhibitions, and were part of the collections of, among other institutions, The Museum of Modern Art (New York), the University of Arizona, the Museum of Fine Arts, Houston, Texas, the Spencer Museum of Art at the University of Kansas, the International Center of Photography (NYC), the Columbus Museum of Art (Ohio), the Jewish Museum (Manhattan).

== Final years ==
Shortly after the death of his wife, Mildred, in 2001, Bernstein agreed to relocate to Florida to be with his family. He had been photographing at the New York Aquarium until that time, arriving there almost every day in the early morning before the official opening hour. Once he arrived in Florida, his active career as a photographer came to an end—even though his work continued to be exhibited. He was quoted in 1955 as saying, "It's the photographer, not the material, that wears out first." He died on August 2, 2005, at age 94.

== Collections ==
- International Center of Photography
- Spencer Museum of Art
- The Museum of Fine Arts, Houston
- Museum of Modern Art
- Center For Creative Photography

== General references ==
- Bernstein, Louis and Garibaldi, Louis E. Reflections on an Aquarium. Drum Publications, 1992
- Daitry, Stephen. The Photo League at 75. Stephen Daitry Gallery, 2010
- Della Femina, Donna. Profile. New York Photo District News, August, 1981 p. 10
- Dixon, Daniel. The World Is His Backyard: The Story of Lou Bernstein, Modern Photography, August 1955, Vol. 19, No. 8, p. 80
- Documentary Photography. Richard L. Williams, Editor, Life Library of Photography, Time-Life Books, 1972
- Encyclopedia of Photography. Morgan, Willard D., general editor. Greystone Press, 1963. Vols. 1-20
- Klein, Mason and Evans, Catherine. The Radical Camera: New York's Photo League 1936–1951. Yale University Press, 2012
- Maddow, Ben. Faces: A Narrative History of the Portrait in Photography. New York Graphic Society, 1977
- Siegel Eli, et al. Aesthetic Realism: We Have Been There. Definition Press, 1969
- Steichen, Edward. The Family of Man. The Museum of Modern Art, 1955
