= Dan Weiner =

American photojournalist

Dan Weiner (1919–1959) was an American photojournalist, working largely for Fortune magazine. Weiner specialized in photographs of America at work.

== Life and work ==
He was born in New York City. He studied painting at the Art Students League and the Pratt Institute, and eventually turned to photography, becoming a member of the Photo League.

Weiner served in the Army Air Forces during World War II, and became a professional photojournalist after the war who worked largely for Fortune magazine. He made street photographs of mid-20th-century New York City.

He died in a plane crash in Kentucky, aged 39. The plane, piloted by the subject of one of his stories, collided with the side of a mountain during a freak snowstorm.

He was married to Sandra Weiner, whom he met through the Photo League as her teacher.

== Publications ==
- Capa, Cornell, ed. (1968). The Concerned Photographer. New York: Grossman. With photographs by Weiner, Werner Bischof, André Kertész, Robert Capa, Leonard Freed, and David Seymour.
- Capa, Cornell, ed. (1974). Dan Weiner. ICP Library of Photographers, vol. 5. New York: Grossman. ISBN 0670256455; ISBN 0670256463.
- Ewing, William A. (1989). America Worked: The 1950s Photographs of Dan Weiner. New York: Harry N. Abrams. ISBN 0810911779.
- Paton, Alan (1956). South Africa in Transition. New York: Scribner. Photographs by Weiner.

== Collections ==
Weiner's work is held in the following permanent collection:

- Metropolitan Museum of Art, New York: 15 prints (as of August 2020)
