= Marynn Older Ausubel =

American photographer (1912–1980)

- Born: 1912; New Haven, Connecticut
- Died: 1980 (aged 67–68)
- Occupation: Photographer

Marynn Older Ausubel (1912–1980) was an American photographer.

Ausubel was born in New Haven, Connecticut. She was a member of the New York Photo League from 1938. Her work was included in the 2009 exhibition The Women of the Photo League at Higher Pictures Gallery, New York. Ausubel died in Orlando, Florida.

Her work is included in the collections of the Museum of Fine Arts Houston, the Jewish Museum, New York and the Columbus Museum of Art.
