= Louis Stettner =

American photographer

Louis Stettner (November 7, 1922 – October 13, 2016) was an American photographer of the 20th century whose work included streetscapes, portraits and architectural images of New York and Paris. His work has been highly regarded because of its humanity and capturing the life and reality of the people and streets. Starting in 1947, Stettner photographed the changes in the people, culture, and architecture of both cities. He continued to photograph New York and Paris up until his death.

Louis Stettner’s works are posthumously managed by the Louis Stettner Estate.

== Early life ==
Louis Stettner was born in Brooklyn, New York, where he was one of four children, the identical twin of his brother Irving. His father was a cabinet maker, and Louis learned the trade when young, using the money he earned to support his growing love of photography. He was given a box camera as a child, and his love affair with photography began. His family went on trips to Manhattan and visited museums, including the Metropolitan Museum of Art, where his love of art began.

At 18, in 1940, Stettner enlisted in the United States army and became a combat photographer in Europe for the Signal Corps. After a brief stint in Europe he was sent to New Guinea, the Philippines, and Japan.

== Career ==
Back from the war Stettner joined the Photo League in New York. Stettner visited Paris in 1946 and in 1947 moved there. From 1947 to 1949 he studied at the Institut des hautes études cinématographiques (IDHEC) in Paris and received a Bachelor of Arts in Photography & Cinema. He went back and forth between New York and Paris for almost two decades and finally settled permanently in Saint-Ouen, near Paris, in 1990. Stettner still frequently returned to New York.

Stettner's professional work in Paris began with capturing life in the post-war recovery. He captured the everyday lives of his subjects. In the tradition of the Photo League, he wanted to investigate the bonds that connect people to one another. In 1947 he was asked by the same Photo League to organize an exhibition of French photographers in New York. He gathered the works of some of the greatest photographers of the era, including Doisneau, Brassaï, Boubat, Izis, and Ronis. The show was a big success and was largely reviewed in the annual issue of U.S. Camera. Stettner had begun a series of regular meetings with Brassaï who was a great mentor and had significant influence on his work. In 1949, Stettner had his first exhibition at the "Salon des Indépendants" at the Bibliothèque Nationale, Paris.

In 1951 his work was included in the famous Subjektive Fotografie exhibition in Germany.During the 1950s he free-lanced for Time, Life, Fortune, and Du (Germany). While in Paris he reconnected with Paul Strand, who had also left New York because of the political intolerance of the McCarthy era—Strand had been a founder of the Photo League that would be blacklisted and then banned during those years.

In the 1970s Stettner spent more time in New York City, where he taught at Brooklyn College, Queens College, and Cooper Union.

== Independent work ==
In his own work, Stettner focused on documenting the lives of ordinary people in both Paris and New York. He felt that the cities belong to the people who live there, not to tourists or visitors. His upbringing caused him to take great care in capturing the simple human dignity of the working class. He also captured noteworthy architectural images of both cities, including bridges, buildings, and monuments.

The subjects and series included:

- New York 1946 to present
- Penn Station
- The Subways
- Wall Street
- Brooklyn Bridge
- The Seine
- The Bowery
- The Workers
- Early Paris

Stettner produced well-known images, including: Aubervilliers, Brooklyn Promenade, Twin Towers with Sea Gull, Penn Station, and the Statue of Liberty, Battery Park.

In his nineties, Stettner turned to a large format camera of the dimensions used by his hero, Paul Strand; an 8×10 Deardorff in order to photograph details of the landscape of Les Alpilles in Provence where Van Gogh often painted, assisted by his wife Janet.

== Awards ==
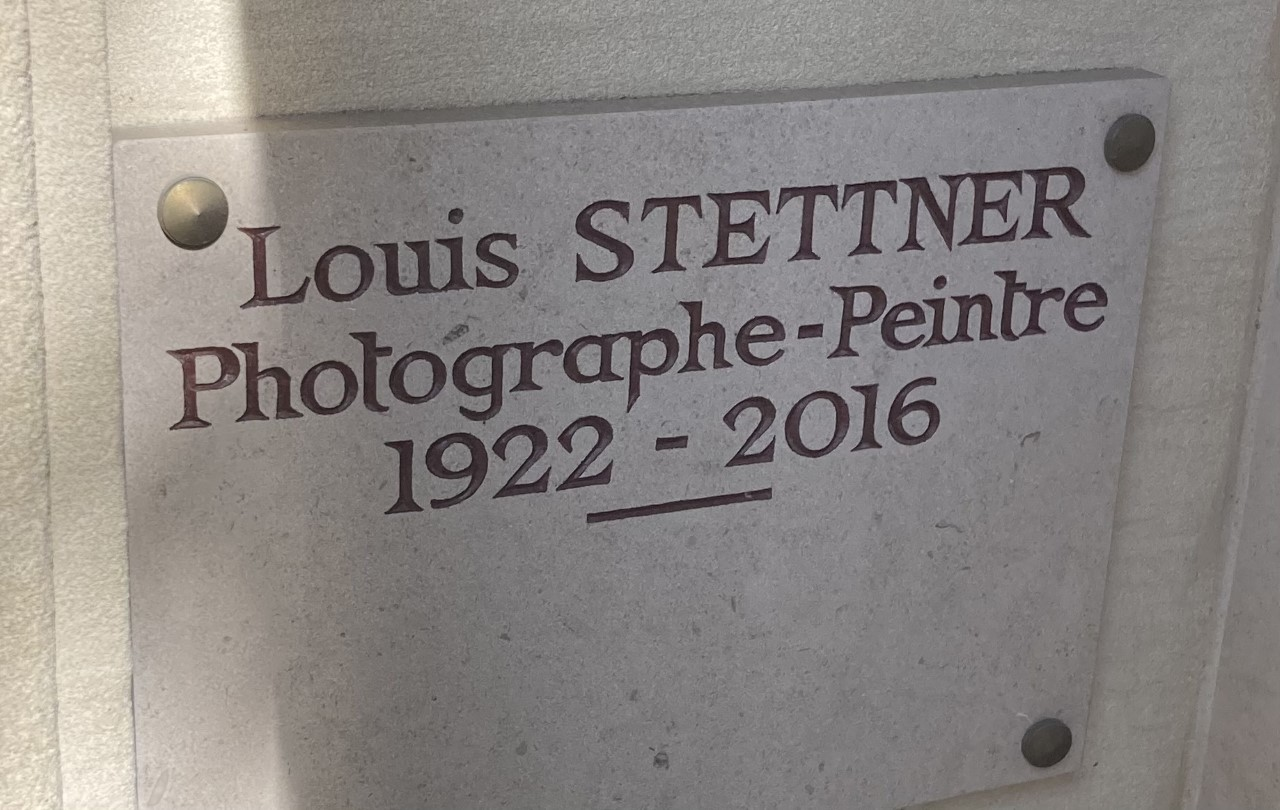
Montmartre Cemetery.

Stettner received numerous honors, and in 1950 he was named Life's top new photographer. In 1975 he won First Prize in the Pravda World Contest.

== Museums containing work by Stettner ==
- Addison Gallery of American Art, Phillips Academy, Andover, MA
- Akron Art Museum, Akron, OH
- Art Institute of Chicago, Chicago
- Bibliothèque historique de la ville de Paris
- Bibliothèque Nationale de France, Paris
- Brooklyn Museum of Art, Brooklyn
- Cleveland Museum of Art, Cleveland
- International Center of Photography, New York
- Jewish Museum Berlin
- Los Angeles County Museum of Art - LACMA, Los Angeles
- Maison Européenne de la Photographie, Paris
- Merrill Lynch Art Collection, New York
- Metropolitan Museum of Art, New York
- Microsoft Art Collection, Seattle
- Montana Museum of Art and Culture, Missoula, MT
- Carnavalet Museum, Paris
- Museum of Fine Arts, Boston
- Musée de l'Élysée, Lausanne
- Musée de l'Elysee, Paris
- Museum of Modern Art, New York
- Museum of the City of New York
- New Britain Museum of American Art New Britain, Connecticut
- New York Public Library, New York
- San Francisco Museum of Art, San Francisco
- San Francisco Museum of Modern Art, San Francisco
- Smithsonian Institution, Washington, DC
- Victoria and Albert Museum, London
- Whitney Museum of Art, New York

== Select exhibitions ==
- Louis Stettner, Limelight Gallery, August 17-September 27 1954
- What's New: Recent Acquisitions in Photography. Whitney Museum of American Art, New York, 2001
- Star Spangled Spirit. Bonni Benrubi Gallery, New York, 2002
- City Streets. Samuel P. Harn Museum of Art, Gainesville, Fla, 2003
- Photographies récentes par Louis Stettner. Galerie Marion Meyer, Paris, 2003
- Full House: Views from the Whitney's Collection at 75. Whitney Museum of American Art, New York, 2006
- Bonni Benrubi Gallery, New York, 2006
- Louis Stettner: Photographien. Camera Work, Berlin, 2006
- Louis Stettner: Streetwise. Bonni Benrubi Gallery, New York, 2006
- Fotografía Contemporánea. Museo Nacional de Bellas Artes, Santiago, 2006

== Selected books and portfolios ==
- Paris-New York. Paris, New York: Two Cities Publications, 1949. Portfolio of 10 photographs, introduction by Brassaï.
- Workers: Twenty-Four Photographs. New York: Stettner Studio, 1974. Portfolio.
- Women. New York: Stettner Studio, 1976. Portfolio of 22 photographs.
- Sur le Tas. Paris: Cercle d'Art, 1979. ISBN 2-7022-0129-6. Book of 156 photographs, introduction by François Cavanna. (in French)
- Early Joys: Photographs from 1947-1972. New York: Janet Iffland, 1987. ISBN 0-9618482-0-0. Introduction by Brassaï.
- Louis Stettner: New York, 1994. Kempen, New York: Te Neues; Paris, Flammarion, 1993. ISBN 3-8238-1443-5.
- Sous le ciel de Paris. Paris: Parigramme, 1994. ISBN 2-84096-193-8. Introduction by François Cavanna. (in French)
- Louis Stettner's New York, 1950s–1990s. New York: Rizzoli, 1997. ISBN 0-8478-2004-1, 9780847820047.
- Louis Stettner: American photographer, Paris: Suermondt-Ludwig-Museum Aachen, 11. Januar-9. März 1997. Aachen: Museum der Stadt Aachen, Suermondt-Ludwig Museum, 1997. ISBN 3-929203-15-4. (in German)
- Louis Stettner. Collection Photo Poche. Paris: Nathan, 1998. ISBN 2-09-754126-7. Introduction by François Bernheim. (in French)
- Louis Stettner: Wisdom Cries Out in the Streets. Paris: Flammarion, 1999. ISBN 2-08-013673-9.
- Louis Stettner: Sophisme, photographies 1990–1999. Neuchâtel: Ides et Callendes, 1999. Text by Michèle Auer. (in French)
- Chile en el corazón. Santiago: LOM, 2001. ISBN 956-282-394-6. (in Spanish)

== Selected essays and books by Louis Stettner ==
- De "l'objectivité nouvelle" à la "photographie subjective". Antwerp: Gevaert, 1953. (in French)
- 35 mm Photography, editor. U.S. Camera Co., 1956.
- History of the Nude in American Photography, editor. New York: Fawcett, 1966.
- Weegee the Famous, editor. New York: Knopf, 1978.
- "Cézanne's Apple and the Photo League," Aperture, no. 112 (Fall 1988), pp. 14–35
