= Weegee =

American photographer and photojournalist (1899–1968)

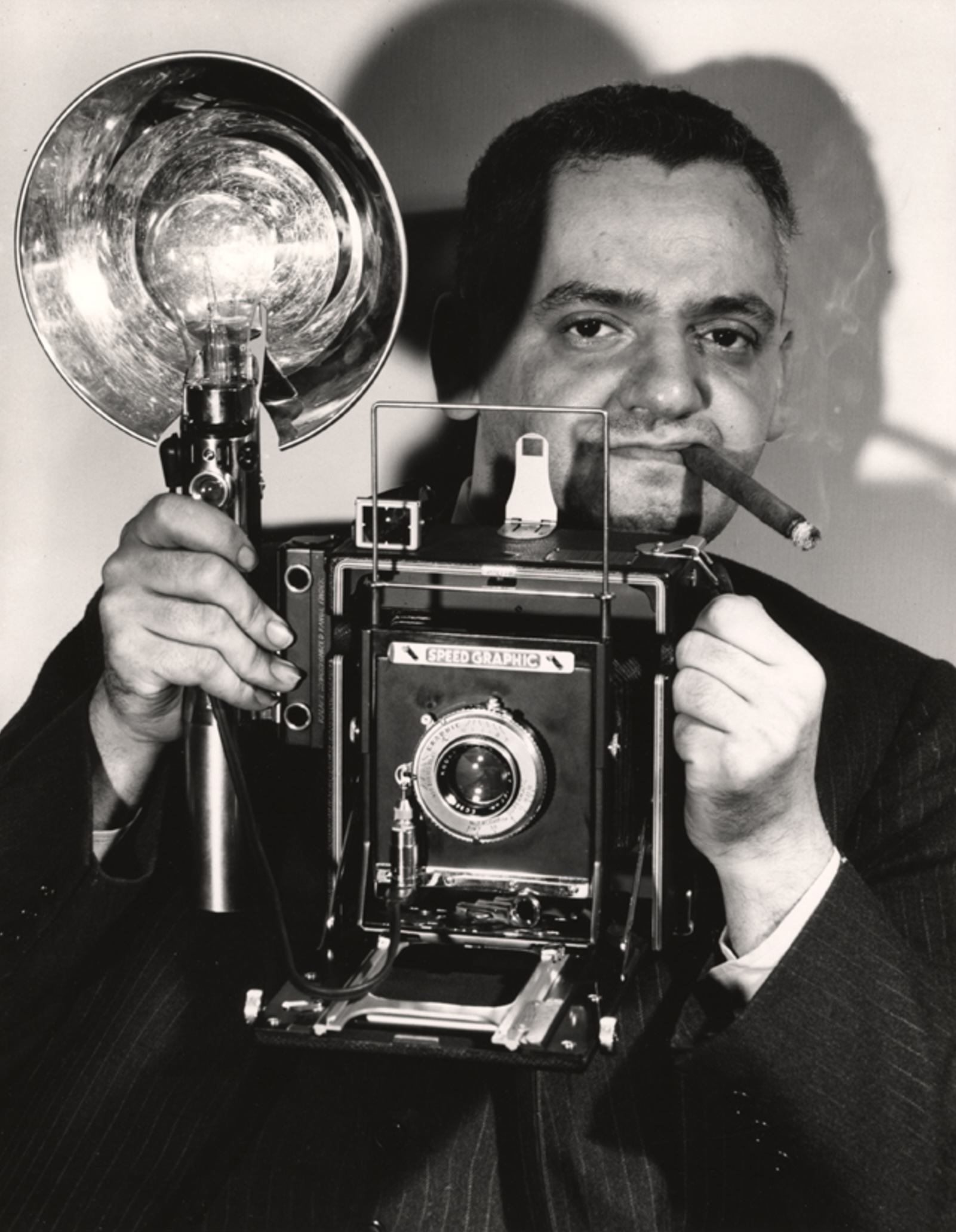
- Weegee in 1945
- Born: Ascher Fellig; June 12, 1899; Złoczów, Austrian Galicia, Austro-Hungarian Empire (now Zolochiv, Ukraine)
- Died: December 26, 1968 (aged 69); New York City, U.S.
- Other names: Arthur Fellig, Usher Fellig
- Occupation: Photographer
- Known for: Street photography of crime scenes or emergencies

Arthur Fellig (born Ascher Fellig; June 12, 1899 – December 26, 1968), known by his pseudonym Weegee, was a photographer and photojournalist, known for his stark black and white street photography in New York City.

Weegee worked in Manhattan's Lower East Side as a press photographer during the 1930s and 1940s and developed his signature style by following the city's emergency services and documenting their activity. Much of his work depicted unflinchingly realistic scenes of urban life, crime, injury and death. Weegee published photographic books and also worked in cinema, initially making his own short films and later collaborating with film directors such as Jack Donohue and Stanley Kubrick.

== Personal life ==
Weegee was born Ascher (later modified to Usher) Fellig in Złoczów (now Zolochiv, Ukraine), near Lemberg in Galicia and Lodomeria, a region of the Austro-Hungarian Empire. His given name was changed to Arthur after he immigrated with his Jewish family to New York in 1909. The father of the family, Bernard Fellig, emigrated in 1908, followed in 1909 by his wife and their four children, including "Usher Felik", as his name was spelled on the steerage passenger list of the steamship, Kaiserin Auguste Victoria. In Brooklyn, where they settled, he took numerous odd jobs, including working as a street photographer of children on his pony and as an assistant to a commercial photographer. In 1924 he was hired as a darkroom technician by Acme Newspictures (later United Press International Photos). He left Acme in 1935 to become a freelance photographer. Describing his beginnings, Weegee stated:

In my particular case I didn't wait 'til somebody gave me a job or something, I went and created a job for myself—freelance photographer. And what I did, anybody else can do. What I did simply was this: I went down to Manhattan Police Headquarters and for two years I worked without a police card or any kind of credentials. When a story came over a police teletype, I would go to it. The idea was I sold the pictures to the newspapers. And naturally, I picked a story that meant something.

He worked at night and competed with the police to be first at the scene of a crime, selling his photographs to tabloids and photographic agencies. His photographs, centered on Manhattan police headquarters, were soon published by the Daily News and other tabloids, as well as more upscale publications such as Life magazine.

In 1957, after developing diabetes, he moved in with Wilma Wilcox, a Quaker social worker whom he had known since the 1940s, and who cared for him and then cared for his work. He traveled extensively in Europe until 1964, working for the London Daily Mirror and on a variety of photography, film, lecture, and book projects. On December 26, 1968, Weegee died in New York at the age of 69.

== Pseudonym ==
The origin of Fellig's pseudonym is uncertain. One of his earliest jobs was in the photo lab of The New York Times, where (in a reference to the tool used to wipe down prints) he was nicknamed "squeegee boy". Later, during his employment with Acme Newspictures, his skill and ingenuity in developing prints on the run (e.g., in a subway car) earned him the name "Mr. Squeegee". He may subsequently have been dubbed "Weegee"—a phonetic rendering of Ouija—because his instant and seemingly prescient arrivals at scenes of crimes or other emergencies seemed as magical as a Ouija board.

== Photographic career ==
=== Photographic technique ===
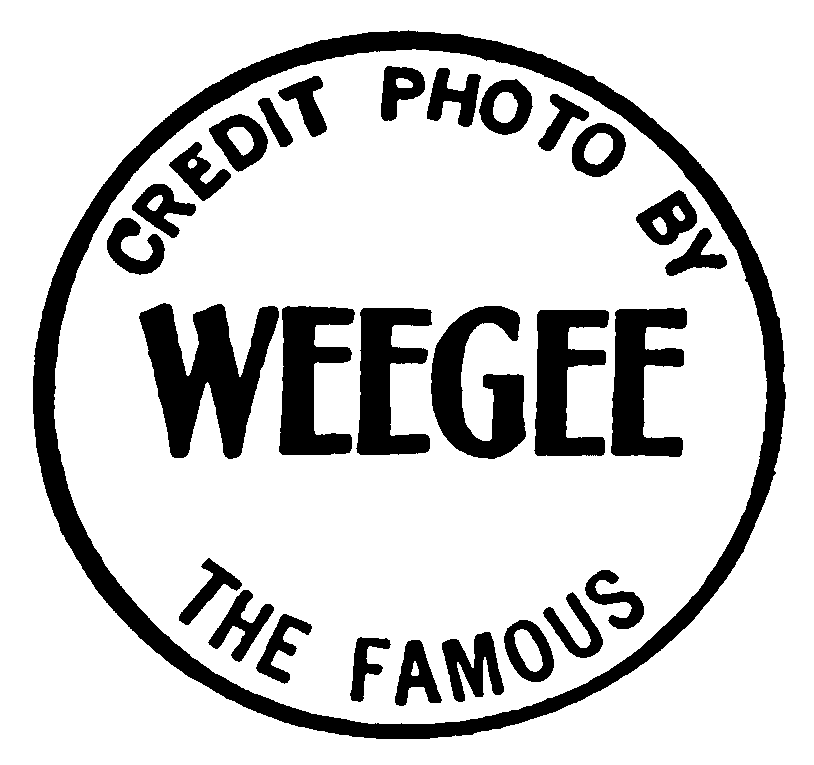
Weegee's rubber stamp for signing his pictures

Most of his notable photographs were taken with very basic press photographer equipment and methods of the era, a 4×5 Speed Graphic camera preset at f/16 at 1/200 of a second, with flashbulbs and a set focus distance of ten feet. He was a self-taught photographer with no formal training. He is often said—incorrectly—to have developed his photographs in a makeshift darkroom in the trunk of his car. While Fellig would shoot a variety of subjects and individuals, he also had a sense of what sold best:

Names make news. There's a fight between a drunken couple on Third Avenue or Ninth Avenue in Hell's Kitchen, nobody cares. It's just a barroom brawl. But if society has a fight in a Cadillac on Park Avenue and their names are in the Social Register, this makes news and the papers are interested in that.

Weegee is spuriously credited for answering "f/8 and be there" when asked about his photographic technique. Whether or not he actually said it, the saying has become so widespread in photographic circles as to have become a cliché. Yet other sources, in mentioning his standard technique (f/16, Pressbulb25, focus at 10'), illustrate the probable fiction behind the mention of 'f/8'. A book written about Weegee, Weegee's Secrets published in 1953, says:

For the record, Weegee shot the majority of his photos from 6-feet at f/22 and 10-feet at f16. These smaller f/stops provided excellent depth of field. When hunting for photos, Weegee would stalk the streets with his camera set to 10-feet and f/16. This distance was useful for shooting people full-length. He also carried a flashlight for adjusting his camera settings in the dark.

Some of Weegee's photos, like the juxtaposition of society grandes dames in ermines and tiaras and a glowering street woman at the Metropolitan Opera (The Critic, 1943), were later revealed to have been staged.

=== Late 1930s to mid-1940s ===
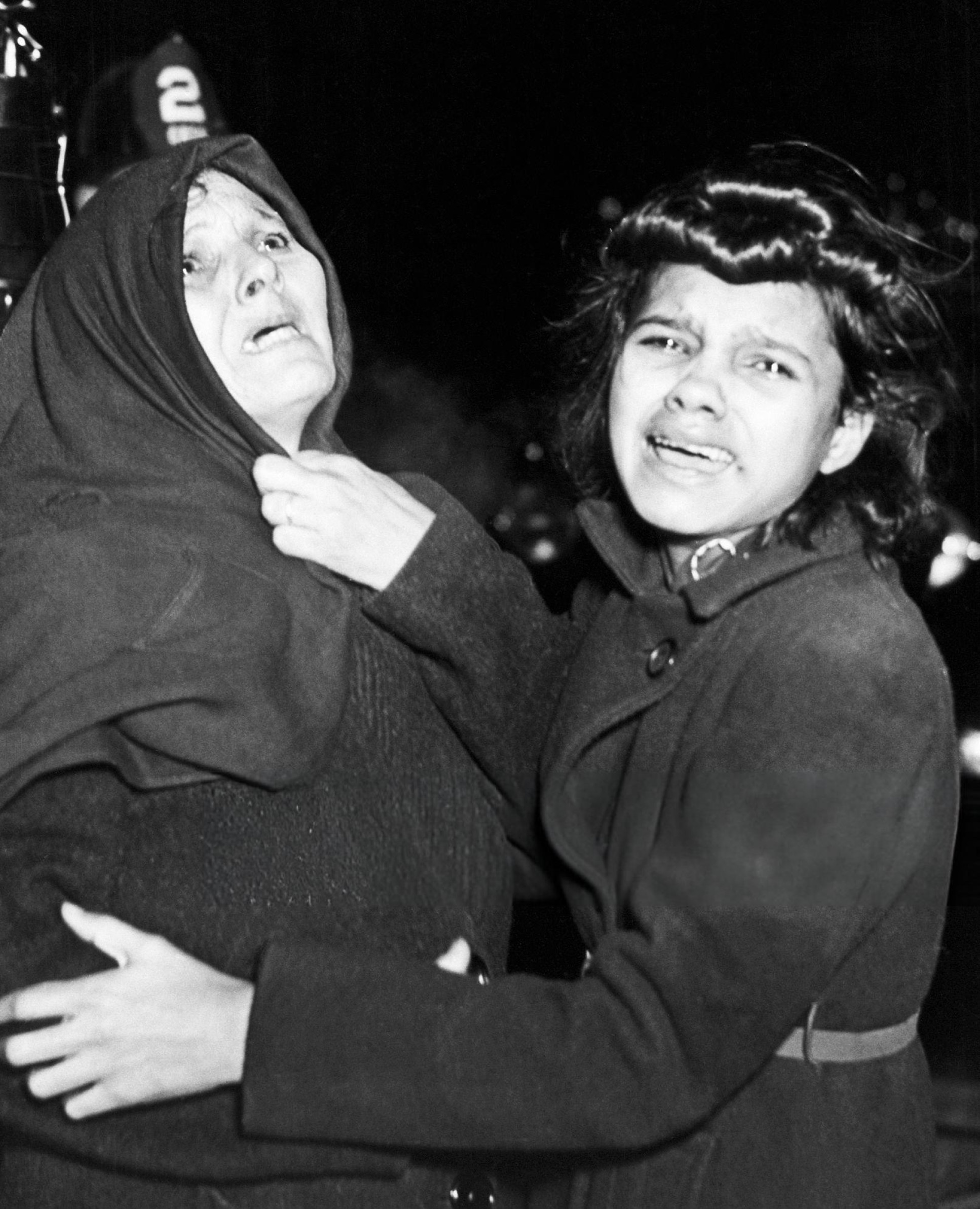
"I cried when I took this picture", as said by Weegee, depicts a mother and daughter weeping over their other daughter and her young baby being burned to death on the top floor of a tenement, in 1939.

In 1938, Fellig became the only New York freelance newspaper photographer with a permit to have a portable police-band shortwave radio. Weegee worked mostly at night; he listened closely to broadcasts and often beat authorities to the scene.

Five of his photographs were acquired by the Museum of Modern Art (MoMA) in 1943. These works were included in its exhibition Action Photography. He was later included in "50 Photographs by 50 Photographers", another MoMA show organized by photographer Edward Steichen, and he lectured at the New School for Social Research. Advertising and editorial assignments for magazines followed, including Life and beginning in 1945, Vogue.

Naked City (1945) was his first book of photographs. Film producer Mark Hellinger bought the rights to the title from Weegee. In 1948, Weegee's aesthetic formed the foundation for Hellinger's film The Naked City. It was based on a gritty 1948 story written by Malvin Wald about the investigation into a model's murder in New York. Wald was nominated for an Academy Award for his screenplay, co-written with screenwriter Albert Maltz, who would later be blacklisted in the McCarthy era. Later the title was used again for a naturalistic television police drama series, and in the 1980s, it was adopted by a band, Naked City, led by the New York experimental musician John Zorn.

According to the commentary by director Robert Wise, Weegee appeared in the 1949 film The Set-Up, ringing the bell at the boxing match.

=== 1950s and 1960s ===
Weegee experimented with 16 mm filmmaking himself beginning in 1941 and worked in the Hollywood industry from 1946 to the early 1960s, as an actor and a consultant. He was an uncredited special effects consultant and credited stills photographer for Stanley Kubrick's 1964 film Dr. Strangelove or: How I Learned to Stop Worrying and Love the Bomb. His accent was one of the influences for the accent of the title character in the film, played by Peter Sellers.

In the 1950s and 1960s, Weegee experimented with panoramic photographs, photo distortions and photography through prisms. Using a plastic lens, he made a famous photograph of Marilyn Monroe in which her face is grotesquely distorted yet still recognizable. For the 1950 movie The Yellow Cab Man, Weegee contributed a sequence in which automobile traffic is wildly distorted. He is credited for this as "Luigi" in the film's opening titles. He also traveled widely in Europe in the 1960s, where he photographed nude subjects. In London he befriended pornographer Harrison Marks and the model Pamela Green, whom he photographed.

In the early 1960s, Fellig developed an interest in nudist and "nudie-cutie" films. He made a cameo and was credited with trick photography for the American nudist comedy Shangri-La (1961) and later appeared in the British feature My Bare Lady (1963).

In 1966, Weegee starred as himself in a "Nudie Cutie" exploitation film, intended to be a pseudo-documentary of his life. Called The 'Imp'probable Mr. Wee Gee, it saw Fellig apparently falling in love with a shop-window dummy that he follows to Paris, all the while pursuing or photographing various women.

== Legacy ==
Weegee can be seen as the American counterpart to Brassaï, who photographed Paris street scenes at night. Weegee's themes of nudists, circus performers, freaks and street people were later taken up and developed by Diane Arbus in the early 1960s.

In 1980, Weegee's companion Wilma Wilcox, along with Sidney Kaplan, Aaron Rose and Larry Silver, formed The Weegee Portfolio Incorporated to create an exclusive collection of photographic prints made from Weegee's original negatives. As a bequest, Wilma Wilcox donated the entire Weegee archive – 16,000 photographs and 7,000 negatives – to the International Center of Photography in New York. This 1993 gift and transfer of copyright became the source for several exhibitions and books including Weegee's World, edited by Miles Barth (1997), and Unknown Weegee, edited by Cynthia Young (2006). The first and largest exhibition was the 329-image Weegee's World: Life, Death and the Human Drama, mounted in 1997. It was followed in 2002 by Weegee's Trick Photography, a show of distorted or otherwise caricatured images, and four years later by Unknown Weegee, a survey that emphasized his less violent, post-tabloid photographs.

In 1993, director Sherman Price revisited the film, The Imp’probable Mr. Wee Gee, to create the documentary The Real WeeGee. It intercut footage from the 1966 project with Fellig's crime photography.

In 2009, the Kunsthalle Vienna held an exhibition called Elevator to the Gallows. The exhibition combined modern installations by Banks Violette with Weegee's nocturnal photography.

In 2012, ICP opened another Weegee exhibition titled, Murder Is My Business. Also in 2012, an exhibition called Weegee: The Naked City, opened at Multimedia Art Museum, Moscow. Weegee's autobiography, originally published in 1961 as Weegee by Weegee and long out of print, was retitled as Weegee: The Autobiography and republished in 2013.

From April 2013 through July 2014, the Flatz Museum in Dornbirn, Austria presented Weegee. How to photograph a corpse, based on relevant photographs from Weegee's portfolio, including many vintage prints. Original newspapers and magazines, dating back to the time where the photos were taken, accompanied the photographs.

In 2025, ICP mounted Weegee: Society of the Spectacle.

== In popular culture ==
- The 1992 film The Public Eye is loosely based on Weegee, and some of the photos used in the film were taken by Fellig.
- The season 6 The X-Files episode "Tithonus", written by Vince Gilligan, was inspired by Fellig.
- The 2014 film Nightcrawler was also inspired by Weegee.
- The 2025 film Blue Moon features Weegee as a character, played by John Doran
- In the 2025 miniseries Monster: The Ed Gein Story, Elliott Gould plays Weegee.

== Public collections ==
- Art Institute of Chicago, Chicago, IL
- Museum of Modern Art, New York
- The Jewish Museum
- Rijksmuseum Amsterdam
- International Center of Photography

== See also ==
- The Public Eye – Filmmaker Howard Franklin was unable to secure the rights to Fellig's life story, so he created a fictionalized version.
- Ƒ/8 and be there
