= Sid Grossman =

American photographer, teacher, and activist

- Born: June 25, 1913; New York City, New York, U.S.A
- Died: December 31, 1955 (aged 42); New York City, New York
- Education: City College of New York
- Occupations: photographer, teacher, and social activist
- Known for: Founding the Photo League
- Spouse(s): Marion Hille and Miriam Grossman

Sid Grossman (June 25, 1913 in Manhattan – December 31, 1955, in Provincetown) was an American photographer, teacher, and social activist.

== Life ==
Sid Grossman was the younger son of Morris and Ethel Grossman. He attended the City College of New York and worked on a WPA street crew. In 1934, he started what would become the Photo League with co-founder Sol Libsohn. Grossman played numerous roles throughout the Photo League's existence (1936–1951) including educator, administrator, reviewer, editor of Photo Notes and founder of Chelsea Document (1938-1940), an indictment of obsolete buildings and substandard living conditions in a New York neighborhood. He enlisted on March 6, 1943, and served in the Sixth Army in Panama during World War II. Grossman's 1940 photographs of labor union activity led to FBI investigations and the blacklisting of the Photo League as a communist front in 1947. In 1949, he opened a photography school in Provincetown, Massachusetts, although he continued to live and teach in NYC part of every year. Grossman was married twice: to Marion Hille and then to Miriam Grossman.

Grossman died from a heart attack in 1955. His book, Journey to the Cape, coauthored with Millard Lampell, was published posthumously in 1959.

== Politics and aesthetics ==
Even though the actual date of his joining the Communist Party is not known, his membership in it was never in doubt. In 1936, his nickname at the Photo League was "Commissar" for his dogmatic opposition to the aestheticism of some of the members. Prior to his enlistment in the Armed Forces, he was investigated by the FBI, U.S. Army Intelligence, and the NYC Police Department for his political affiliations.

However, by 1946 and his discharge from the armed forces, Grossman was ready to break from Stalinism and the Communist Party. As Mason Klein observed, “Grossman's major formal breakthrough occurred when he was in the Air Force, stationed in Panama...” There he was away from the Party and the day-to-day affairs of The Photo League, and he used the opportunity “to experiment and move on.” He “began to challenge the honest and straight documentary approach that he had long espoused.” He began using a Speed Graphic 4x5 camera and changed his technique. He started to photograph at night and worked to achieve startling effects by moving his camera and manipulating his prints. Grossman's photographic point of view and the images he created in the late 1940s bore little if any resemblance to those of the “Commissar” of the early 1930s. None of which had any bearing on the decisions of U.S. Attorney General Tom C. Clark and House Un-American Activities Committee to deem the photographer and the organization he helped to create as “subversive.” Grossman resigned from the Photo League in 1949; the Photo League disbanded on October 30, 1951.

== Photography ==
Grossman conducted workshops at the Photo League, the Henry St. Settlement, and the Harlem Art Center, and privately in NYC and Provincetown, for almost twenty years. The photographers he taught were many – including Lou Bernstein, Lisette Model, Walter Rosenblum, Louis Stettner, Helen Gee, Arthur Leipzig (who is on record as calling Grossman “probably the most fantastic teacher I ever knew”) and Leon Levinstein. Yet Grossman himself said, “I am not an instructor in any classical sense.” He insisted that his students take on the responsibility for making something of themselves. According to Jewish Museum curator Mason Klein, “Grossman increasingly insisted on the idea of being in the world in a particular manner, engaging with a certain consciousness as a photographer, and connecting to the camera in ways that made photographers question who they were.” One had to “live for photography,” in effect transforming and liberating oneself, in order to become a good photographer.

One description of Grossman's “impassioned, often aggressive workshop critiques” has been provided by one of his students, N. Jay Jaffee, who studied with him in 1948.. On the one hand, “He was almost contemptuous; each of us got a taste of his anger and hostility during the course.” Yet, “His genius was in expounding a philosophy of photography that was unique. I had never heard anyone speak on a subject with such depth and enthusiasm. I still recall a phrase he repeated several times: 'The world is a picture.' This simple statement was a profound insight into the method and meaning of photography.” “To Sid, photography was serious, not sacred.” Grossman's first wife, Marion Hille, remarked that he “encouraged his students 'to enjoy themselves right away, to get a feel of taking pictures without technique getting in the way.'”

Jaffee reflected that, “Perhaps, if Sid had lived long enough, he would have also mellowed. Hopefully, he would have received the honor and respect for his brilliance and his work that he so justly deserves.” Today, almost all of the important photographers and educators he influenced and who continued his legacy are also deceased. All that is left are the photographs he and they made—a considerable contribution."

== Publication ==
- The Life and Work of Sid Grossman. By Keith F. Davis. New York City: Howard Greenberg Library; Göttingen: Steidl, 2017. ISBN 978-3958291256.
