= Burleigh =

Burleigh may refer to:

== Places ==
=== Australia ===
- Burleigh Heads, Queensland, a suburb of Gold Coast, Queensland
- Burleigh Head National Park
- Electoral district of Burleigh, Queensland, Australia

=== Canada ===
- Burleigh Falls, Ontario

=== United Kingdom ===
- Burleigh, Berkshire, Bracknell Forest, England
- Burleigh, Gloucestershire, England
- Burleigh, Perth and Kinross, Scotland
  - Burleigh Castle, is located at the above
- Burleigh Hall, house near the site of the present Loughborough University
- Burleigh Fields, house near Loughborough
- Burleigh House, London

=== United States ===
- Burleigh (Ellicott City, Maryland), listed on the NRHP in Maryland
- Burleigh Township, Michigan
- Burleigh, New Jersey
- Burleigh (Concord, North Carolina), listed on the NRHP in North Carolina
- Burleigh County, North Dakota
- Menoken, North Dakota, also known as Burleigh or Burleigh Station

== People with the surname ==
- A. A. Burleigh (c. 1845–1938) also known as Angus A. Burleigh, American minister, soldier, and educator
- Averil Burleigh (1883–1949), British painter
- Bennet Burleigh, British journalist
- Celia M. Burleigh, American activist for women's rights
- Charles Burleigh (1810 – 1878), American orator and abolitionist
- Edwin Chick Burleigh (1843-1916), American politician
- Harry Burleigh, African-American composer
- James Burleigh (1869-1917), English footballer
- Michael Burleigh, British author and historian
- Nina Burleigh, American author and journalist
- Patrick Burleigh, American screenwriter, playwright, and essayist
- Peter Burleigh (born 1942), American diplomat and South Asia specialist
- Walter Atwood Burleigh (1820-1896), American physician
- William Burleigh (1785–1827), American politician

== Other uses ==
- Burleigh Pottery, Stoke-on-Trent

== See also ==
- Birley (disambiguation)
- Burley (disambiguation)
- Burghley (disambiguation)
- Berlei
- Burly
