= Burley =

Burley may refer to:

== People ==
- Burley (surname)
- Burley Mitchell, chief justice of the North Carolina Supreme Court

== Places ==
=== England ===
- Burley, Hampshire, a village and civil parish
- Burley, Leeds, an inner city area of Leeds
- Burley, Rutland, a village and civil parish
- Burley, Shropshire, a location
- Burley in Wharfedale, West Yorkshire, England, a village and civil parish

=== United States ===
- Burley, Idaho, a city
- Burley Manor, listed on the National Register of Historic Places in Maryland
- Burley, Washington, a census-designated place
- Burley school, Chicago, a chicago public school

== Other uses ==
- Burley (tobacco), grown primarily in central Kentucky and central Tennessee
- Chumming (burley or berley in Australasia), the practice of luring various animals, usually pelagic predatory fish, by throwing meat-based groundbaits into the water
- Burley Design, an American company
- Re Burley, a Canadian court decision

== See also ==
- Burley Woodhead, a hamlet in West Yorkshire, England
- Burley-Sekem, a brand of leather ball
- Birley (disambiguation)
- Burghley (disambiguation)
- Burleigh (disambiguation)
- Berlei
- Burly
