= Birley (disambiguation) =

Birley is an electoral ward in the city of Sheffield, England.

Birley may also refer to:

- Birley, Herefordshire, a village in Herefordshire, England
- Birley (surname), a common English surname, includes a list of people named Birley
- Birley Collieries, coal mines in Sheffield, England
- Birley Community College, a secondary school and technology college in Birley, Sheffield
- Birley Spa, a community bath hall in Sheffield, England

== See also ==
- Burley (disambiguation)
- Burghley (disambiguation)
- Burleigh (disambiguation)
- Berlei
- Burly
