= Burghley =

Burghley may refer to:

- William Cecil, 1st Baron Burghley (1520–1598), chief minister of Queen Elizabeth I of England
- Burghley House, a sixteenth-century country house in Cambridgeshire, built for the above
- Burghley Horse Trials, an annual three-day event
- Burghley, an abandoned English village, believed to be under Burghley House
- David Cecil, 6th Marquess of Exeter, also known as David Burghley, British Conservative politician and 1928 Summer Olympics 400m hurdles champion
- Berdly, a character from Deltarune whose name is mispronounced as "Burghley" in a cutscene in Chapter 2

== See also ==
- Berlei
- Burly
- Birley (disambiguation)
- Burleigh (disambiguation)
- Burley (disambiguation)
- Berdly (disambiguation)
