= Berdly (disambiguation) =

Berdly is a character from the video game Deltarune.

Berdly may refer to:

- "Berdly", a 2021 track by Toby Fox from Deltarune Chapter 2 OST from the video game Deltarune
- "Berdly (Rejected Concept)", a 2021 track by Toby Fox from Deltarune Chapter 2 OST from the video game Deltarune

== See also ==
- Bewdley (disambiguation)
- Burghley (disambiguation)
