= Tavistock Street =

Street in the Covent Garden area of Westminster

Coordinates: 51.5122°N 0.1202°W

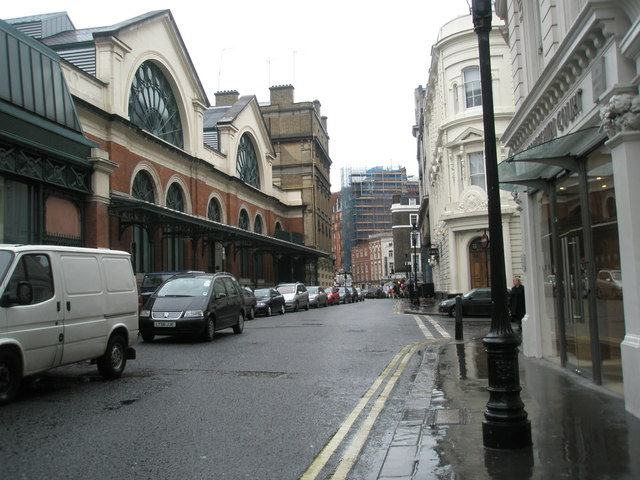
Tavistock Street

Tavistock Street is a street in the Covent Garden area of Westminster which runs parallel to the Strand between Drury Lane and Southampton Street just south of the market piazza.

== History ==
Initially, the street was a passageway between Wellington and Catherine Streets in 1630s. The first mention of the street dates to 1706, until when it was part of York Street. In 1729 Caleb Waterfield erected his first house (no. 15) on the street. In 1733 James Walker built three more, and the same year Robert Umpleby built two more (becoming nos. 34–38).

In the early 19th century, the street was the location of many fashionable shops, such as are now to be found in Bond Street. The congregation of rich carriages there was said to be one of the great sights of London at this time. It then became a centre of publishing of periodicals such as Country Life (no 8, designed in 1904 by Edwin Lutyens), The Stage and Vanity Fair. The auction business Sotheby's started there as a bookseller.

== Famous residents ==
Thomas de Quincey lived at number 36 where he wrote Confessions of an English Opium Eater.

Casanova took rooms at the Star Tavern in 1763 but was unsuccessful in seducing English women there.

Hannah Glasse, the author of The Art of Cookery Made Plain and Easy, lived there from 1747 to 1757.

== Buildings ==
Number 22 is the former headquarters of the Strand District Board of Works. The seal of the board is visible on the exterior of the building.

Museum software company System Simulation was based in Burleigh House at no. 28.
