= Bubley =

Bubley is a surname. Notable people with the surname include:

- Ernest Bubley (1913–1996), English table tennis player
- Esther Bubley (1921–1998), American photojournalist and documentary photographer
- Erin Heatherton (born Bubley in 1989), American fashion model and actress

== See also ==
- Burley (surname)
