= Burley (surname) =

Burley is a surname. Notable people with the surname include:

- Adam Burley, medieval English logician
- Aidan Burley, New Zealand-born English politician
- Charley Burley, American boxer
- Craig Burley, Scottish footballer
- Fulton Burley, Irish-Canadian musician known for his work for Disney
- George Burley, Scottish footballer and manager
- Gillian Beer (born Burley), British literary critic
- Ingrid Burley, American rapper and singer
- Jane Burley, Scottish field hockey midfielder
- Jos Burley, member of New Zealand's women's cricket team
- Joseph Leonard Burley, founder of the Burley Football Company
- Kay Burley, English television newscaster
- Nancy Burley (1930–2013), Australian figure skater
- Nick Burley, American boxer
- Robert Burley, Canadian photographer
- Siaha Burley, American arena football player
- Simon de Burley, English knight, court official, and childhood friend of Richard II
- W. J. Burley, author of the Wycliffe detective novels
- Walter Burley, medieval English logician
