= Baimbetovo =

Baimbetovo Баимбетово
- Village
- Location within Bashkortostan Location within Russia
- Coordinates: 54°10′N 56°26′E
- Country: Russia
- Region: Bashkortostan
- District: Gafuriysky District
- Time zone: UTC+5:00

Baimbetovo (Russian: Баимбетово, Кунакбай, Bashkir: Байымбәт, Ҡунаҡбай, Bayımbet, Qunaqbay) is a rural locality (a village) in Burlinsky Selsoviet, Gafuriysky District, Bashkortostan, Russia. The population was 175 in 2010.

== History ==
The village was founded in the 17th century by Baimbet Ichigulov (Bashkir: Байымбәт Илсеғолов).

It was known by two names: Baimbetovo and Kunakbai (Bashkir: Байымбәт һәм Ҡунаҡбай).

Earlier in 1896, the village was located near the Burlinka River.

At the end of the 19th century a water mill operated there.

== Geography ==
It is located 139 km from Ufa (the capital of Bashkortostan), 36 km north of Krasnousolsky (rural locality) and 6 km from Burly.
