= Berlei House =

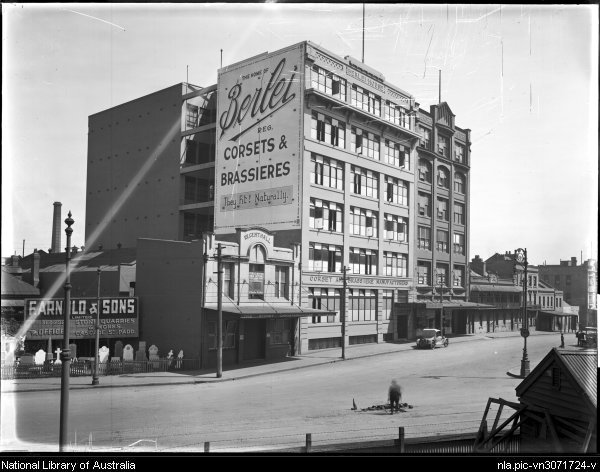
- Berlei House

- Location within inner Sydney
- Alternative names: Curtin House
- Etymology: Berlei

General information
- Status: Completed
- Architectural style: Inter-war Art Deco
- Location: 39–47 Regent Street, Chippendale, City of Sydney, New South Wales, Australia
- Coordinates: 33.88530°S 151.20267°E
- Current tenants: Curtin University
- Completed: c. 1920s
- Client: Berlei United Limited

Technical details
- Material: Concrete
- Floor count: Six (6)
- Floor area: 3,822 square metres (41,140 sq ft)
- Grounds: 673 square metres (7,240 sq ft)

Berlei House, now known as Curtin House, is an Inter-war Art Deco-style building located at 39-47 Regent Street, Chippendale, in the City of Sydney local government area of New South Wales, Australia. The concrete building with six floors was built for Berlei United Limited in the early 1920s and occupied by Berlei in 1922.

It was converted into an office building and, for some years, was the Sydney office of the engineering consultancy, Gutteridge Haskins & Davey.

It is considered an architecturally significant building, and is a key part of a proposed heritage area in and around South Regent Street.

The building has been renovated and is now being used by Curtin University.

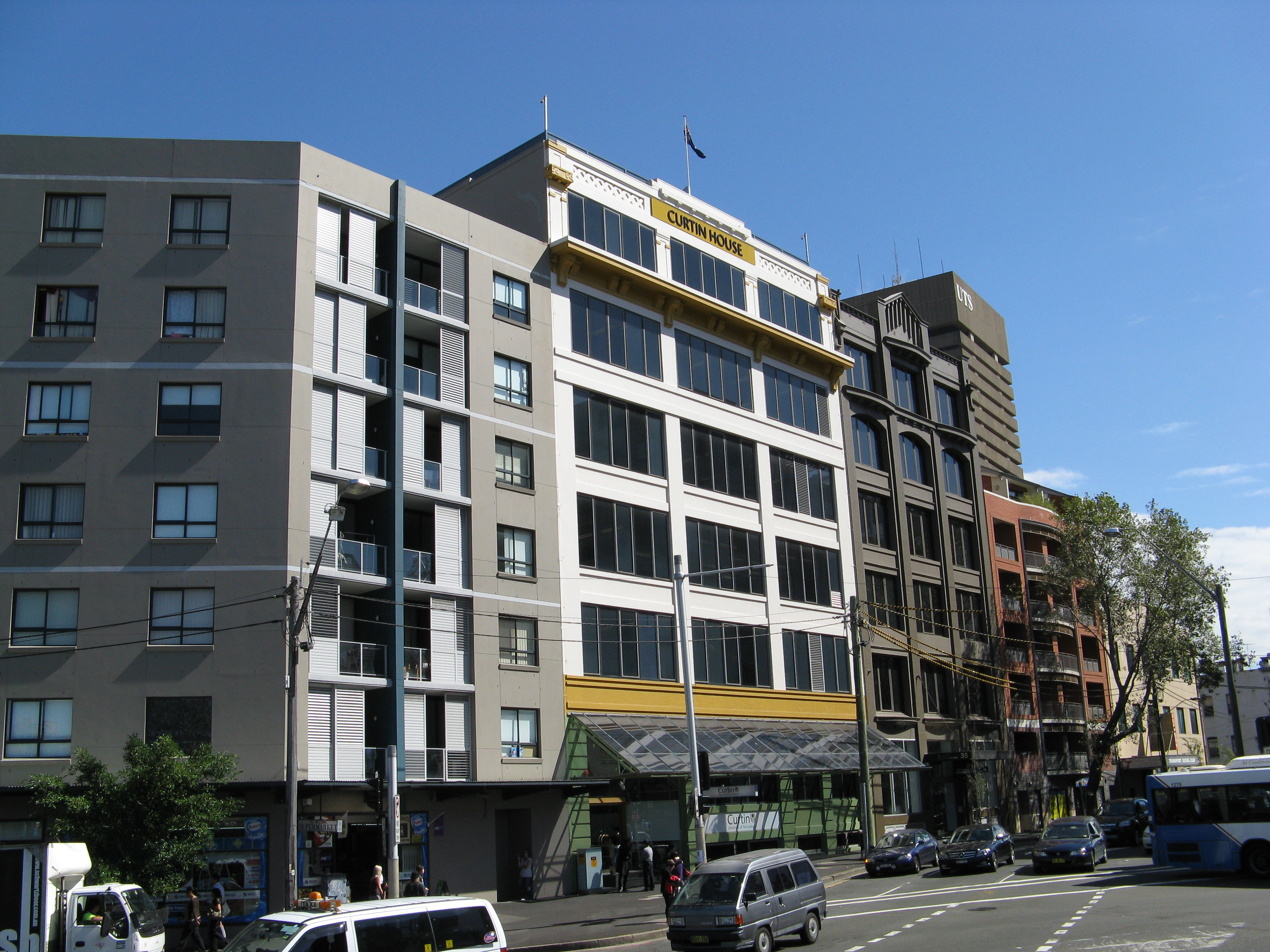
Curtin House in 2008
