= Football (ball) =

Ball used in the sport of football

A football is a ball inflated with air that is used to play one of the various sports known as football. In these games, with some exceptions, goals or points are scored only when the ball enters one of two designated goal-scoring areas; football games involve the two teams each trying to move the ball in opposite directions along the field of play.

The first balls were made of natural materials, such as an inflated pig bladder, later put inside a leather cover, which has given rise to the American slang-term "pigskin". Modern balls are designed by teams of engineers to exacting specifications, with rubber or plastic bladders, and often with plastic covers. Various leagues and games use different balls, though they all have one of the following basic shapes:

1. A sphere, used in association football and Gaelic football
2. A prolate spheroid (elongated sphere), used in the rugby codes and Australian football
3. A lemon, used in gridiron football

The precise shape and construction of footballs is typically specified as part of the rules and regulations.

The oldest football still in existence, which is thought to have been made circa 1550, was discovered in the roof of Stirling Castle, Scotland, in 1981. The ball is made of leather (possibly from a deer) and a pig's bladder. It is roughly spherical with a diameter of between 14–16 cm (5.5–6.3 in), weighs 410–450 g (14–16 oz) and is currently on display at the Smith Art Gallery and Museum in Stirling.

== Association football ==
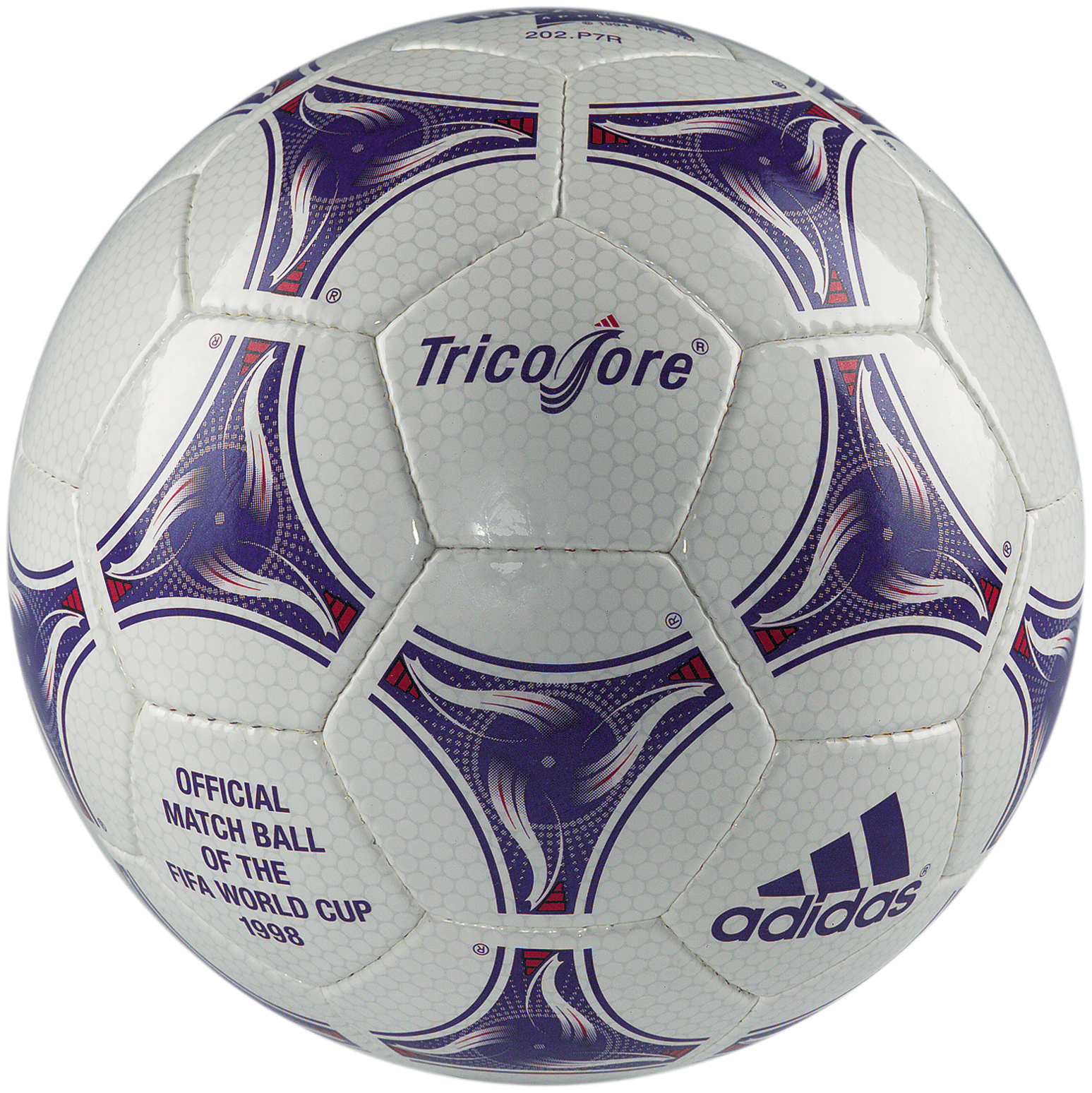
Adidas Tricolore, the official ball for the 1998 World Cup

Law 2 of the game specifies that the ball is an air-filled sphere with a circumference of 68–70 cm (27–28 in), a weight of 410–450 g (14–16 oz), inflated to a pressure of 0.6 to 1.1 atmospheres (60–111 kPa or 8.7–16.1 psi) "at sea level", and covered in leather or "other suitable material". The weight specified for a ball is the dry weight, as older balls often became significantly heavier in the course of a match played in wet weather.

Most modern Association footballs are stitched from 32 panels of waterproofed leather or plastic: 12 regular pentagons and 20 regular hexagons are used because of their contrasting colors, which makes it easier for viewers to follow the movement. The 32-panel configuration is the spherical polyhedron corresponding to the truncated icosahedron; it is spherical because the faces bulge from the pressure of the air inside. The first 32-panel ball was marketed by Select in the 1950s in Denmark. This configuration became common throughout Continental Europe in the 1960s, and was publicised worldwide by the Adidas Telstar, the official ball of the 1970 World Cup. This design is often referenced when describing the truncated icosahedron Archimedean solid, carbon buckyballs, or the root structure of geodesic domes. Along with its shape the material that is used to make this ball is just as important. This material known as polyurethane is preferred when compared to the previous one (leather) especially for durability and performance.

== Australian rules football ==
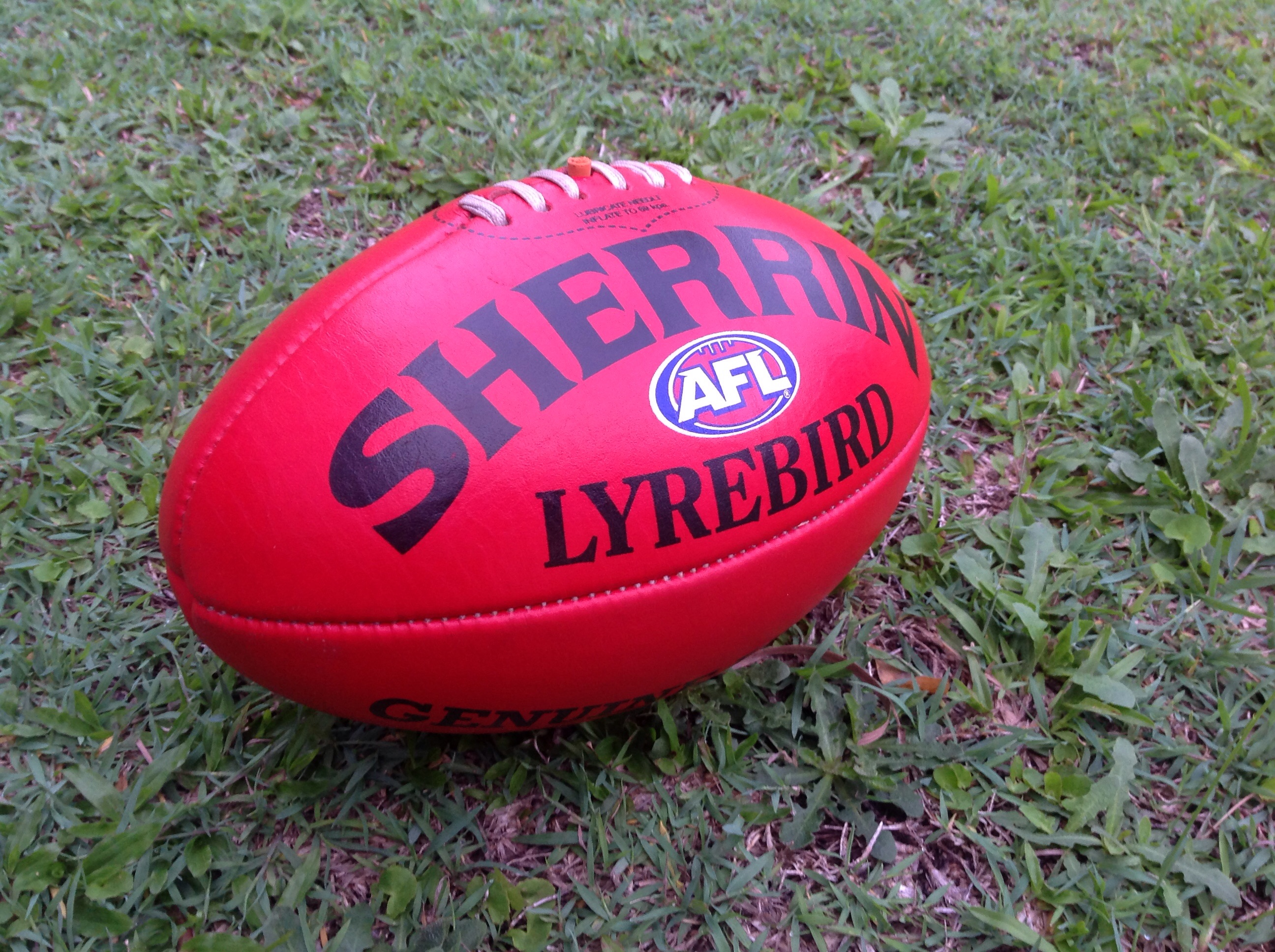
An Australian rules football by Sherrin

The football used in Australian football is similar to a rugby ball but generally slightly smaller and more rounded at the ends, but more elongated in overall appearance, being longer by comparison with its width than a rugby ball. A regulation football is 720–730 millimetres (28–29 in) in circumference, and 545–555 mm (21.5–21.9 in) transverse circumference, and inflated to a pressure of 62–76 kPa (9.0–11.0 psi). In the AFL, the balls are red for day matches and yellow for night matches.

The first games of Australian football were played with a round ball, because balls of that shape were more readily available. In 1860, Australian football pioneer Tom Wills argued that the oval rugby ball travelled further in the air and made for a more exciting game. It became customary in Australian football by the 1870s.

The Australian football ball was invented by T. W. Sherrin in 1880, after he was given a misshapen rugby ball to fix. Sherrin designed the ball with indented rather than pointy ends to give the ball a better bounce.

Australian football ball brands include Burley, Ross Faulkner, and Sherrin (the brand used by the Australian Football League).

== Gaelic football ==
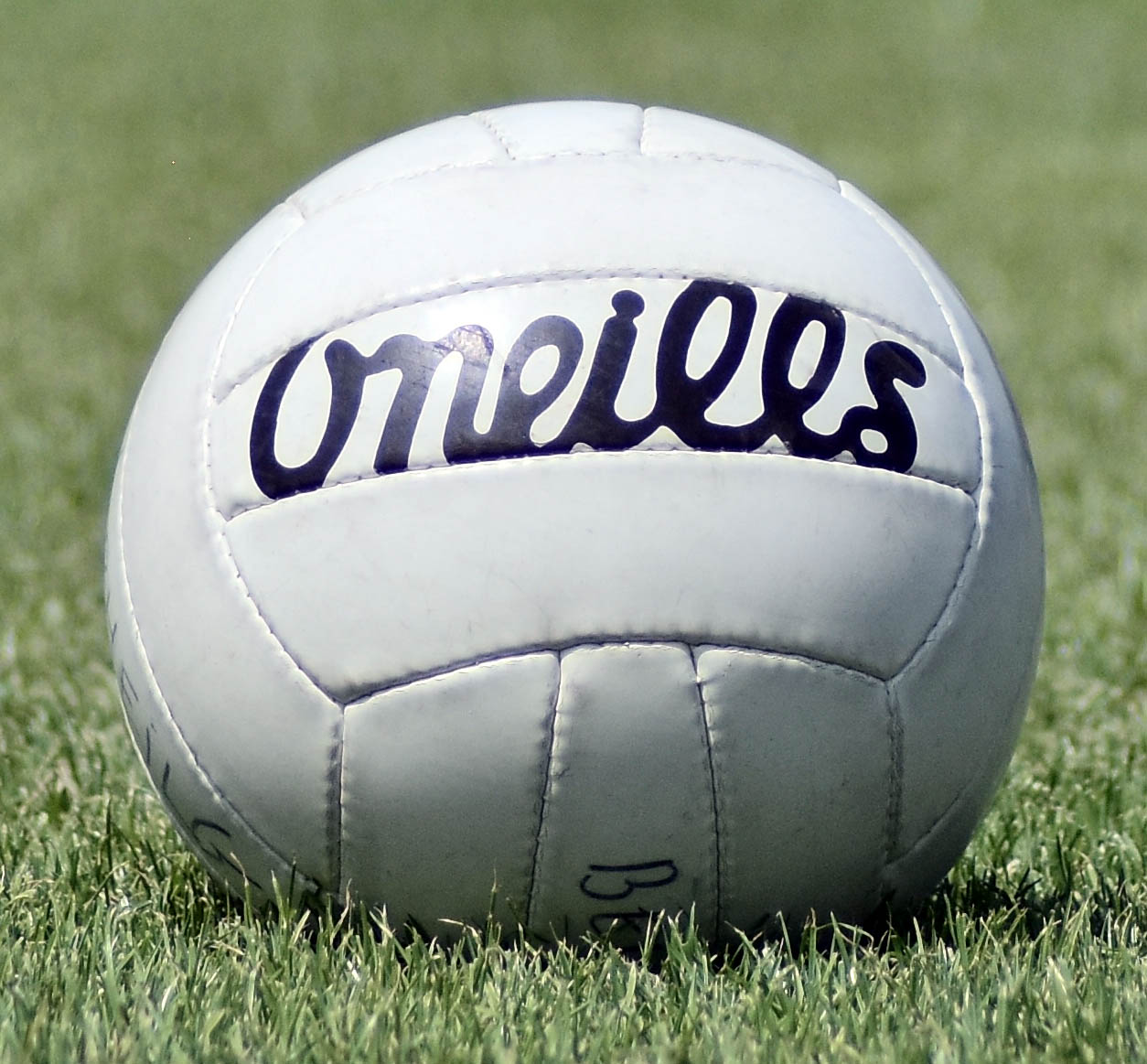
Gaelic football ball by O'Neills

The game is played with a round leather football made of 18 stitched leather panels, similar in appearance and size to a traditional association football, with a circumference of 68–70 cm (27–28 in), weighing between 480–500 g (17–18 oz) when dry. It may be kicked or hand passed. A hand pass is a strike of the ball with the side of the closed fist, using the knuckle of the thumb.

== Gridiron football ==
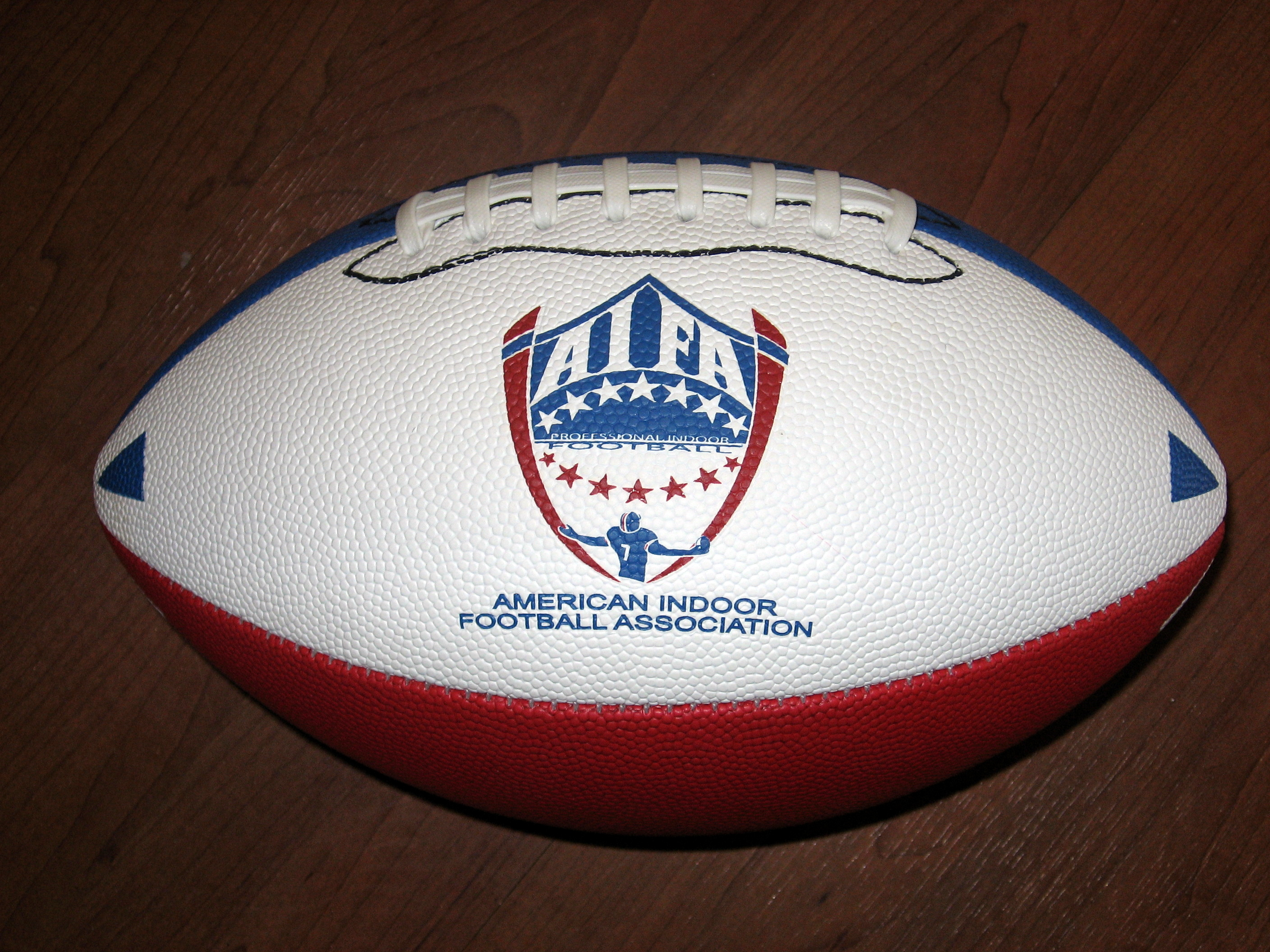
Arena football ball

Footballs used in gridiron-style games have prominent points on both ends. The shape is generally credited to official Hugh "Shorty" Ray, who introduced the new ball in 1934 as a way to make the forward pass more effective.

Gridiron footballs are made of cow hide leather, which is required in professional and collegiate football, or in organized youth leagues may be made of rubber or plastic materials (the high school football rulebooks still allow the inexpensive all-rubber footballs, though they are less common than leather). Since 1941, Horween Leather Company has been the exclusive supplier of leather for National Football League footballs. The arrangement was established by Arnold Horween, who played and coached in the NFL. Horween Leather Company also supplies leather to Spalding, supplier of balls to the Arena Football League. The NFL once explored the usage of white-striped footballs – in Super Bowl VIII.

== Rugby football ==
Until 1870, rugby union and later rugby league was played with a near spherical ball with an inner-tube made of a pig's bladder. In 1870 Richard Lindon and Bernardo Solano started making balls for Rugby school out of hand stitched, four-panel, leather casings and pigs' bladders. The rugby ball's distinctive shape is supposedly due to the pig's bladder, although early balls were more plum-shape than oval. The balls varied in size in the beginning depending upon how large the pig's bladder was. Because of the pliability of rubber the shape gradually changed from a sphere to an egg. In 1892 the RFU endorsed ovalness as the compulsory shape. The gradual flattening of the ball continued over the years.

=== Rugby league ===
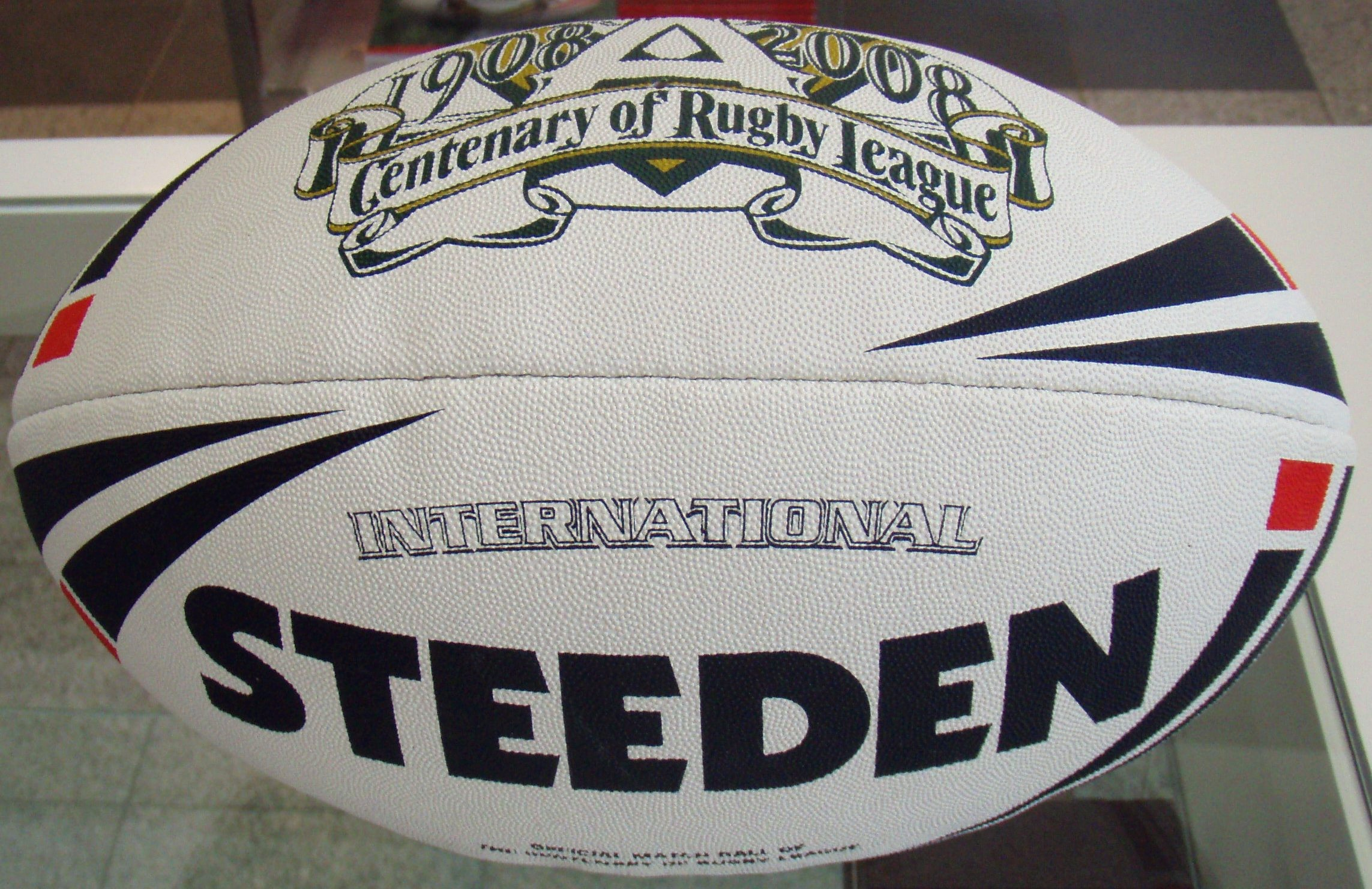
Steeden football as used in rugby league

Rugby league is played with a prolate spheroid shaped football which is inflated with air. A referee will stop play immediately if the ball does not meet the requirements of size and shape. Traditionally made of brown leather, modern footballs are synthetic and manufactured in a variety of colours and patterns. Senior competitions should use light-coloured balls to allow spectators to see the ball more easily.

=== Rugby union ===
A rugby union ball is a prolate spheroid. A regulation ball is 28–30 cm (11–12 in) long and 58–62 cm (23–24 in) in circumference at its widest point. It weighs 410–460 g (14–16 oz) and is inflated to 65.7–68.8 kPa (9.5–10.0 psi).

In 1980, leather-encased balls, which were prone to water-logging, were replaced with balls encased in synthetic waterproof materials.

== See also ==
- List of inflatable manufactured goods

== Bibliography ==
- Angela Royston, 2005. How Is a Soccer Ball Made? Heinemann. ISBN 1-4034-6642-4.
