= Sherrin =

Australian football manufacturer

- Type: Private
- Industry: Sports equipment
- Founded: 1880; 146 years ago in Collingwood, Australia (as "T.W. Sherrin Pty Ltd")
- Founder: Thomas W. Sherrin
- Headquarters: Scoresby, Victoria, Australia
- Products: Australian rules footballs
- Website: sherrin.com.au

Sherrin is a brand of football used in Australian rules football and is the official ball of the Australian Football League, designed to its official specifications. It was the first ball designed specifically for the sport.

Sherrin footballs are manufactured in Melbourne, Australia, from cowhide-lined, machine-stitched material, but other-sized models are often made in India or China using synthetic rubber.

"The Sherrin" has become a commentators' synonym for the ball while describing play.

== History ==
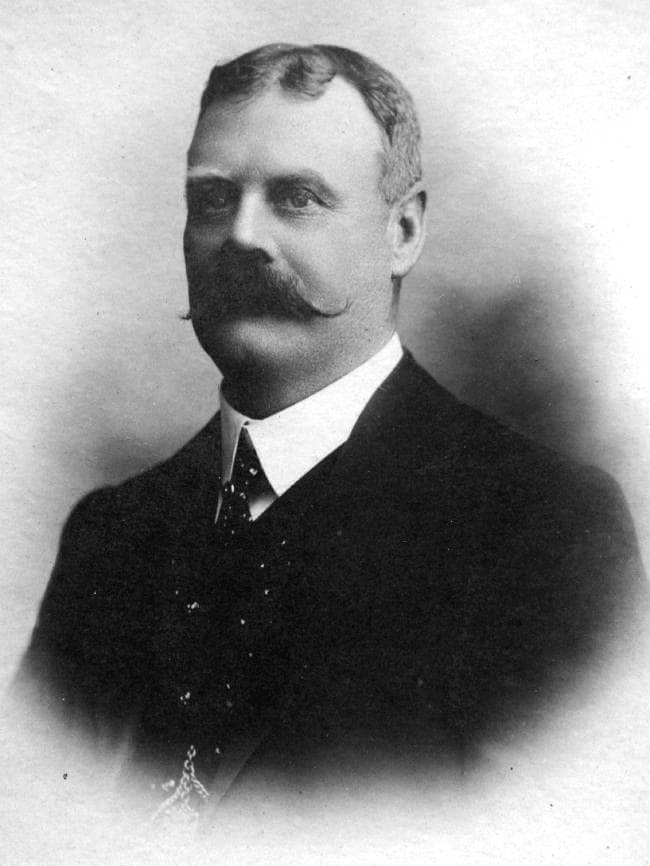
Thomas W. Sherrin, founder

In 1879, Thomas W. Sherrin opened a factory at 32 Wellington Street in Collingwood. The first Australian rules football was invented by Sherrin himself in 1880, when he was given a misshapen football to fix.

The inaugural rules of the Victorian Football Association (VFA) in 1877 explicitly mandated the use of a "No. 2 size Rugby ball" (a rugby union ball) measuring 26 inches in circumference. In 1897 this was still the current VFA rule and was carried over verbatim to the newly founded Victorian Football League (VFL/AFL).

Sherrin began production in 1897 in a workshop in Collingwood, which had produced a variety of leather sporting goods since 1880, including footballs, cricket balls, boxing gloves and punching balls. The quality of Sherrin's goods was widely regarded.

The sport known as football, or "footy", was rapidly increasing in popularity, and Sherrin footballs soon became the icon for being the first ball made for Australian rules football.

In the 1930s Syd Sherrin, nephew of Thomas Sherrin, designed the Sherrin with indented rather than pointy ends to give the ball a better bounce. The new-shaped ball was so quickly accepted that the National Football League of Australia eventually used the size and shape as standard.

The company was sold in 1972 to the Australian subsidiary of Spalding. In 2003, Spalding was acquired by the Russell Corporation, which would become part of Fruit of the Loom three years later.

== Products ==
=== Specifications ===
Full-Size Ball (n° 5)

- 720mm circumference (Parallel to stitched seam).
- 540mm circumference (perpendicular to the stitched seam).

=== Sizes, models and colours ===
Models of the Sherrin football include:

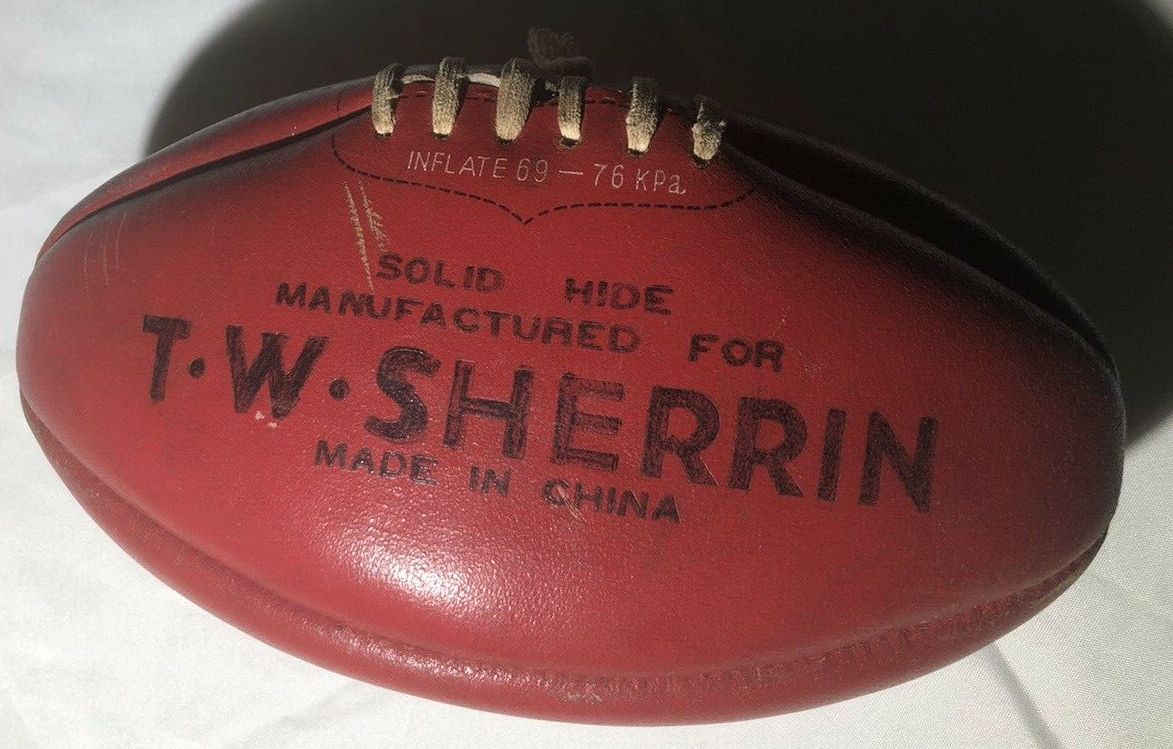
Sherrin made in China

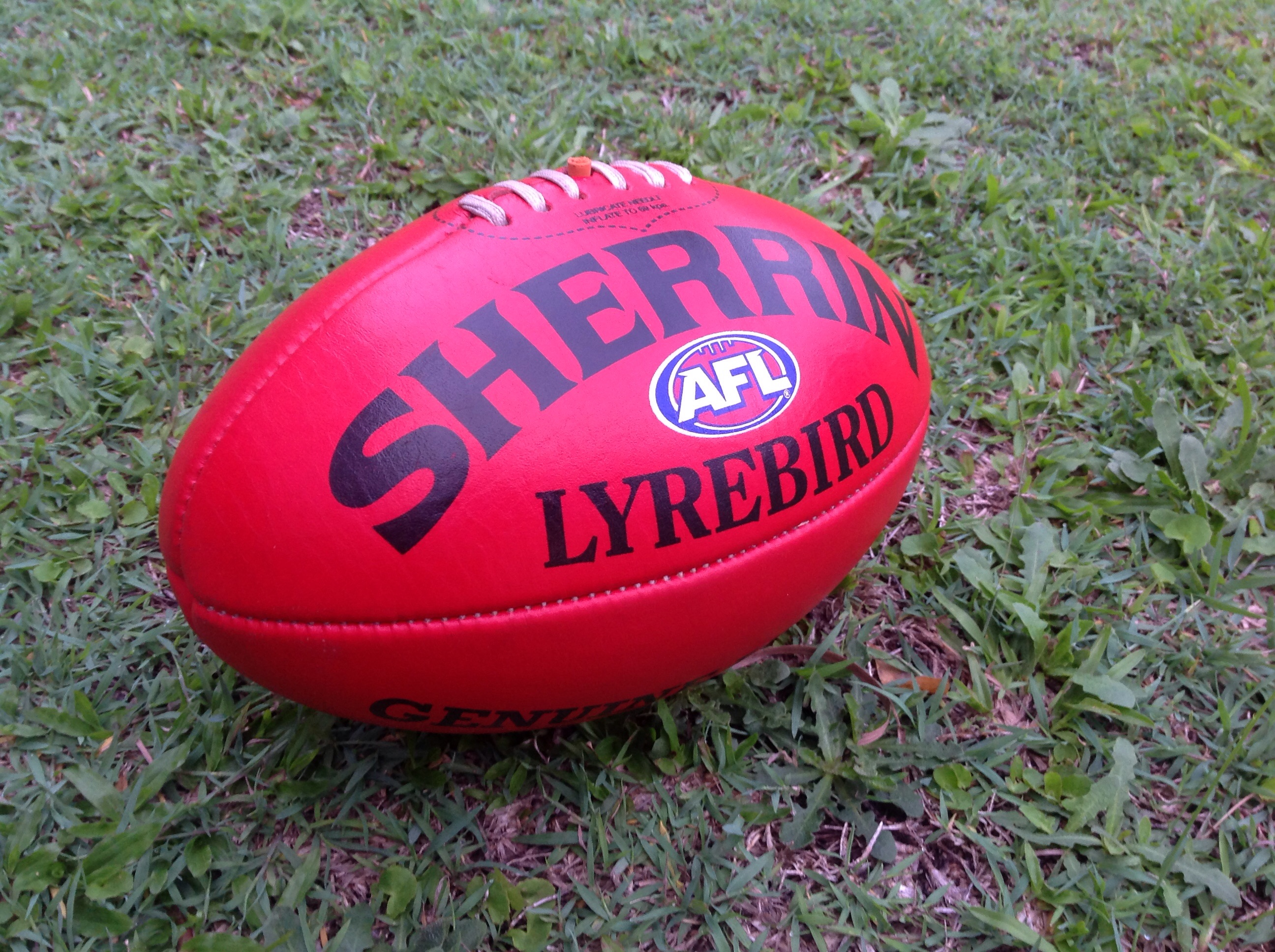
A full-size Sherrin Lyrebird ball

- Size 5: The full and official playing size for adult men's competition, made to AFL and most other league specifications.
- Size 4 (women's): Smaller than the men's official size football, the official size for adult women's competition, made to AFLW and other women's league specifications.
- Size 3: Smaller again, and popular among players aged 6–10. Usually made from rubber synthetic
- Lyrebird: Made by Sherrin but slightly different in comparison with other Sherrin models and sizes, with a slightly pointier angle for easier kicking and marking. The Lyrebird model is around $40 cheaper than the KB Sherrin, because of the lower quality and durability. Made from Indian imported leather
- "Soft-Touch": These are made in all sizes, but are made with a soft-dense rubber rather than leather or rubber synthetic, to give the ball a "soft-touch" (also making the ball easier to kick and mark)
- Colours, rubber or leather, different sizes: These are factors for the player/consumer to decide. Sizes 3 and 4 are popular among children aged 6–13, while genuine leather, full-sized KB models (the red coloured KB used for day AFL matches, and the yellow coloured KB used for day matches beginning after 3:00pm, twilight, night or indoor AFL matches) are popular among players aged 14+, beginners, intermediate, or advanced players. AFL club colours, mascots and logos printed on various sizes of the Sherrin are also popular with fans of the club and players.

== The meaning of "Kangaroo Brand" ==
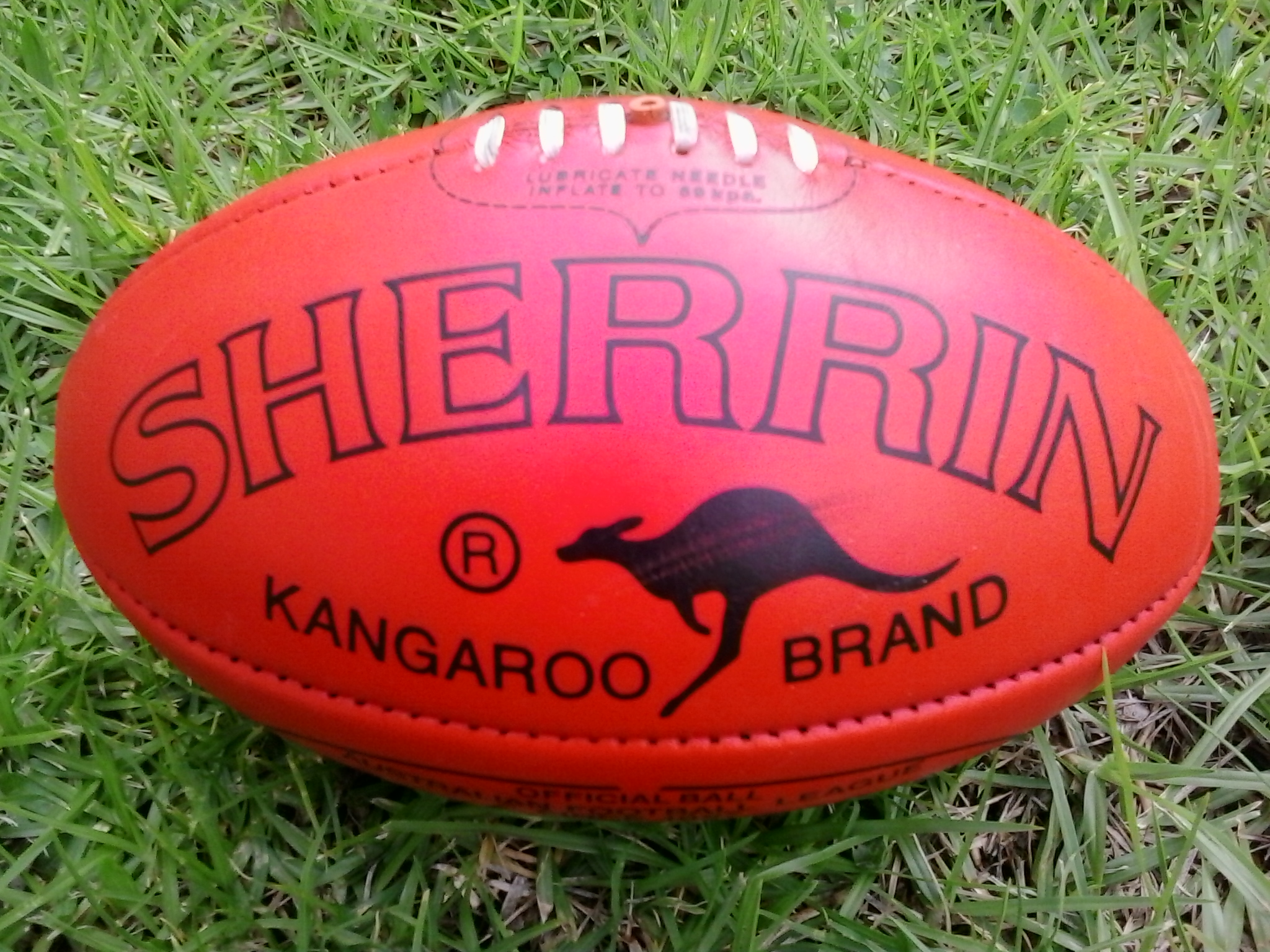
Kangaroo model, used in the AFL

The term "Kangaroo Brand" ("KB") refers to a type of Sherrin football. When T.W. Sherrin started manufacturing footballs, several models were produced (such as the "MATCH III" Sherrin), but the "Kangaroo Brand" was Sherrin's best-selling, highest-quality, and most favoured and traditional football.

== Endorsements ==
Sherrin is the official brand of football used by the Australian Football League, which has been the case since the 1880s.

At the state level, Sherrin is used in the Victorian Football League and many local competitions. The other major brand of football is Burley-Sekem, which is used at state level in the West Australian Football League.

== Illegal child labour stitching footballs ==
After a 12-month-long investigation, The Saturday Age, a Melbourne newspaper, claimed that "two of Australia's best-known football brands, Sherrin and Canterbury, have operations in India that use banned child labour." The children took an hour to make one AFL ball and were paid 7 rupees (A$0.12) per ball, amounting to $1 a day. That claim was in direct contradiction to the company website that claimed the balls were made in Scoresby, Victoria.

A follow-up investigation by Fairfax Media in September 2013 revealed that another brand of rugby ball was being stitched using illegal child labour in Jalandhar, Punjab, for sale in Australia.

== See also ==
- List of oldest companies in Australia
- List of companies named after people
