= Esther Bubley =

American photographer

- Esther Bubley, self-portrait c. 1950
- Born: February 16, 1921; Phillips, Wisconsin
- Died: March 16, 1998 (aged 77); New York City, New York
- Occupation: American photographer
- Spouse: Edwin Locke (Divorced)
- Parent(s): Louis and Ida Bubley
- Website: Esther Bubley Photography Archive

Esther Bubley (February 16, 1921 – March 16, 1998) was an American photographer who specialized in expressive photos of ordinary people in everyday lives. She worked for several agencies of the American government and her work also featured in several news and photographic magazines.

== Life and career ==
Esther Bubley was born in Phillips, Wisconsin, the fourth of five children of Russian Jewish immigrants Louis and Ida Bubley. In 1936, while Esther was a senior at Central High School in Superior, Wisconsin, the photo magazine Life first hit the newsstands. Inspired by the magazine, and particularly by the pictures of the Great Depression produced by the Farm Security Administration, she developed a passion for photojournalism and documentary photography. As editor-in-chief of the yearbook, she sought to emulate the style of Life. After high school, Bubley spent two years at Superior State Teachers College (now the University of Wisconsin–Superior) before enrolling in the one-year photography program at the Minneapolis School of Art (now the Minneapolis College of Art and Design).

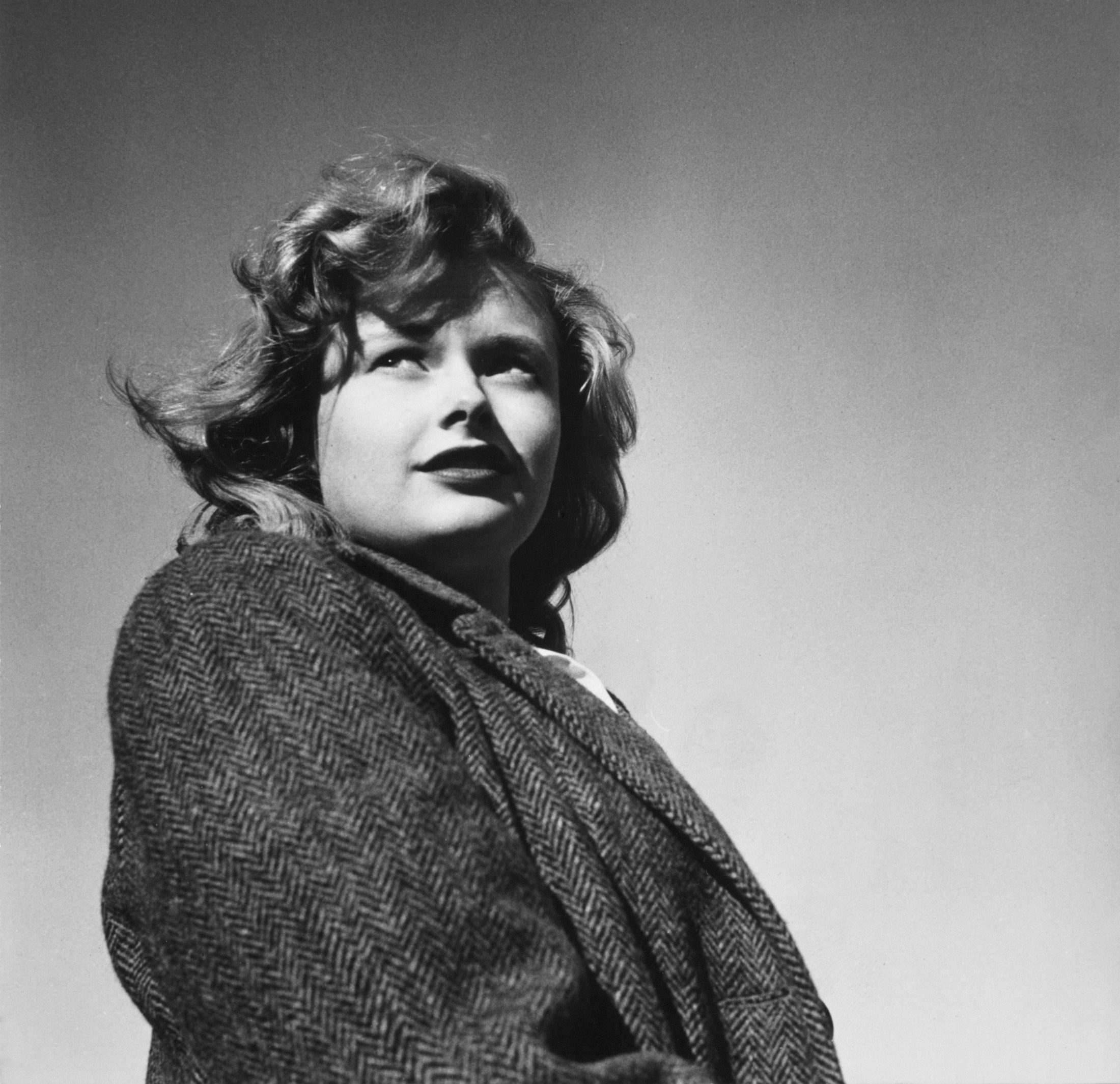
A student at Woodrow Wilson High School, Washington DC, 1943

After college in 1941, Bubley moved to Washington, D.C. seeking work as a photographer. Failing to find a job in Washington, Bubley moved to New York City. During the 1941 Christmas season, she landed a position at Vogue in New York, but she did not like the work. Early in 1942, she returned to Washington when she was offered a job as a microfilmer for the National Archives and Records Administration.

In the fall of 1942, Roy Stryker hired her as a darkroom assistant at the Office of War Information (OWI), where his photographic unit had recently been transferred from the Farm Security Administration. With the encouragement of Stryker, and some of the more senior photographers, she moved to taking pictures for the OWI historical section, documenting life on the home front during the war. Her most challenging assignment was a noted series on the bus system in the Midwest and South.

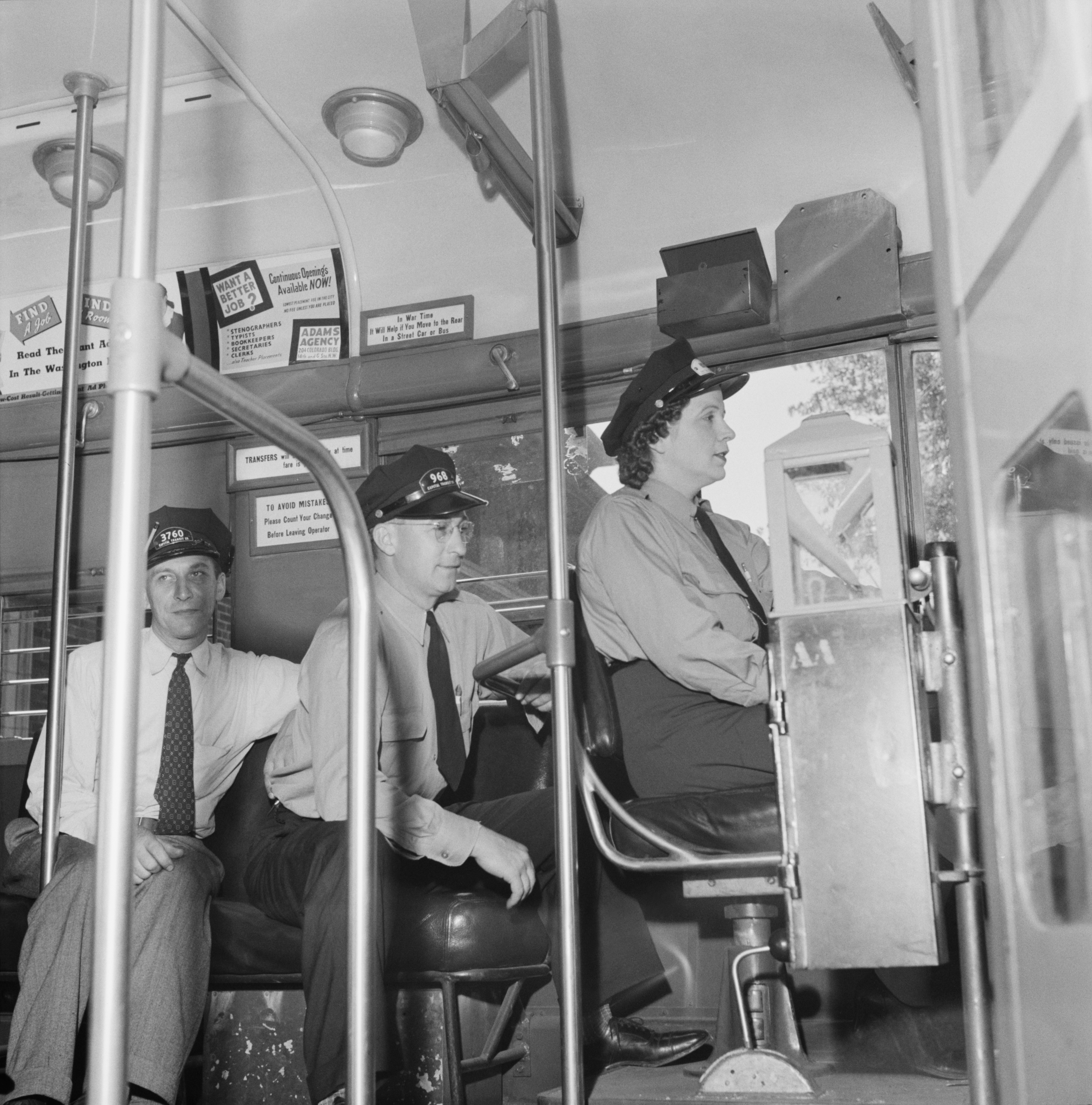
"An instructor of the Capitol Transit Company teaching a woman to operate a one-man streetcar", photograph of a traditionally male job being done by a woman during World War II, by Esther Bubley, June 1943

In late 1943, when Stryker left the OWI to work on a public relations project for the Standard Oil Company (New Jersey), she accompanied him, producing a profile of Tomball, Texas, an oil boom town. The Bus Story series she produced for Standard Oil, a reprise of her earlier Bus Story for the OWI, earned the award for Best Picture Sequence in the Encyclopædia Britannica/University of Missouri School of Journalism "News Pictures of the Year" in 1948. During this period, she was briefly married to Edwin Locke, Stryker's administrative chief, but they soon divorced.

By 1947, Bubley was expanding her horizons beyond Stryker and Standard Oil. She began working for the Children's Bureau, a federal child welfare agency. Over the next several years, she contributed thousands of images to their files, and her work appeared on more than thirty covers of their journal The Child.

In 1948, Bubley was hired by the Chicago, Burlington and Quincy Railroad, along with Russell Lee, to document the social and economic impact of the railroad. Together they producing over 3000 negatives of daily life along the railroad.

In 1949, Bubley's photo essay on mental illness for the Ladies' Home Journal was given the first place award for a feature in the Encyclopædia Britannica/University of Missouri School of Journalism contest, winning Bubley a second set of the Encyclopedia. She continued working for the Ladies' Home Journal, producing a dozen photo stories for their celebrated series "How America Lives," which ran intermittently between 1948 and 1960.

In 1951, Bubley began to freelance for Life, eventually contributing 40 photo stories, including two cover stories. Bubley was one of the first women to successfully support herself working as a freelance photographer for the major magazines. That same year, she produced a series on the Pittsburgh Children's Hospital for Stryker, who was then establishing the Pittsburgh Photographic Library. Edward Steichen, Directory of Photography at the Museum of Modern Art (MoMA), used 13 prints from this series in the 1952 exhibition Diogenese with a Camera. He also mounted and displayed her contact sheets to show how she used every frame. This series led to medical themes becoming a major part of her portfolio. In 1953, she was hired by UNICEF and the French government to travel to Morocco to photograph a program to treat trachoma, an infectious disease that causes blindness. Bubley entered a photo from this assignment in the international division of a contest sponsored by Photography magazine in 1954. She became the first woman to win first place, and she received a trophy depicting a male photographer.

In 1955, Steichen included her work in his monumental The Family of Man exhibition.

In 1956, Pepsi-Cola International hired Bubley to cover Latin America for their company magazine Panorama. In the mid-1960s, Pan American World Airways sent her around the world twice to make images for their corporate photographic library.

In the late 1960s, Bubley reduced her workload as sales of photographic magazines declined, and she wearied of the grueling travel schedule. She spent more time at home in New York City where she pursued projects of personal interest, producing two children's books about animals and a book featuring macro photography of plants.

Bubley worked freelance for magazines such as Ladies' Home Journal and Life.

A devoted animal lover, she spent her mornings in Central Park walking her dog, taking photographs, and making notes that she hoped to turn into a book about the park. In 1991 the Minneapolis College of Art and Design awarded Bubley an honorary doctorate. She died in New York City, of cancer, on March 16, 1998.

In 2001 a retrospective exhibition of Bubley's work appeared at the UBS Art Gallery in New York City. In 2005 Aperture Foundation published a monograph about Bubley, Esther Bubley: On Assignment by photographic historian Bonnie Yochelson with Tracy A. Schmid, archivist for the Bubley Estate. In 2010, the Library of Congress published the monograph Fields of Vision: The Photographs of Esther Bubley.

== Selected exhibitions ==
- In and Out of Focus, Museum of Modern Art, New York, NY, 1948.
- Six Women Photographers, Museum of Modern Art, New York, NY, 1950.
- Diogenes with a Camera, Museum of Modern Art, New York, NY, 1952.
- Family of Man, Museum of Modern Art, New York, NY, 1955.
- Esther Bubley, Limelight Gallery, New York, NY, 1956.
- Out of the Forties, Amon Carter Museum, Fort Worth, TX, 1983.
- Documenting America, 1935–1943, Library of Congress, Washington, DC, 1988.
- On Assignment: Documentary Photographs from the 1930s and 1940s by Marion Post Wolcott and Esther Bubley, Art Institute of Chicago, Chicago, IL, 1989.
- Esther Bubley: On Assignment, Photographs Since 1939, University at Buffalo, Buffalo, NY, 1990.
- Photographs by Esther Bubley, Phillips Collection, Washington, DC, 1995.
- The American Century: Art & Culture 1900–1950, Whitney Museum of American Art, New York, NY, 1999.
- Esther Bubley: American Photojournalist, UBS Art Gallery, New York, NY, 2001.
- Breaking the Frame: Pioneering Women in Photojournalism, Museum of Photographic Arts, San Diego, CA, 2006.
- Children's Hospital 1951: Photographs by Esther Bubley, Frick Art & Historical Center, Pittsburgh, PA, 2009.
- Esther Bubley Up Front, National Museum of Women in the Arts, Washington, D.C. 2015-2016.
- Esther Bubley: Photographing the Homefront, Lillian and Albert Small Capital Jewish Museum, Washington, D.C. 2026-2027.

== Awards ==
- Distinctive Merit, Art Directors Club, 1943.
- First awards from the University of Missouri School of Journalism and the Encyclopædia Britannica, 1948 and 1949.
- Third Prize, Life magazine contest for young photographers, 1951.
- First Prize, Photography Magazine, International Contest, 1954.
- First Award, Art Directors Club, 1958.
- Honorary doctorate, Minneapolis College of Art and Design, 1991.

== Monographs ==
- Zoo pals: Big cats, great apes—a look at zoo life, January 1, 1960
- How Puppies Grow, 1971, Millicent E. Selsam (Author), Esther Bubley (Illustrator), ISBN 978-0-590-40974-2
- How Kittens Grow, 1973, Millicent E. Selsam, ISBN 978-0-590-07409-4
- A Mysterious Presence: Macrophotography of Plants, text by Percy Knauth, July 1979, ISBN 978-0-911104-99-8
- Esther Bubley's World of Children in Photographs, June 1982, ISBN 978-0-8446-5880-3
- Charlie Parker, November 1995, Hank O'Neal (Text), Esther Bubley (Photographer), ISBN 978-2-85018-223-5
- Esther Bubley: On Assignment, April 2005, Bonnie Yochelson, ISBN 978-1-931788-57-1
- Fields of Vision: The Photographs of Esther Bubley, March 2010, Amy Pastan (series editor), ISBN 978-1-904832-48-5
