= Jim Burleigh =

English footballer

Personal information
- Full name: James Burleigh
- Date of birth: 24 February 1869
- Place of birth: Wolverhampton, England
- Date of death: 1917
- Position: Outside left

Senior career*
Years	Team	Apps	(Gls)
- Stafford Royal
1890–1892	Wolverhampton Wanderers	2	(0)
- Willenhall
- * Club domestic league appearances and goals

James Burleigh (24 February 1869 – 1917) was an English footballer who played as an outside left for Wolverhampton Wanderers in the Football League.

Although mostly only employed as a reserve, Burleigh made two appearances for Wolves' first team during September 1891.
