= Burleigh Fields =

Coordinates: 52.7715°N 1.2174°W

Burleigh Fields in Loughborough, England was the home of the Johnson family from the 18th century until 1867. There are differing views as to exactly when the house was built, with some saying 1718 and others 1768.

== The Johnson family ==
In 1718, Thomas Johnson (1660–1720), the elder son of John Johnson (1634–1709) of The Manor House, Barkby, moved to Loughborough. His eldest son, John Johnson (1687–1753), married Elizabeth Palmer of Hathern in 1716 at Loughborough. Their son Nathaniel Palmer Johnson (1727–1800) married Sarah Gold of Birmingham and had eight children of whom six were daughters. The youngest son, John, born in 1774 died at the age of 21 and the second son, Nathaniel Palmer Johnson (1765–1850), became the Rector of Aston in Derbyshire and never married. After Nathaniel Palmer Johnson's death in 1800, his wife and six daughters, three of whom never married, continued to live in the house until they moved to Bath.

== Extensions ==
One of the daughters Elizabeth Johnson (1768–1832) built various extensions including the music room, the dining room and the enlargement of the drawing room. The family was very musical and both Nathaniel Plamer Johnson father and son are mentioned by William Gardiner in his "Music and Friends". The description of the younger saying "I speak of his elegant and amiable sisters in the first volume of this work, as the most accomplished ladies in Leicestershire." When the family moved to Bath, the house was let for a while to a Mr Gisborne.

== The Clanchy family ==
The house eventually passed to the youngest daughter Rebecca (1785–1857) who had married Major General Cassius Matthew Clanchy. He was living there from as early as 1832 until his death in 1857. In order to inherit the family wealth, Colonel Clanchy changed his name to Johnson on 26 March 1851.

== Other residents ==
After the death of Cassius Clanchy, the house was lived in by various families, the Harrolds in 1861, the Musters in 1871 and from about 1876 by Dr John Henry Eddowes who lived there with his two sisters Helen and Frances until sometime after 1891.

== Demolition ==
The house was demolished in about 1980.

== Sources ==
- A letter from Thomas Fielding Johnson (1828–1921)
- The genealogy of the Family of Johnson of Barkby published in 1898
- A note written by one of the sisters of John Henry Eddowes written in 1876
- Information from the national censuses of 1861, 1871, 1881 and 1891
