= Averil Burleigh =

British artist and painter

- portrait of Averil Burleigh by Charles Burleigh
- Born: 1883; Hassocks
- Died: 1949 (aged 65–66)
- Education: Brighton School of Art
- Known for: tempera painting
- Spouse: Charles H. H. Burleigh

Averil Mary Burleigh born Averil Mary Dell (1883–1949) was a British artist and painter. Based in Sussex, Burleigh was known for painting in egg tempera with the subject usually involving a central figure. Her husband and daughter also painted but she is the best regarded of the three.

== Biography ==
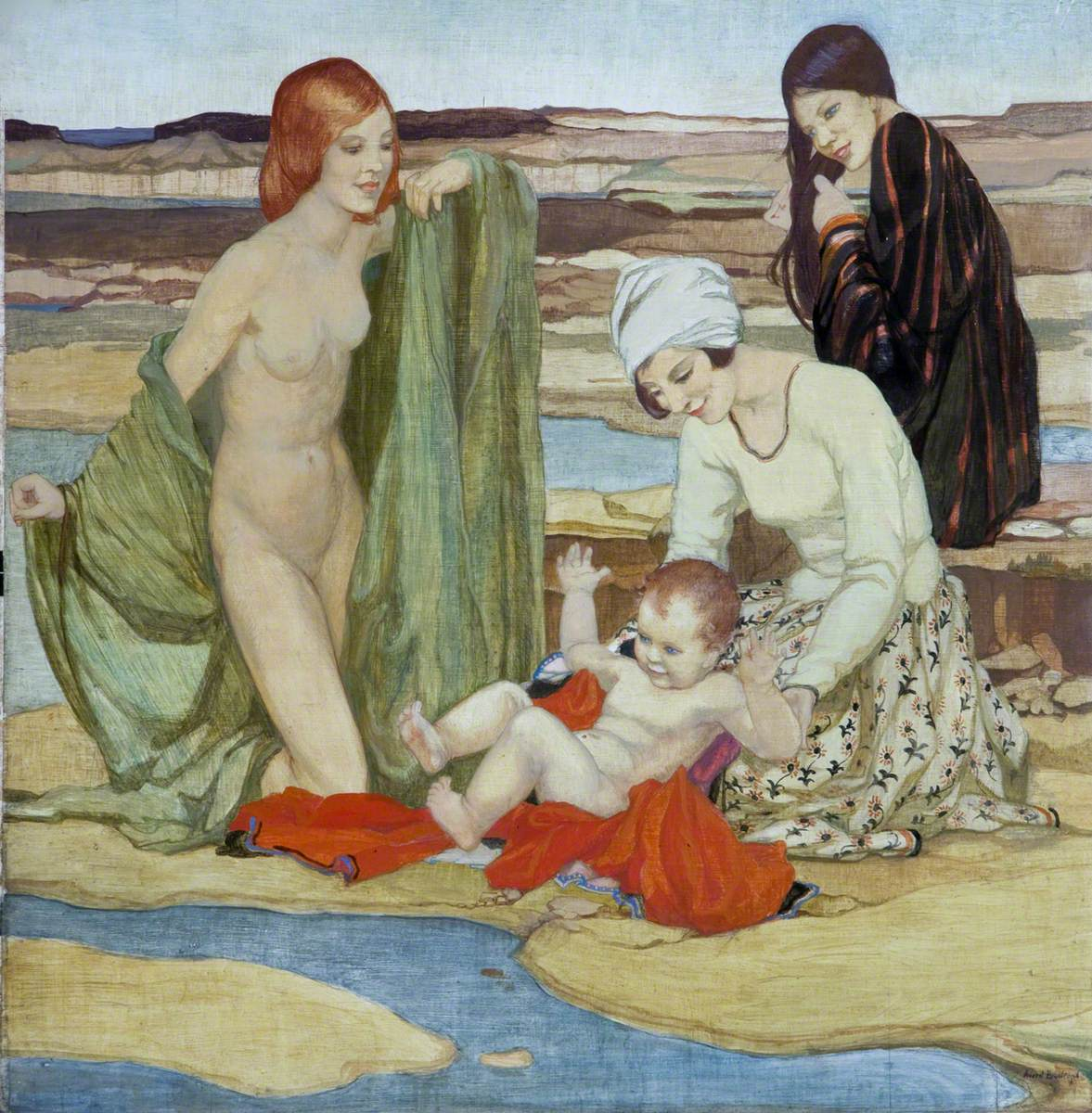
Sand Dunes

Burleigh was born in 1883 in Hassocks in West Sussex and went on to study at the Brighton School of Art. She married the painter Charles Burleigh and they lived and worked together as artists in Hove and Sussex. They designed a house with a large sun-lit top floor studio. Their daughter Veronica, who would also become a notable artist, was born there in 1909. The family never became rich from their works, and often relied on Burleigh's flair for buying and selling shares.

In 1911 Burleigh illustrated a book of John Keats' poetry and went on to illustrate plays by Shakespeare. In 1913 she was featured in Studio magazine. In 1927 Burleigh illustrated Thistledown by Leolyn Louise Everett. From 1939 she was a member of the Royal Society of Painters in Watercolours.

Burleigh became very ill in the 1940s, dying in 1949. Shortly before she died, Burleigh was elected an associate of the Royal Watercolour Society.

== Style and technique ==
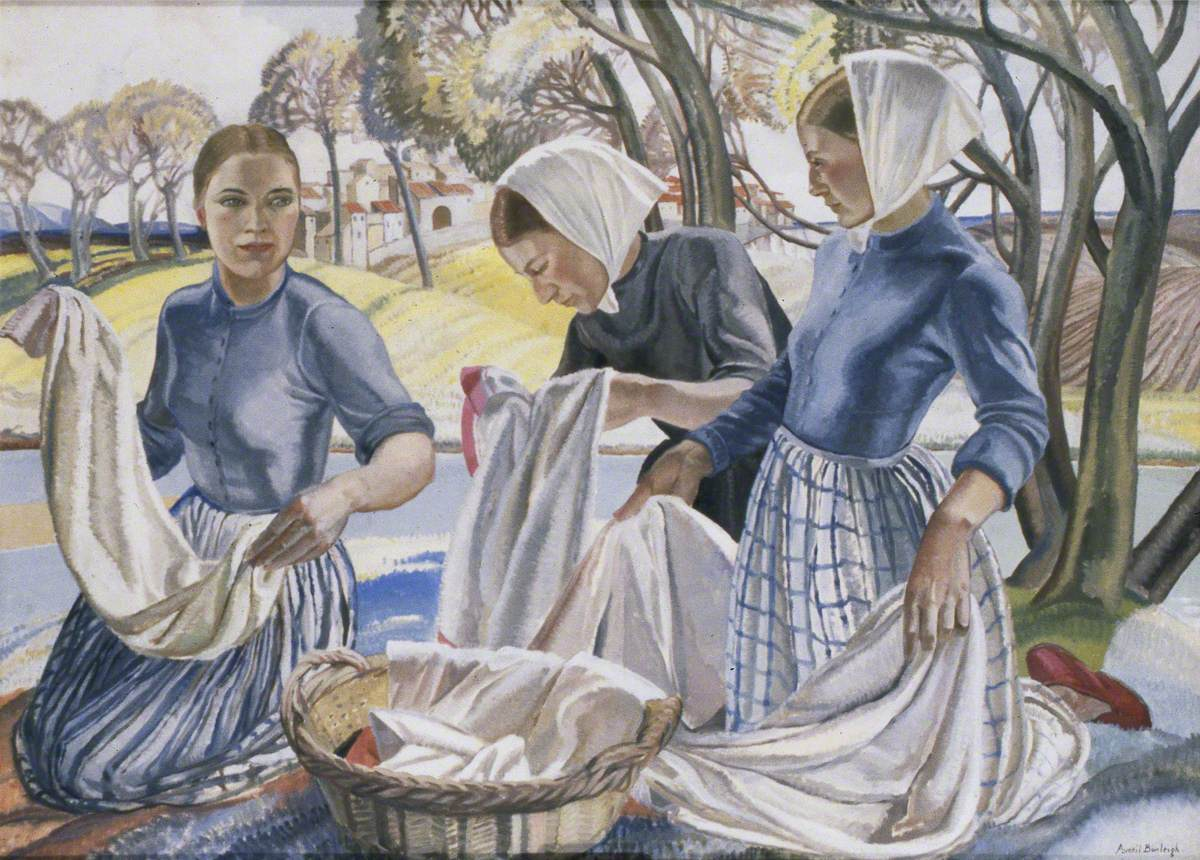
Washerwomen

Burleigh specialised in tempera painting, although she also worked in chalk and watercolour. Her works tend to have a bright colour palette with contrasting colours to lead the eye around the picture. A sharp luminosity and strong sense of design govern Burleigh's tempera and watercolour paintings. Frequently, her works portray decorative renaissance subjects, usually dominated by a female figure who is regularly modelled on her daughter, Veronica Burleigh. Burleigh however is also known to have completed images of still life and flowers. Over her career Burleigh's Pre-Raphaelite manner developed in to a freer style.

== Works ==
At the start of Burleigh's career she produced 24 colour illustrations for The Poems of John Keats in 1911. Her illustrations are Pre-Raphaelite in style and are dominated by a female figure. This is seen in 'Isabella; or, The Pot of Basil' which portrays a prominent female figure in decorative fabrics leaning upon a flourishing pot of basil. Bright pastel colours adorn the page, as they do with the other illustrations. This colour palette, along with Burleigh's use of flowing lines and bird, butterfly, and flower motifs, have led Helen Haworth to consider her "delicate watercolours more appropriate to a fairy-tale than Keats".

Kostas Boyiopoulus however, proposes that this statement does not take into account Burleigh's illustrations to Keats' ballad, "La Belle Dame sans Merci" which Boyiopoulus has described as a "nightmare" due to Burleigh's "faery's child" metamorphosing into a femme fatale. The first of Burleigh's illustrations for "La Belle Dame sans Merci" depicts a meeting with a beautiful woman who has a garland of roses adorning her hair, while the second portrays the woman seated, surrounded by her victims tied to trees. In Burleigh's first illustration the wind disturbs the woman - sending her dress billowing and hair blowing, while the belle dame in the second illustration is undisturbed by the fallen leaves collecting beneath her skirts. The male warriors and rulers are strung up in trees, completely defenceless, a dystopian vision of masculinity on the eve of modern warfare. What's more, the arabesque Art Nouveau pattern on the belle dame's dress presents the female antagonist as "current".

Burleigh also illustrated plays by Shakespeare. The Chira from the late 1920s is a typical Burleigh tempera painting. It is thought there could be a literary connection to this piece. The painting is very decorative, placing it within her Renaissance revival paintings. The model is likely to have been Burleigh's daughter Veronica, while the flowers and medieval city are figments of the artist's imagination.

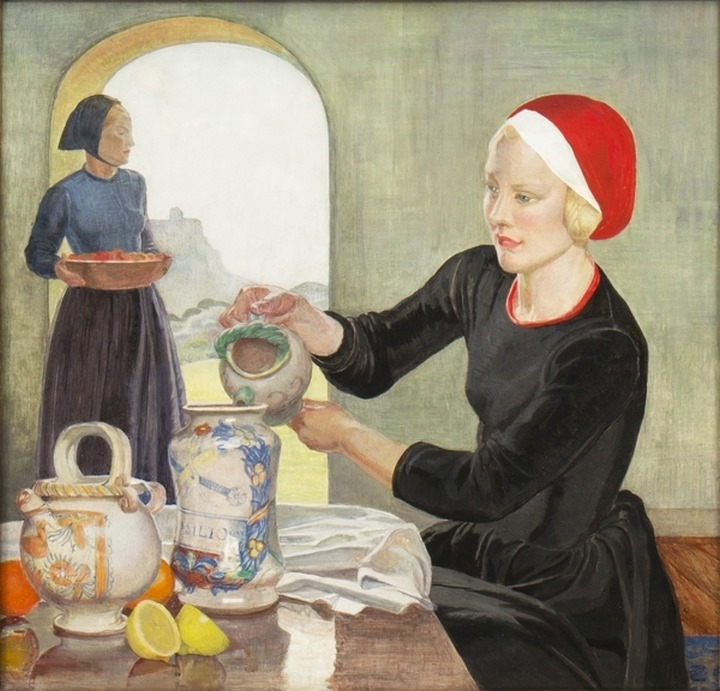
"The Still Room"

The Still Room (1928) is a later tempera painting by Burleigh in which she uses her daughter Veronica as the model. The painting is an example of Burleigh's use of a saturated colour palette, in comparison to her early illustrations for Keats's poetry, and the use of colour to direct the viewer's eye diagonally through the painting. In the summer of 1933, the painting was exhibited at the Royal Academy in London.

== Exhibitions ==
Burleigh exhibited throughout her career, including at the Royal Academy in London, at the Royal Scottish Academy in Edinburgh, the Society of Women Artists, with the New English Art Club, the Royal Cambrian Academy, Sussex Women's Art Club, the Walker Art Gallery and at the Paris Salon. From 1912 to 1945 she was a regular exhibitor at the Royal Academy, which included showing a series of 17 tempera paintings there between 1930 and 1935. Burleigh also contributed to the 1913 Arts and Crafts Society exhibition held at the Grovesnor Galleries.
