= Burleigh, Gloucestershire =

Settlement in Gloucestershire, England

Burleigh
- Location within Gloucestershire
- OS grid reference: SO8601
- Civil parish: Minchinhampton
- District: Stroud
- Shire county: Gloucestershire
- Region: South West
- Country: England
- Sovereign state: United Kingdom
- Police: Gloucestershire
- Fire: Gloucestershire
- Ambulance: South Western
- UK Parliament: North Cotswolds

Burleigh is a suburban area in Minchinhampton, Gloucestershire, England, in Stroud local government district. it lies on the south side of the Thames and Severn Canal, opposite Brimscombe.

== Notes and references ==
- British Place Names
