= Adam Burley =

Philosopher

Adam Burley (died 1327/8) was a philosopher educated at University College, Oxford.

Adam is responsible for two questions commentaries, preserved uniquely in Cambridge, Gonville and Caius College, MS 668*/645:

- Quaestiones I–II de Anima, on the De anima of Aristotle; or The Commission continued the work I and II de Anima, De Anima Aristotle.
- Quaestiones de Sex principiis, on the Liber sex principiorum, a medieval expansion of the Categories. or The Commission continued the work de sex principiis, in Liber sex principium, the medieval expansion of categories.

His work appears in the manuscript with the work of other Oxford scholars, including Walter Burley, Richard Campsall, and Peter Bradele.
