= Robert Burley =

Canadian photographer (born 1957)

Robert Burley (born March 18, 1957) is a Canadian photographer of architecture and the urban landscape. He is based in Toronto, Canada, and is a Fellow of the Royal Society of Canada.

== Life and work ==
Robert Burley grew up in rural Ontario in the town of Picton. He studied Media Studies at Ryerson Polytechnical Institute (now Toronto Metropolitan University), Toronto (BAA 1980) and later pursued graduate studies in photography at the School of the Art Institute of Chicago (MFA 1986).

While living in Chicago, Burley trained briefly with Hedrich-Blessing Photographers before returning to Toronto to establish Design Archive, a firm specializing in architectural photography.

From 1997 to 2021, Burley was a professor at Ryerson University's School of Image Arts where he helped create new programs and resources related to photography. These include his contributions to the creation of Ryerson Library's Special Collections, the acquisition of the Black Star (photo agency) Collection, and his role as one of the founding Program Directors of the graduate program in Film + Photographic Preservation.

Throughout his career, Burley has completed numerous commissioned and self-directed multi-year projects realized as books and exhibitions. These include:

- O’Hare: Airfield on the Prairie (Chicago History Museum 1989)
- Viewing Olmsted: Photographs by Robert Burley, Lee Friedlander and Geoffrey James (Canadian Centre for Architecture 1997) ISBN 0262621169
- The Disappearance of Darkness: Photography at the end of the analog era (Princeton Architectural Press 2014) ISBN 9781616890957
- An Enduring Wilderness: Toronto’s Natural Parklands (ECW Press 2017) ISBN 9781770413795
- An Accidental Wilderness: The Origins and Ecology of Toronto’s Tommy Thompson Park (University of Toronto Press 2020) ISBN 9781487508340

== Selected Collections ==
- National Gallery of Canada
- Yale University Art Gallery
- Art Gallery of Hamilton
- George Eastman Museum
- Library Archives Canada
- Fotomuseum Antwerpen
- Canadian Centre for Architecture
- Chicago History Museum
- City of Toronto Archives
- Doris McCarthy Gallery, University of Toronto
- Musée Nicéphore Niépce, France
- Musée des Beaux-Arts de Montréal
- Ryerson Image Centre
- Vancouver Art Gallery

== Awards ==
- 2010: Mellon Senior Fellow – Canadian Centre for Architecture
- 2018: Fellow of the Royal Society of Canada
- 2018: Planning Excellence Award – Publication, Canadian Institute of Planners
- 2020: Award of Excellence – Research – The Canadian Society of Landscape Architects
- 2021: Heritage Toronto Award – Book – Accidental Wilderness: The Origins and Ecology of Toronto's Tommy Thompson Park
