= Bewdley (disambiguation) =

Bewdley is a town in Worcestershire, England.

Bewdley may also refer to:

- Bewdley, Ontario, Canada
- Bewdley (St. Stephens Church, Virginia), United States, a plantation
- Bewdley (UK Parliament constituency), a former constituency in Worcestershire, England
