= Burley-Sekem =

Australian sports equipment company

- Type: Private
- Industry: Sports equipment
- Founded: 1985; 41 years ago (merger)
- Founder: Joe Burley
- Headquarters: Perth, Australia
- Products: Australian footballs, cricket balls, sportswear
- Website: sekem.com.au

Burley-Sekem Pty Ltd is an Australian sports equipment manufacturing company. It was formed in 1985 from the merger of "Burley Sports Pty Ltd" (an Australian footballs and cricket balls manufacturer, established in 1907), and "Sekem Pty Ltd." (a sportswear and school uniform manufacturer founded in 1923). The company has since merged with Kookaburra Sport.

The company produces equipment and goods for clubs and teams of diverse sports, such as Australian rules football, rugby, cricket and soccer, having also endorsed several major leagues.

== History ==
=== Burley ===
The "Burley Football Company" was started in 1906 by carpenter and former tanner's apprentice, Joe Burley, who was requested to make a ball that "kept its shape" for the Western Australian Football Association (WAFA). Previously, rugby balls had been used for the sport, but these were easily worn and prone to changing shape from a prolate spheroid to a sphere by the completion of matches. Burley's ball was first tried in a WAFA game between East Fremantle and West Perth in June 1906, and gained popularity amongst players, leading to it being exclusively used by the WAFL from 1921, a practice which continues to this day. The ball was introduced to the South Australian National Football League (SANFL) in the 1920s, and is the official ball. Along with the Sherrin, the Burley football was declared the official football of the Australian National Football Council (ANFC). The Burley was also used in interstate and carnival matches featuring Western Australia.

=== Sekem ===
Sekem commenced operations in 1923 as a sock manufacturing business. The business survived the Great Depression and the Second World War, expanding into sportswear, swimwear and school uniforms, become Australia's largest manufacturer of school uniforms by the 1970s.

== Products ==
Burley-Sekem is best known for its manufacture of Burley footballs, which are used and endorsed by the West Australian Football League. In Western Australia, particularly, the ball is considered almost ubiquitous.

Burley-Sekem is responsible for the production of licensed AFL, NRL, WAFL, Wallabies, All Blacks, Super Rugby, Socceroos and A-League sports clothing, and also produces Dukes Cricket Balls and Burley Indoor Cricket Balls.

In November 2020, the Fremantle Football Club announced that Burley-Sekem would supply their playing guernseys and other apparel for the 2021 AFL season and onwards.

== See also ==
- List of companies named after people
