= Burleigh House, Westminster =

Historic building in England

Coordinates: 51.5113°N 0.1198°W

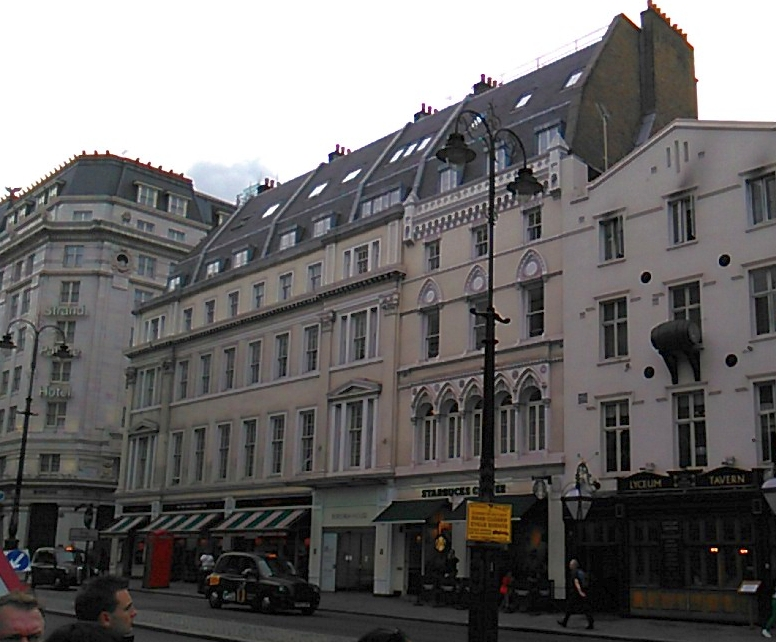
Burleigh House

Burleigh House is a historic building in the City of Westminster, Greater London, United Kingdom. It is located at 355 on The Strand. It was built in the 18th century. It has been Grade II listed since May 1, 1986.
