= Berlei =

Australian women's underwear brand

- Product type: Lingerie
- Current owner: BBFIT Investments Pte Ltd
- Country: Australia
- Introduced: 1917; 109 years ago
- Website: https://www.berlei.com.au/

Berlei is an Australian women's lingerie and underwear brand.

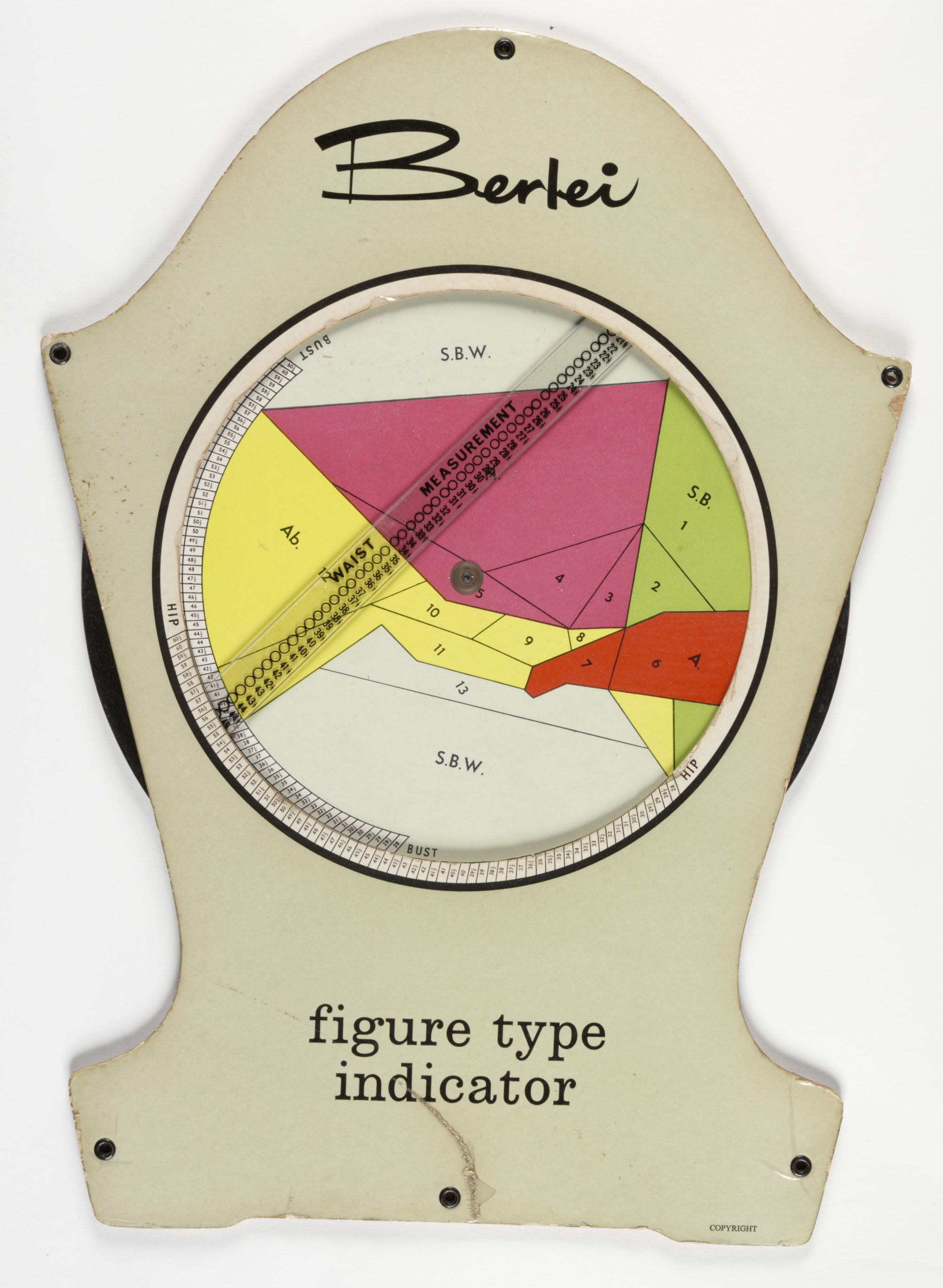

== Founder ==
Frederick R. Burley (29 May 1885, Hamilton, Victoria – 26 May 1954, Wahroonga, New South Wales) was the founder of Berlei.

Burley was a pioneer in employee relations and an accomplished public citizen, holding office in the Rotary Club and contributing to other organizations. In the custom of Rotary he would introduce himself to other clubs with his name, his club, and his occupation as a "maker of jewel caskets".

In 1923, he founded the Australia Made Preference League and served as the first president of the League. The League created the Great White Train as a promotional tool for early Australian industries.

He travelled to learn business and trade information, to make business partnerships, and to get materials for his factories.

The movie Undercover was made about the early years of the Berlei company and the life of Frederick R Burley.

== History ==
Berlei Limited was started in 1910, as a company called Unique Corsets in Sydney, after Burley discovered that the corset business was profitable and that the wholesale segment of the business could be prosecuted on an import replacement basis. Burley made his first overseas business trip to the USA in 1913, to research methods and investigate the use of machinery of the time. The 'frenchified' brand name of Berlei was conceptualized soon after and was registered in Australia in 1917. (While this might reasonably be accordingly pronounced after the French style as 'bur-LAY', it is commonly still pronounced as if written 'burley'.) United Corsets became Berlei Limited in 1920.

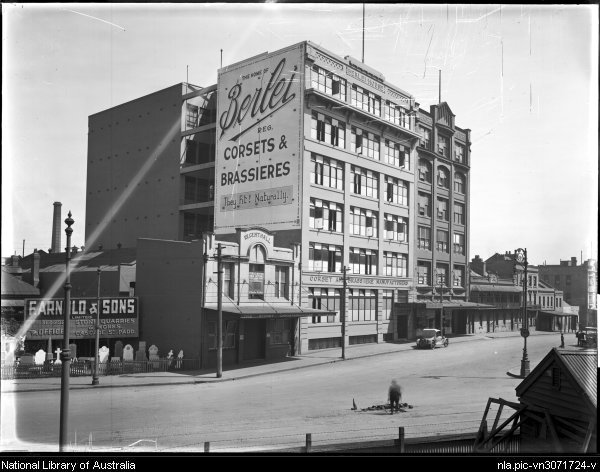
Berlei House in Regent Street, Sydney

The original factory was in Wilmot Street, Sydney with additional space being used in Liverpool Street. In January 1922, the factory was moved to Berlei House in Regent Street.

Burley's vision for the company was "To Design and Manufacture Corsets and Brassieres of such perfect Fit, Quality, and Workmanship, as will bring pleasure and profit to all concerned, while at the same time rendering such excellent service to our Clients and Consumers as will merit their permanent patronage".

Berlei's approach to marketing was professional. Berlei conducted a research project to quantify Australian 'figure types'.

In July 2026, Berlei was purchased by BBFIT Investments, as part of a $700 million acquisition deal that included Bonds, Bras N Things, and Sheridan.

=== Berlei (NZ) Limited ===
Berlei Limited was one of the first Australian companies to expand outside Australia. Berlei (New Zealand) Limited was started in 1923, with a staff of fifty growing to 665 employees in 1961.

Bendon Berlei Limited merged with Ceramco Apparel Group Limited on 8 April 1981.

=== Berlei (UK) Limited ===
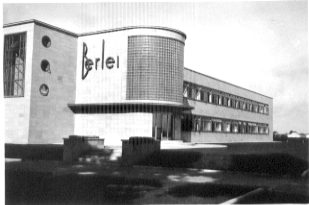
Berlei UK factory at Slough

A branch of the Australian company was opened in the United Kingdom in 1930, with staff of forty. The company grew to a staff of 702 in 1961.

A 'modern' factory was built in Slough in 1937, it was demolished in 1984.

Berlei (UK) was purchased from Berlei Hestia of Australia in 1982.

Berlei (UK) called in a receiver in November 1985, subsequently it was purchased by Courtaulds Textiles.

In March 2000, Courtaulds Textiles was sold to Sara Lee. Sara Lee sold Courtaulds Textiles to Hong Kong–based PD Enterprise Limited in May 2006.
