= Burly =

Burly Бурлы
- Selo
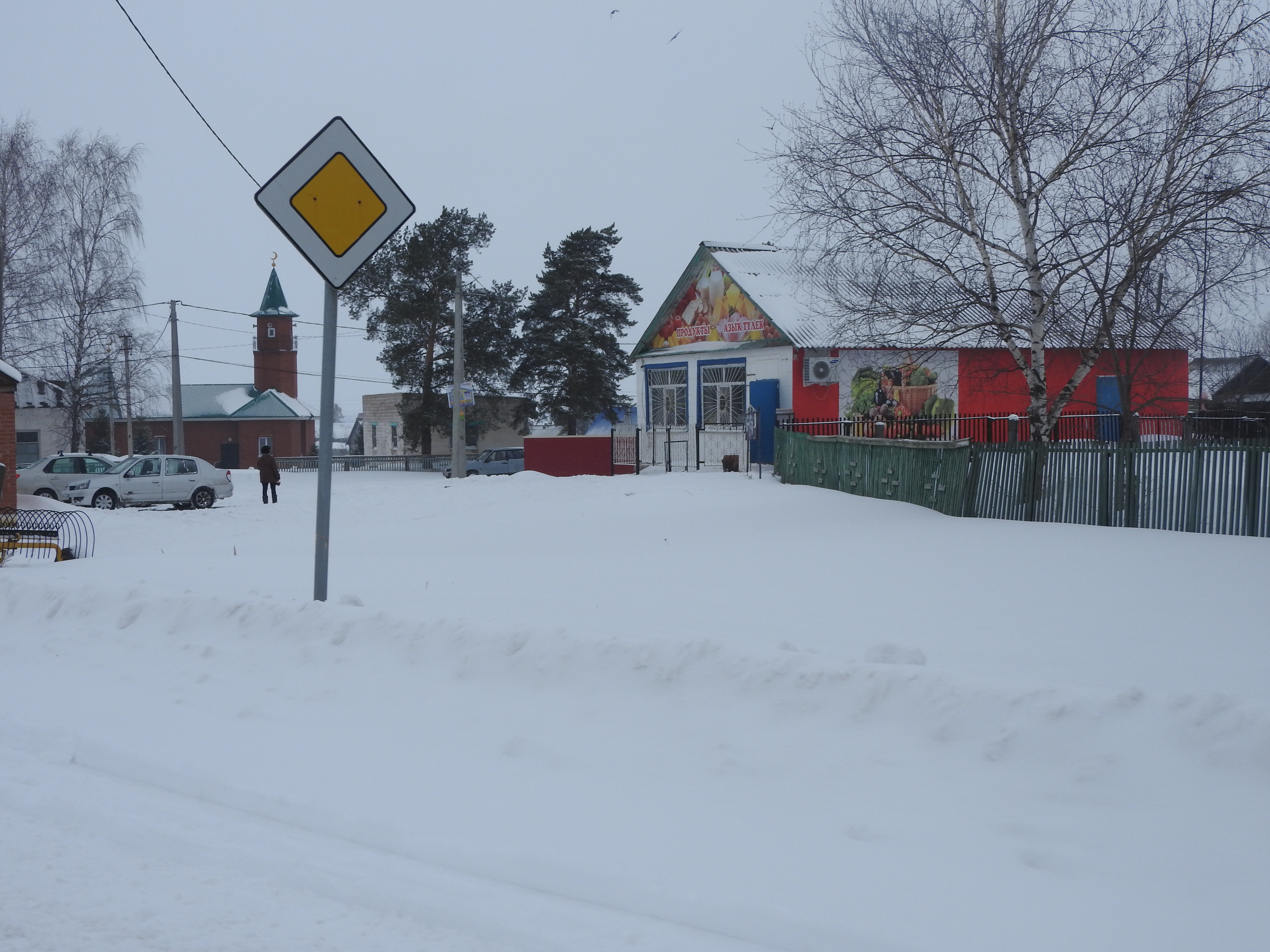

- Location within Bashkortostan Location within Russia
- Coordinates: 54°07′N 56°28′E
- Country: Russia
- Region: Bashkortostan
- District: Gafuriysky District
- Time zone: UTC+5:00

Burly (Russian: Бурлы; Bashkir: Бурлы, Burlı) is a rural locality (a selo) and the administrative centre of Burlinsky Selsoviet, Gafuriysky District, Bashkortostan, Russia. The population was 539 as of 2010. There are 10 streets.

== Geography ==
Burly is located 31 km north of Krasnousolsky (the district's administrative centre) by road. Yavgildy is the nearest rural locality.
