= Palazzo Magnani =

Palazzo Magnani can refer to several buildings in Italy:

- Palazzo Magnani, Bologna, also referred to as Palazzo Magnani Salem
- Palazzo Magnani Feroni, Florence
- Palazzo Magnani, Reggio Emilia, also referred to as Palazzo Becchi Magnani
