= Bivange =

Town in the commune of Roeser in Luxembourg

Coordinates: 49°33′N 6°08′E

Bivange (French pronunciation: [bivɑ̃ʒ]; Luxembourgish: Béiweng, German: Bivingen [ˈbiːvɪŋən]) is a small town in the commune of Roeser, in southern Luxembourg. It is known for being the birthplace of Luxembourgish American photographer Edward Steichen. As of September 2026, the town has a population of 1,186.

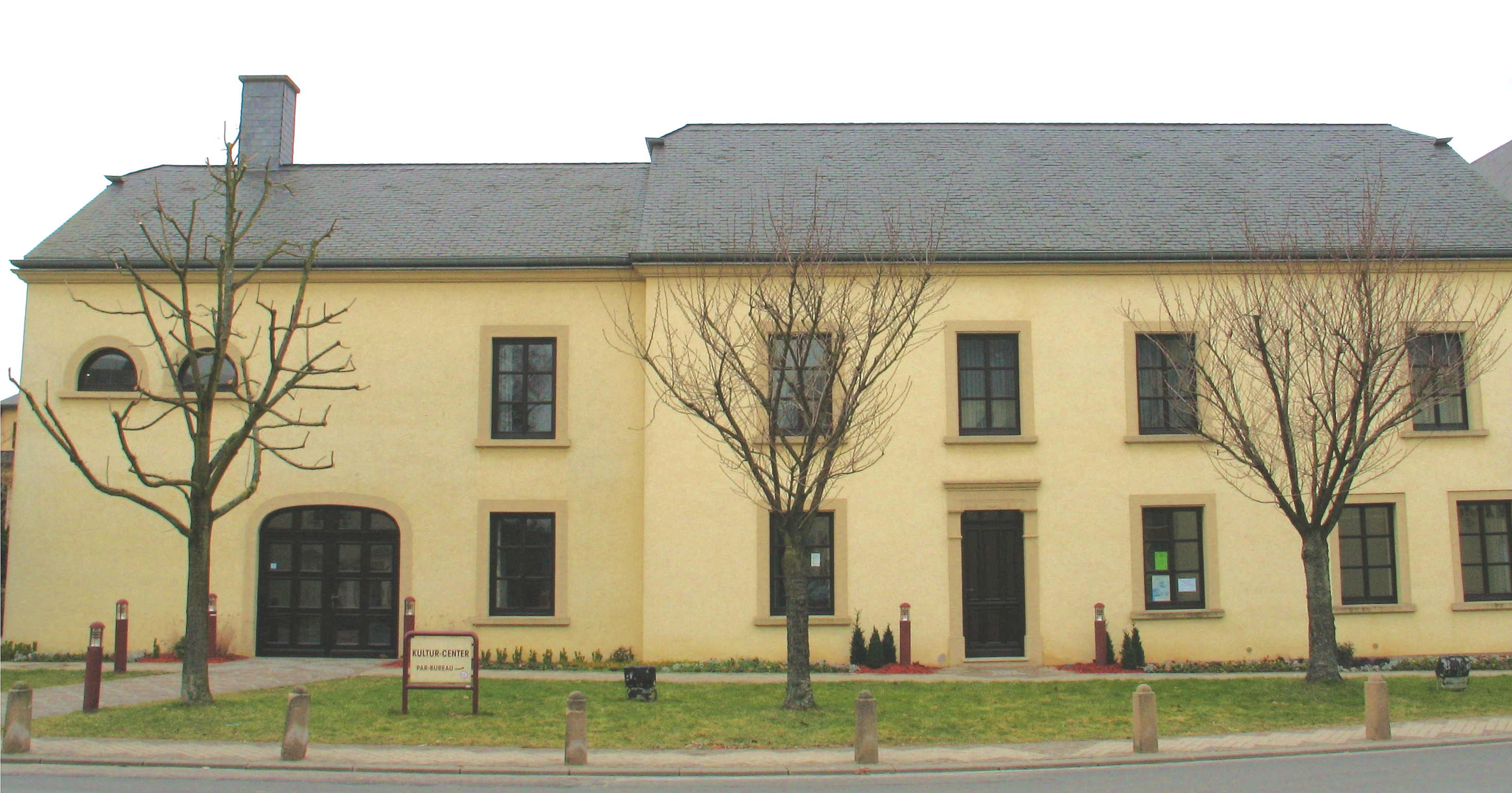
The cultural center
