= Roeser =

Roeser Réiser (Luxembourgish)
- Commune
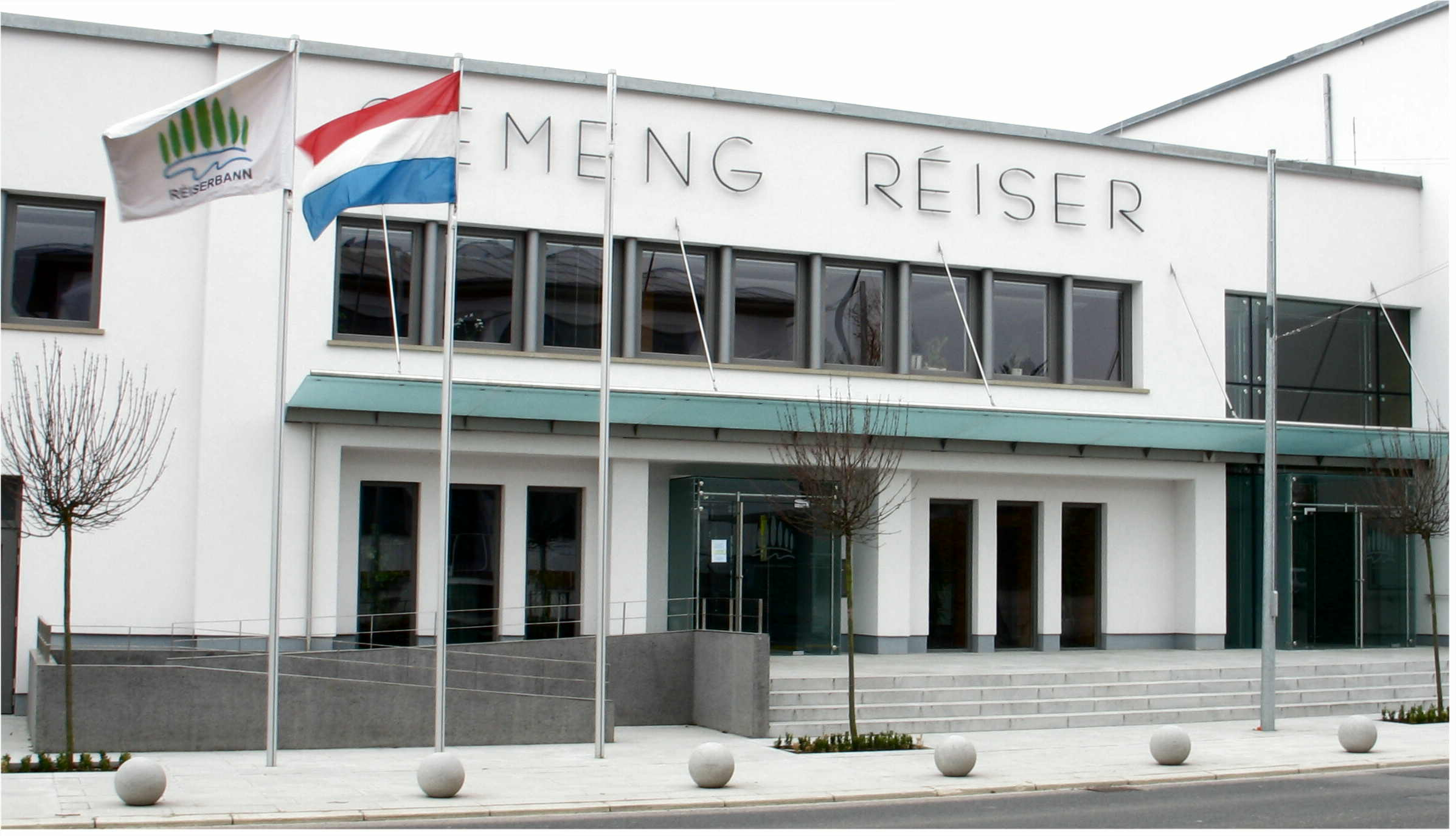
- Town hall

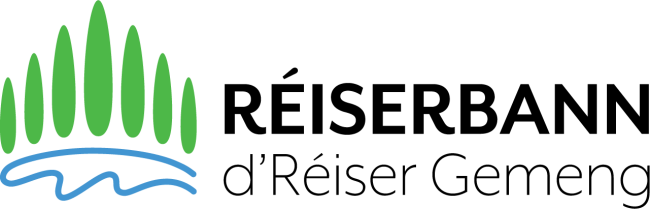
- Coat of arms Brandmark

- Map of Luxembourg with Roeser highlighted in orange, and the canton in dark red
- Coordinates: 49.5361°N 6.1458°E
- Country: Luxembourg
- Canton: Esch-sur-Alzette

Government
  - Mayor: Tom Jungen

Area
  - Total: 23.8 km^{2} (9.2 sq mi)
  - Rank: 38th of 100
- Highest elevation: 311 m (1,020 ft)
  - Rank: 97th of 100
- Lowest elevation: 256 m (840 ft)
  - Rank: 60th of 100

Population (2026)
  - Total: 7,244
  - Rank: 22nd of 100
  - Density: 304/km^{2} (788/sq mi)
  - Rank: 27th of 100
- Time zone: UTC+1 (CET)
  - Summer (DST): UTC+2 (CEST)
- LAU 2: LU0000211
- Website: roeser.lu

Roeser (Luxembourgish: Réiser [ˈʀɜɪ̯zɐ]) is a commune and small town in southern Luxembourg. It is part of the canton of Esch-sur-Alzette. As of 2025 the commune had a population of 6,657.

As of September 2026, the town of Roeser, which lies in the north of the commune, has a population of 1,351. Other towns within the commune include Berchem, Bivange, Crauthem, Kockelscheuer, Livange, and Peppange.

== Population ==
Historical population

Year	Pop.	±%
1821	915	—
1851	1,415	+54.6%
1900	1,372	−3.0%
1910	1,393	+1.5%
1922	1,474	+5.8%
1935	1,493	+1.3%

Year	Pop.	±%
1947	1,518	+1.7%
1960	1,767	+16.4%
1970	2,281	+29.1%
1981	3,038	+33.2%
1990	3,442	+13.3%
2000	4,408	+28.1%

Year	Pop.	±%
2005	4,719	+7.1%
2010	5,159	+9.3%
2015	5,736	+11.2%
2020	6,551	+14.2%
2021	6,560	+0.1%

Source data

== Twin towns ==
Roeser is twinned with:

- Turi, Italy
- Zoufftgen, France
