= Rodin — The Thinker =

Photograph by Edward Steichen

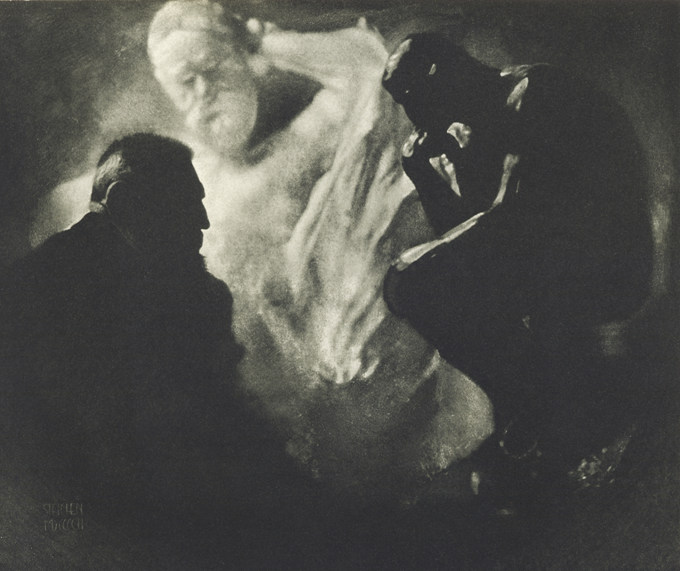
Rodin — The Thinker (1902) by Edward Steichen

Rodin — The Thinker is a pictorialist photograph made by American photographer Edward Steichen in 1902. It depicts renowned French sculptor Auguste Rodin, in his studio, facing his famous The Thinker sculpture, with his other creation, the Monument to Victor Hugo, as a background.

== History and description ==
Steichen, then a very young photographer, met Rodin on his studio in 1901, in Paris, and presented him his own work. Rodin was positively impressed and agreed to sit for Steichen. The American photographer took one year to decide how he would portray Rodin in his studio. Finally, Steichen decide to depict Rodin, seated at the left, looking to his most acclaimed creation, The Thinker, in bronze, on the right. As a background, Steichen shows Rodin's most recent work, the Monument to Victor Hugo, in white marble. Steichen had difficulty in capturing the current image in a single negative, so he took two, one presenting Rodin in front of The Thinker, and other depicting his monument to Victor Hugo, and later combined them for the final product. Steichen said of his photograph: "It is probably more of a picture to Rodin than it is of Rodin, because after all, it associates the genius of the man with that expressed by his work."

The photograph is considered one of the best Steichen created with his use of gum bichromate, achieving a very painterly quality. The Metropolitan Museum of Art website states: "The photograph portrays the sculptor in symbiotic relation to his work. Suppressing the texture of the marble and bronze and thus emphasizing the presence of the sculptures as living entities, Steichen was able to assimilate the artist into the heroic world of his creations. Posed in relief against his work, Rodin seems to contemplate in "The Thinker" his own alter ego, while the luminous figure of Victor Hugo suggests poetic inspiration as the source of his creativity."

== Public collections ==
There are prints of this photograph in several public collections, including the Musée Rodin, in Paris, the Metropolitan Museum of Art, in New York, the Philadelphia Museum of Art, the Museum of Fine Arts, in Boston, the Art Institute of Chicago, the Cleveland Museum of Art, the Museum of Fine Arts, in Houston, the J. Paul Getty Museum, in Los Angeles, and the National Gallery of Canada, in Ottawa.
