= Joanna Steichen =

American author and wife of photographer Edward Steichen (1933–2010)

Joanna T. Steichen (February 22, 1933 – July 24, 2010), née Joanna E. Taub, was an American author, psychotherapist, and aide to her husband, photographer Edward Steichen.

== Biography ==
Joanna E. Taub was born to a dental surgeon on February 22, 1933, in Greenpoint, Brooklyn. She grew up in Albany, New York then attended Smith College, where she majored in theater and graduated in 1954. She met Edward Steichen in 1959 when she was 26 and he was 80. They married the following year. She worked with him to mount exhibits and write his autobiography and ultimately arranged the donation of his collection to the George Eastman Museum. After he died in 1973, she went back to school, earning a master’s degree at Columbia University’s School of Social Work and then practicing as a psychotherapist. In 1983, she published a non-fiction book called Marrying Up: An American Dream and Reality and in 2000, a survey of Edward Steichen’s work called Steichen’s Legacy: Photographs: 1895-1973, in conjunction with a retrospective at the Whitney Museum. Steichen’s Legacy presented 315 of his photographs grouped thematically, with each group prefaced by a personal essay.

As of 1986, she lived on West 29th Street in Manhattan. She died by drowning on July 24, 2010, at her summer home in Montauk, New York, after suffering from Parkinson's disease.
