= The Flatiron (photograph) =

Photograph by Edward Steichen

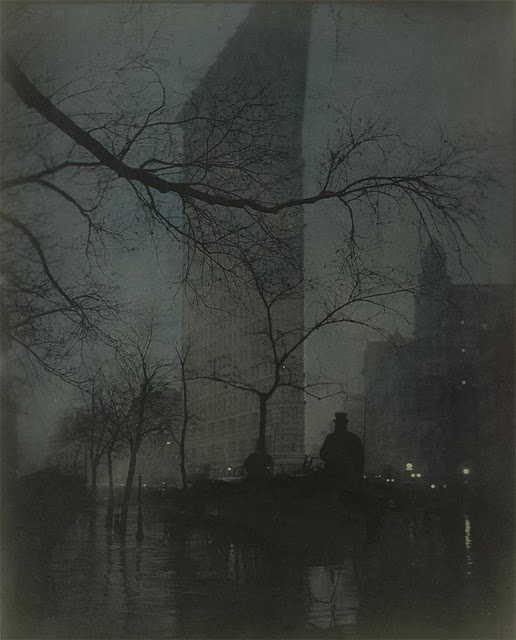
- Artist: Edward Steichen
- Year: 1904, printed 1909
- Medium: Blue-green pigment gum bichromate over platinum print
- Dimensions: 18 13/16 x 15 1/8 in. (47.8 x 38.4 cm)
- Location: Metropolitan Museum of Art, New York

The Flatiron is a colored photograph made by Luxembourgish American photographer Edward Steichen. The photograph depicts the recently erected Flatiron Building in New York, taking inspiration from fellow photographers like Alfred Stieglitz, who had just photographed the building a year prior. The original negative was made in 1904 and spawned three platinum-gum exhibition prints in brown (1905), blue-green (1909), and yellow-green-black (1904–1909; uncertain).

Using different proportions of pigments in each gum process, Steichen was able to create these three unique platinum-gum prints. The photograph's most notable variant is the blue-green version, which, according to Penelope Niven, became "widely reproduced from 1909 onward" because of its intense color contrasts. The significance of the prints as a whole comes from how they showcase what Niven refers to as the "artistic potential" of photography. The work is one of the best-known photographs of Steichen's Pictorialist phase.

== History and description ==
The Flatiron Building had been inaugurated in 1902 and would become one of the most iconic buildings of New York. Its wedge-shaped design and prime location in the Photo District (now the Flatiron District) made the building highly distinctive. According to Mary Woods, it became a trademark of new American culture by "[breaking] free from the plat of nineteenth-century Manhattan." It soon attracted the attention of photographers like Alfred Stieglitz and Edward Steichen, who were trying to create photographs in the Pictorialist style, which emulated painting.

Woods also asserted that Steichen, taking after Stieglitz, wanted to show the building as a "collision of the present with the past and future...neither inert nor fixed". Having experimented with multiple vantage points to accomplish this, he eventually settled on the angle from the west side of Madison Square Park. Woods described the image from this view as "the Flatiron at twilight on rain-slicked streets" with a branch coming in from the upper-left to pay homage to the popular Japanese ukiyo-e woodprints Steichen had seen during his recent trip to Paris. Meanwhile, Malcolm Daniel related Steichen's coloristic choices to the color range of James McNeill Whistler's Nocturnes paintings to create rather "moody woodland scenes". Despite the presence of both foreign and domestic influences, Steichen's photographs were decidedly modern for their time and unique to the American feel.

== Printing process and dating ==
As a painter himself before getting into photography, Steichen wanted to show twilight in a capacity beyond the colors that were available at that time for printing. Starting with a platinum print of the same negative, he mixed printing and painting techniques by brushing different pigments — achieved by experimenting with pigment proportions and mixing watercolor with potassium bichromate and gum arabic — over the platinum to create three coloristically significant prints in brown, blue-green, and yellow-green-black.

Based on Niven's research, the first of these prints — "brown pigment gum-bichromate on what appeared to be gelatine silver" — dates to 1905 due to its back inscription of "STEICHEN MDCCCCY." Meanwhile the second — "blue-green pigment gum-bichromate over platinum" — was printed in 1909, as listed in a 1910 exhibition catalog. The third print — "gelatine silver touched with yellow, green, and black" — dates from sometime between 1904 and 1909.

== Interpretation and reception ==
According to Woods, Steichen had originally intended the prints to be seen as "timeless Platonic entities" before Stieglitz saw their promise as "after-images about temporal displacement, sequentiality, supersession, and engagement." According to Malcolm Daniel, Steichen considered the prints "old-fashioned" compared to Stieglitz's 1925–1934 Equivalents, and Steichen told the Met curator that he would not hold it against him if he were to decide against keeping those photographs in the collection.

Phyllis Rose cites one critic who described The Flatiron as a "baroque splendor," "formal perfection," and "a moody evocation of urban glamour." Mary Woods called them "as unique as paintings." However, despite generally positive reviews of the prints, some have criticized Steichen for not being as dedicated to capturing urban change as Stieglitz. Woods notes that Steiglitz himself did not entirely approve of his mentee-turned-friend's emphasis on "painterly effects" which he regarded as counter to "the true nature of photography".

== Art market ==
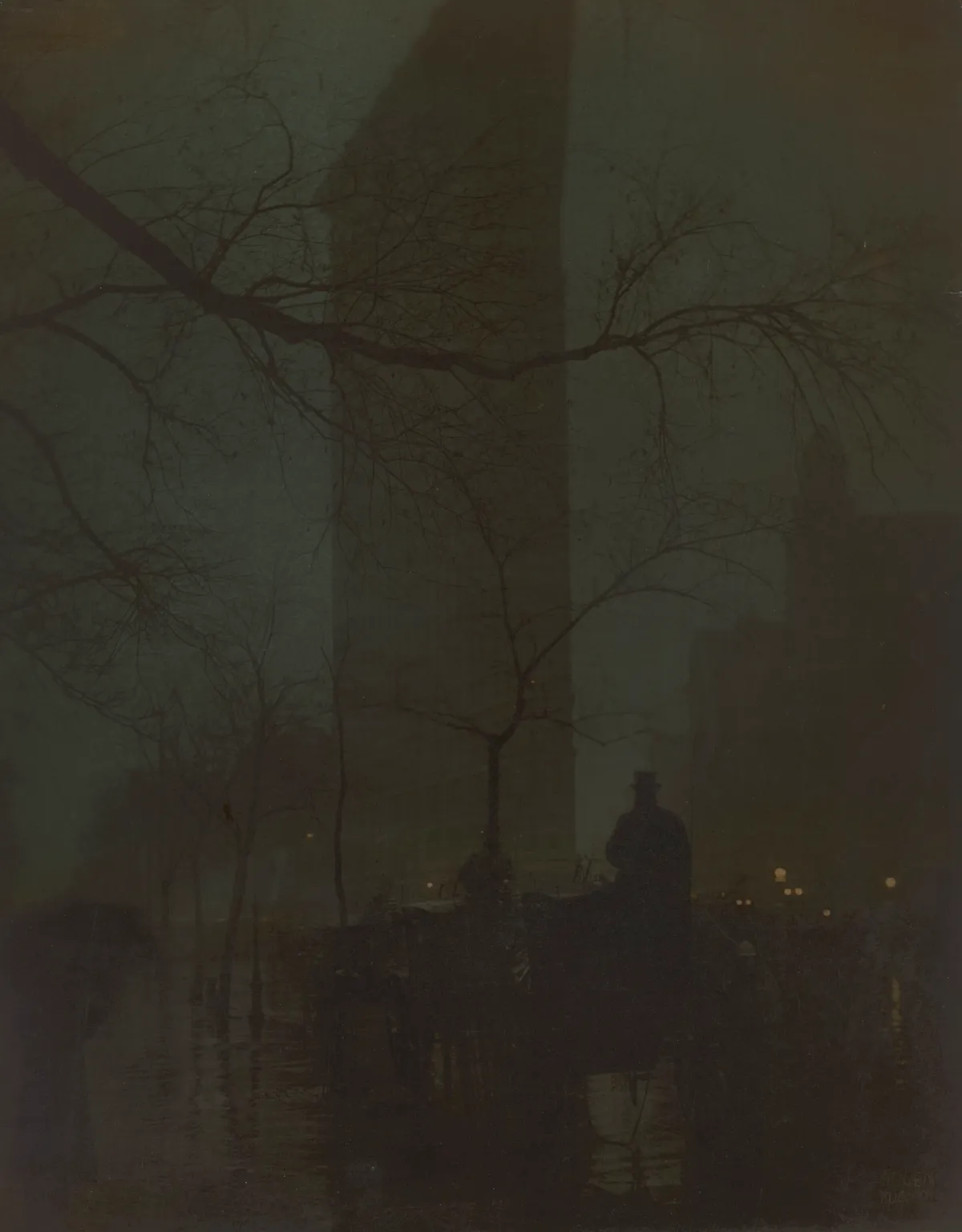
A picture of the non-exhibition fourth print privately sold by Christie's

A print of this photograph, auctioned from the Paul G. Allen Collection but originating from the Steichen family, became the second most expensive photograph ever sold on 9 November, 2022, when it sold for $11,840,000, at Christie's New York, well above the estimate of $2,000,000–3,000,000.

== Public collections ==
Today, the three platinum-gum prints are part of the Alfred Stieglitz Collection at the Metropolitan Museum of Art in New York. Gifted in 1933, this collection was Stieglitz's second bequest to the Met, which helped it to become a leading institutional collector of artistic photography. While there are prints of the image in circulation, these are three of only four platinum-gum prints in existence. Compared to other prints, platinum-gum prints are prized for their labor-intensive handmade process and the one-of-a-kind tone it produces. The fourth platinum-gum print — originating from the Steichen family and with similar back markings for authenticity — was privately sold from the Paul G. Allen Collection by Christie's in 2022.

While the only platinum-gum prints of The Flatiron reside in the Metropolitan Museum of Art in New York, there are other non-platinum-gum prints of this photograph in several public collections, including the Museum of Modern Art in New York, the Whitney Museum of American Art in New York, the Philadelphia Museum of Art in Philadelphia, the J. Paul Getty Museum in Los Angeles, the Minneapolis Institute of Art in Minneapolis, the Middlebury College Museum of Art in Middlebury, the Victoria and Albert Museum in London, and the Museo Nacional Centro de Arte Reina Sofía in Madrid.

== See also ==
- List of most expensive photographs
