= Livange =

Town in Luxembourg

Coordinates: 49°32′N 6°07′E

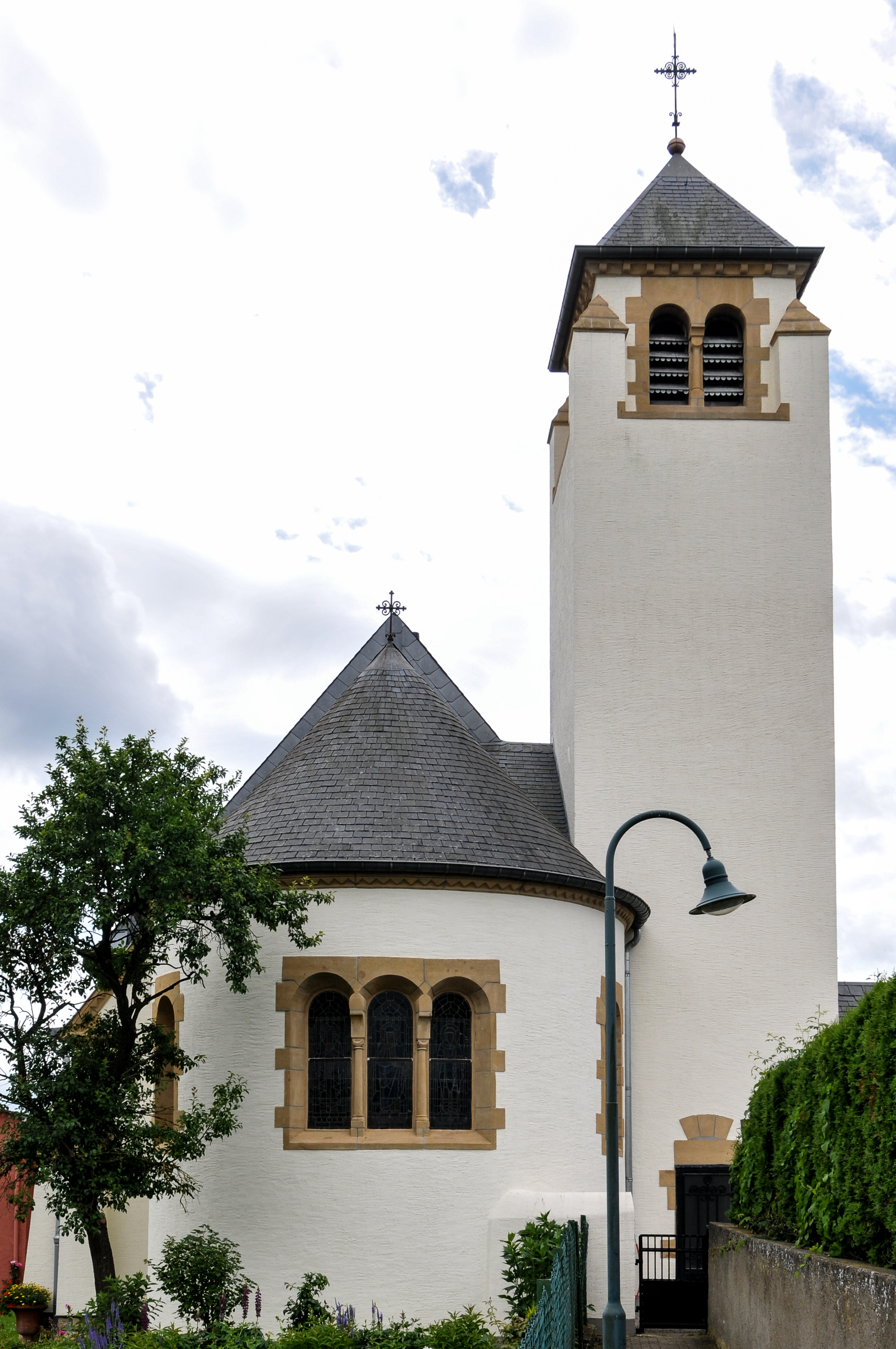

Livange (French pronunciation: [livɑ̃ʒ]; Luxembourgish: Léiweng; German: Livingen [ˈliːvɪŋən]) is a small town in the commune of Roeser, in southern Luxembourg. As of September 2026, the town has a population of 436.
