= The Pond—Moonlight =

1904 photograph by Edward Steichen

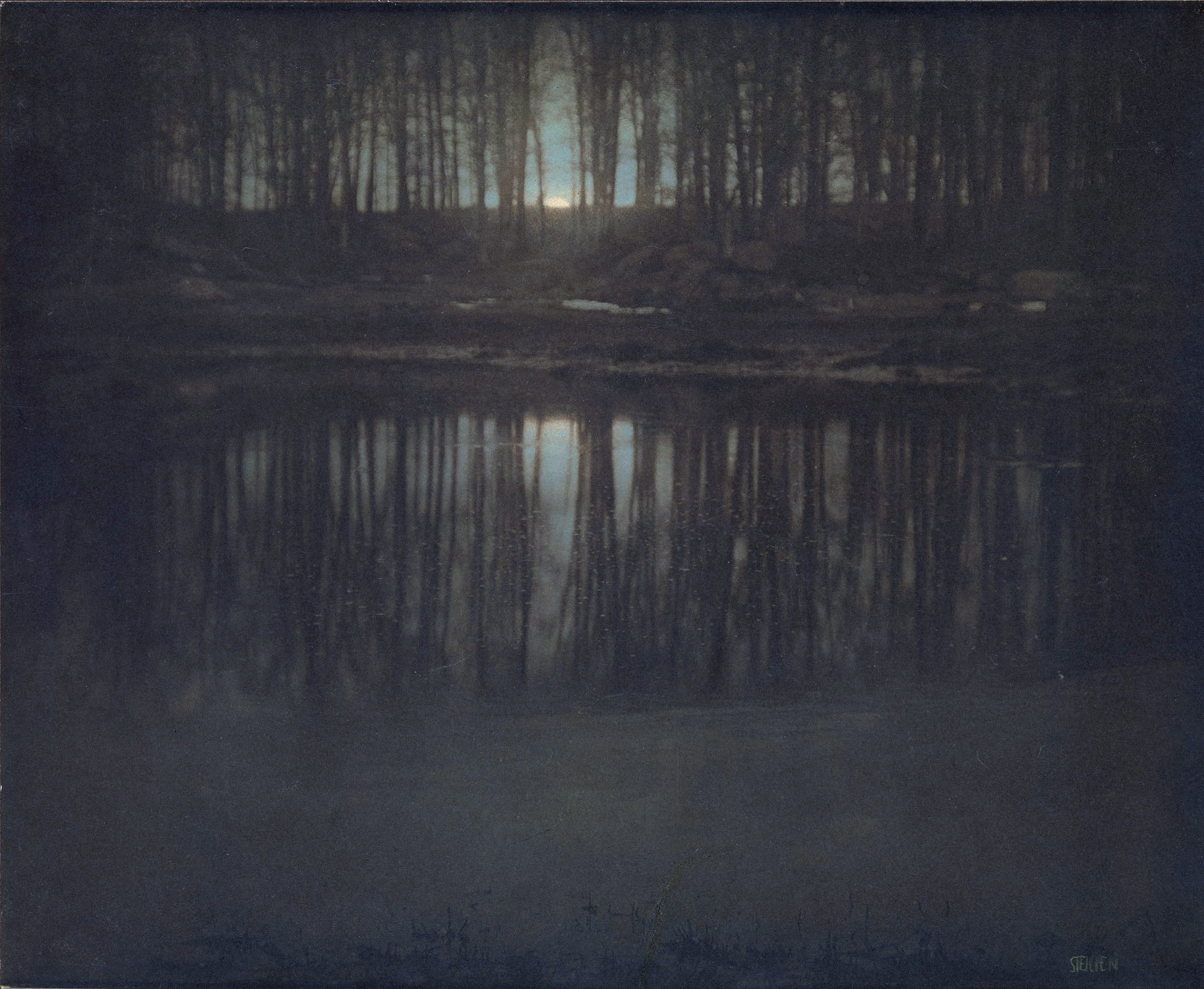
The Pond—Moonlight (1904) by Edward Steichen

The Pond—Moonlight (also exhibited as The Pond—Moonrise) is a pictorialist photograph by Edward Steichen. The photograph was made in 1904 in Mamaroneck, New York, near the home of his friend art critic Charles Caffin. The photograph features a forest across a pond, with part of the Moon appearing over the horizon in a gap in the trees. The Pond—Moonlight is an early photograph created by manually applying light-sensitive gums, giving the final print more than one color.

Only three known versions of The Pond—Moonlight are still in existence and, as a result of the hand-layering of the gums, each is unique. One version was given by Steichen to the Museum of Modern Art and remains in its collection under the title Moonrise, Mamaroneck, New York. A second version was in the personal collection of Alfred Stieglitz, which was donated to the Metropolitan Museum of Art in 1933. This had been reproduced in Stieglitz's photography journal Camera Work, No. 14 (1906).

The Metropolitan Museum of Art acquired a duplicate when it bought the Gilman Paper Company collection, and decided to auction it. In February 2006, this print of the photograph sold for US$2.9 million, at the time, the highest price ever paid for a photograph at auction. The photograph was bought by gallerist Peter MacGill on behalf of a private buyer. This auction is presented in the part 6 of the BBC documentary The Genius of Photography. The extraordinary sale price of the print is, in part, attributable to its one-of-a-kind character and to its rarity.

== See also ==
- List of most expensive photographs
- List of photographs considered the most important
