= Palazzo Becchi-Magnani =

Neoclassical-style manor in Reggio Emilia, Italy

Coordinates: 44.69712°N 10.627255°E

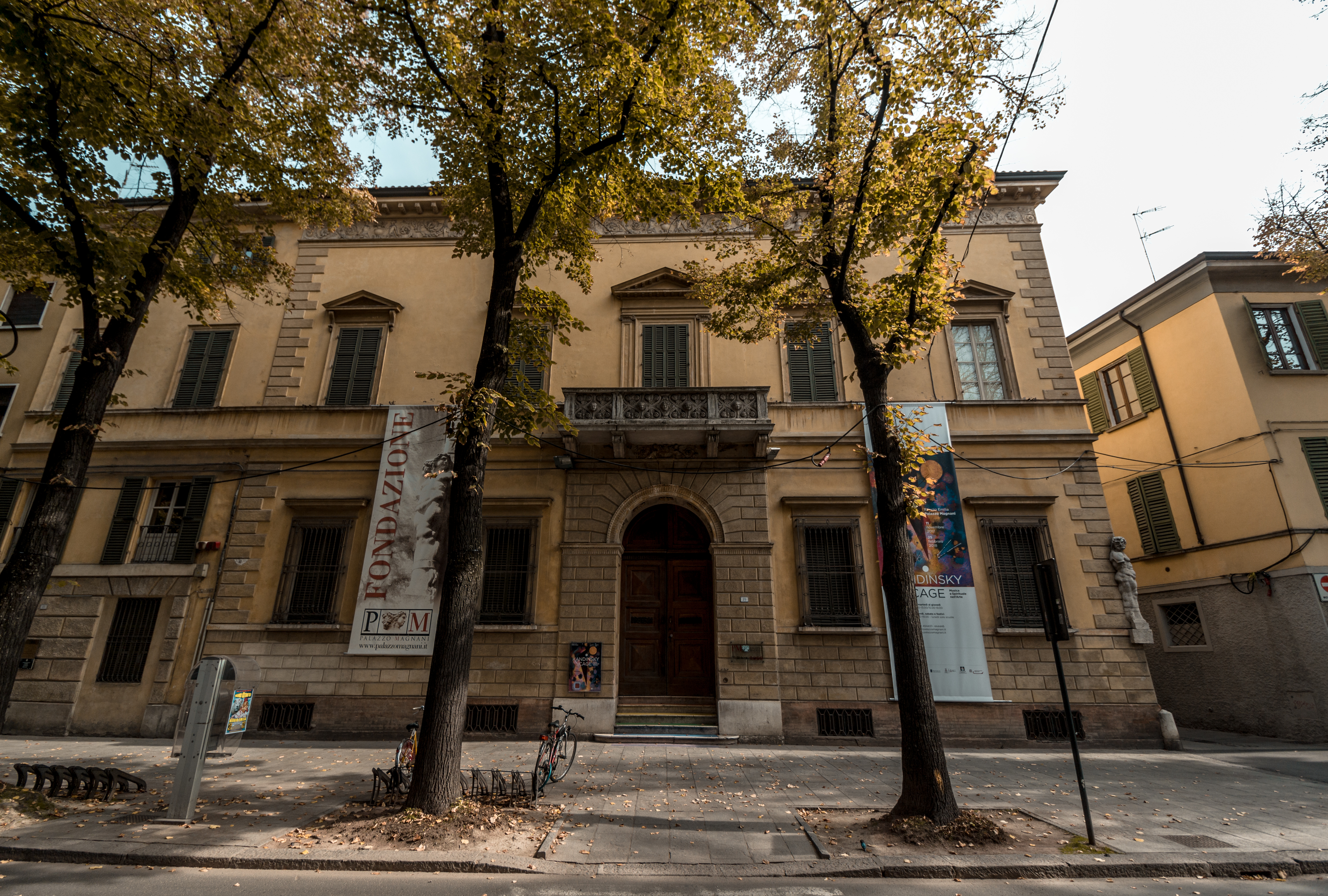

The Palazzo Magnani, also known as the Palazzo Becchi-Magnani, is a Neoclassical-style palace located on Corso Giuseppe Garibaldi 29 in the historic center of the town of Reggio Emilia in Italy.

The original palace was commissioned in the late 16th century by Count Becchi. The location on the then via della Ghiara, now Corso Garibaldi, became a fashionable location for houses of the wealthy in town. The palace is notable for a fine decorated frieze below the roofline and a marble telamon-like figure at the corner of the building, depicting the god Janus, sculpted in 1576 by Prospero Sogari .

By the early nineteenth century, ownership of the palace passed to the aristocratic Chioffi family, who refurbished the facade to its present Neoclassical style. In 1917, after various changes in ownership, the house passed to the Magnani family. Luigi Magnani endowed the Magnani-Rocca Foundation to display his art collections at his villa at Mamiano di Traversetolo. This palace, restored by Ivan Sacchetti, was purchased in 1984 by the town from the estate of Luigi Magnani, and is now used for special exhibits.
