= Victory over Japan Day =

Celebration of the end of World War II

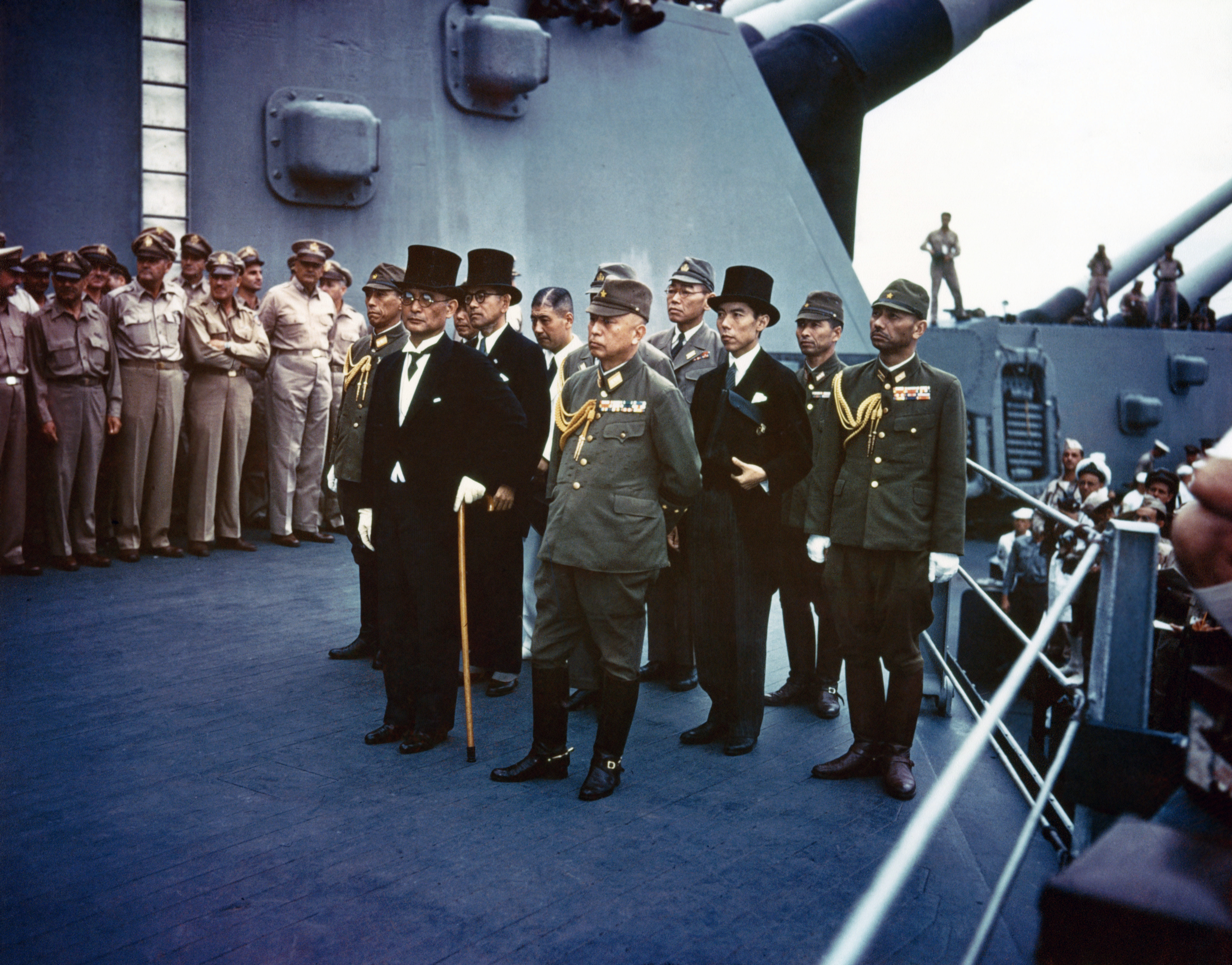
- Representatives of the Empire of Japan aboard USS Missouri at the surrender of Japan on September 2, 1945
- Also called: V-J Day, Victory in the Pacific Day, V-P Day
- Date: 15 August 1945 (Note: 14 August 1945 in the Americas and other Pacific islands due to time zone differences.); 2 September 1945
- Frequency: Annually
- Related to: Victory in Europe Day

Victory over Japan Day (also known as V-J Day, Victory in the Pacific Day, or V-P Day) is the day on which Imperial Japan surrendered in World War II, in effect bringing the war to an end. The term has been applied to both of the days on which the initial announcement of Japan's surrender was made – 15 August 1945, in Japan, and because of time zone differences, 14 August 1945 (when it was announced in the United States and the rest of the Americas and Eastern Pacific Islands) – as well as to 2 September 1945, when the surrender document was signed, officially ending World War II.

15 August is the official V-J Day for the United Kingdom, while the official US commemoration is 2 September. The name, V-J Day, had been selected by the Allies after they named V-E Day for the victory in Europe.

On 2 September 1945, formal surrender occurred aboard the battleship USS Missouri in Tokyo Bay. In Japan, August 15 usually is known as the "memorial day for the end of the war" (終戦記念日, Shūsen-kinenbi); the official name for the day, however, is "the day for mourning of war dead and praying for peace" (戦没者を追悼し平和を祈念する日, Senbotsusha o tsuitō shi heiwa o kinen suru hi). This official name was adopted in 1982 by an ordinance issued by the Japanese government.

== Surrender ==
=== Events before V-J Day ===
Within three months of the end of the war in Europe on May 9 (Moscow time), the USSR would join the Allied fight against Japan, as agreed upon at the Yalta Conference in February 1945. On August 8 (Moscow time), the Soviet Union declared war on Japan, and attacked Japanese forces not only in Manchuria on mainland Asia, but also on the Kuril islands and Sakhalin, threatening to attack and occupy Hokkaido. Already on 6 August, and again on 9 August 1945, the United States dropped atomic bombs, on Hiroshima and Nagasaki, respectively, with a "Third Shot" not possible before August 19. The Japanese government on August 10 communicated its intention to surrender under the terms of the Potsdam Declaration, but that was not yet the end of hostilities.

The news of the Japanese offer began early celebrations around the world. Allied soldiers in London danced in a conga line on Regent Street. Americans and Frenchmen in Paris paraded on the Champs-Élysées singing "Don't Fence Me In". American soldiers in occupied Berlin shouted "It's over in the Pacific", and hoped that they would now not be transferred there to fight the Japanese. Germans stated that the Japanese were wise enough—unlike themselves—to give up in a hopeless situation, and were grateful that the atomic bomb was not ready in time to be used against them. Moscow newspapers briefly reported on the atomic bombings with no commentary of any kind. While "Russians and foreigners alike could hardly talk about anything else", the Soviet government refused to make any statements on the bombs' implication for politics or science.

In Chongqing, Chinese fired firecrackers and "almost buried Americans in gratitude". In Manila, residents sang "God Bless America". On Okinawa, six men were killed and dozens were wounded as American soldiers "took every weapon within reach and started firing into the sky" to celebrate; ships sounded general quarters and fired anti-aircraft guns as their crews believed that a kamikaze attack was occurring. On Tinian island, B-29 crews preparing for their next mission over Japan were told that it was cancelled, but that they could not celebrate because it might be rescheduled for a "Third Shot".

=== Japan's acceptance of the Potsdam Declaration ===
A little after noon Japan Standard Time on 15 August 1945, Emperor Hirohito's announcement of Japan's acceptance of the terms of the Potsdam Declaration was broadcast to the Japanese people over the radio. Earlier the same day, the Japanese government had broadcast an announcement over Radio Tokyo that "acceptance of the Potsdam Proclamation [would be] coming soon", and had advised the Allies of the surrender by sending a cable to U.S. President Harry S Truman via the Swiss diplomatic mission in Washington, D.C. A nationwide broadcast by Truman was aired at seven o'clock p.m. (daylight time in Washington, D.C.) on Tuesday, 14 August, announcing the communication and that the formal event was scheduled for September 2. In his announcement of Japan's surrender on 14 August, Truman said that "the proclamation of V-J Day must wait upon the formal signing of the surrender terms by Japan".

Since the European Axis powers had surrendered three months earlier (V-E Day), V-J Day was the effective end of World War II, although a peace treaty between Japan and most of the Allies was not signed until 1952, and between Japan and the Soviet Union until 1956. In Australia, the name V-P Day (Victory in the Pacific) was used from the outset. The Canberra Times of 14 August 1945, refers to V-P Day celebrations, and a public holiday for V-P Day was gazetted by the government in that year according to the Australian War Memorial.

=== Public celebrations ===
After news of the Japanese acceptance and before Truman's announcement, civilians began celebrating "as if joy had been rationed and saved up for the three years, eight months and seven days since Sunday, Dec. 7, 1941" (the day of the Japanese attack on Pearl Harbor), Life magazine reported. In Washington, D.C. a crowd attempted to break into the White House grounds as they shouted "We want Harry!"

In San Francisco two nude women jumped into a pond at the Civic Center to soldiers' cheers. More seriously, thousands of drunken people, the vast majority of them Navy enlistees who had not served in the war theatre, embarked in what the San Francisco Chronicle summarized in 2015 as "a three-night orgy of vandalism, looting, assault, robbery, rape and murder" and "the deadliest riots in the city's history", with more than 1,000 people injured, 13 killed, and at least six women raped. None of these acts resulted in serious criminal charges, and no civilian or military official was sanctioned, leading the Chronicle to conclude that "the city simply tried to pretend the riots never happened".

The largest crowd in the history of New York City's Times Square gathered to celebrate. The victory itself was announced by a headline on the "zipper" news ticker at One Times Square, which read OFFICIAL *** TRUMAN ANNOUNCES JAPANESE SURRENDER ***; the six asterisks represented the branches of the U.S. Armed Forces. In the Garment District, workers threw out cloth scraps and ticker tape, leaving a pile five inches deep on the streets. The news of the war's end sparked a "coast-to-coast frenzy of [servicemen] kissing ... everyone in skirts that happened along," with Life publishing photographs of such kisses in Washington, Kansas City, Los Angeles, and Miami.

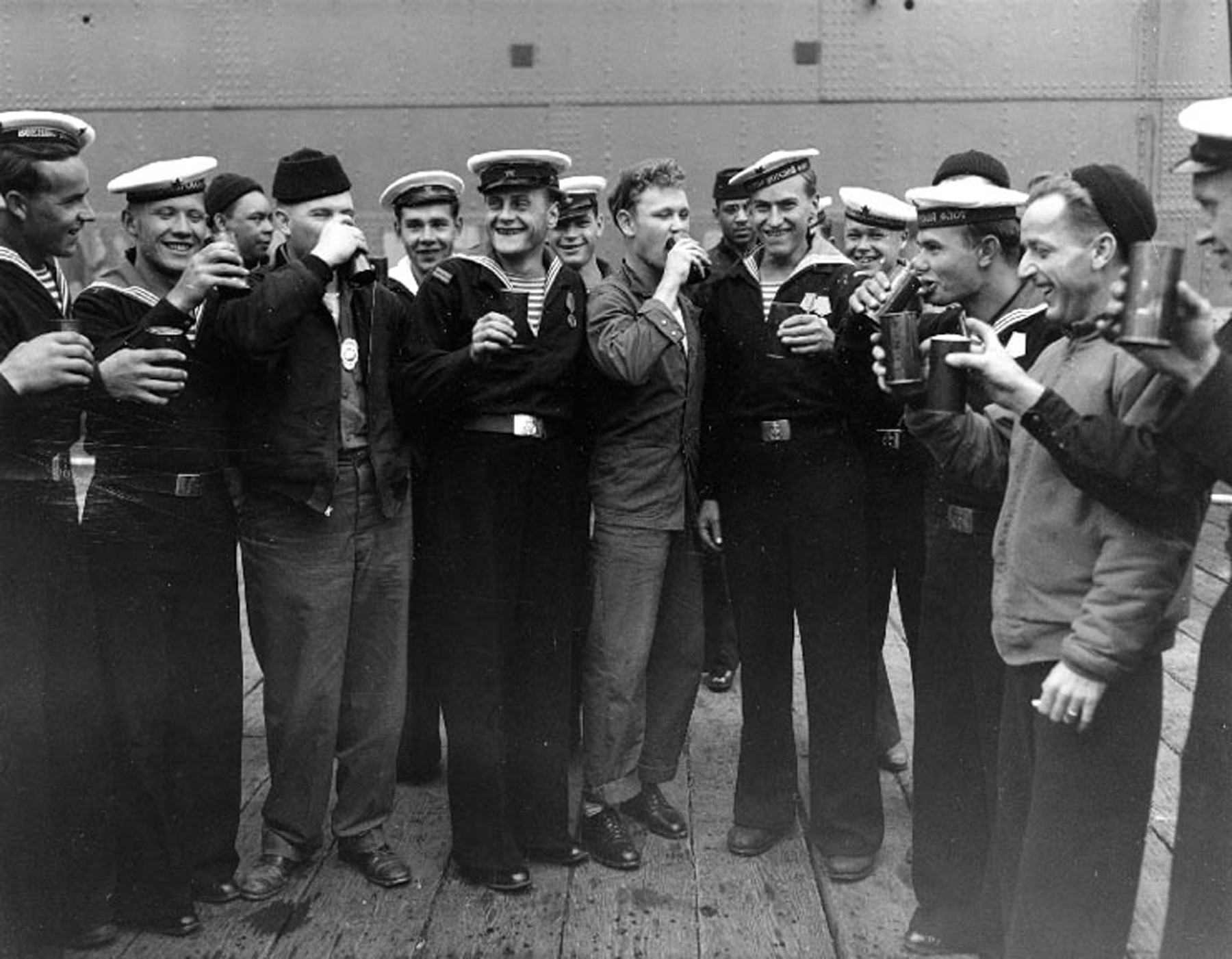
US and Soviet sailors and seamen celebrating V-J Day on August 14, 1945

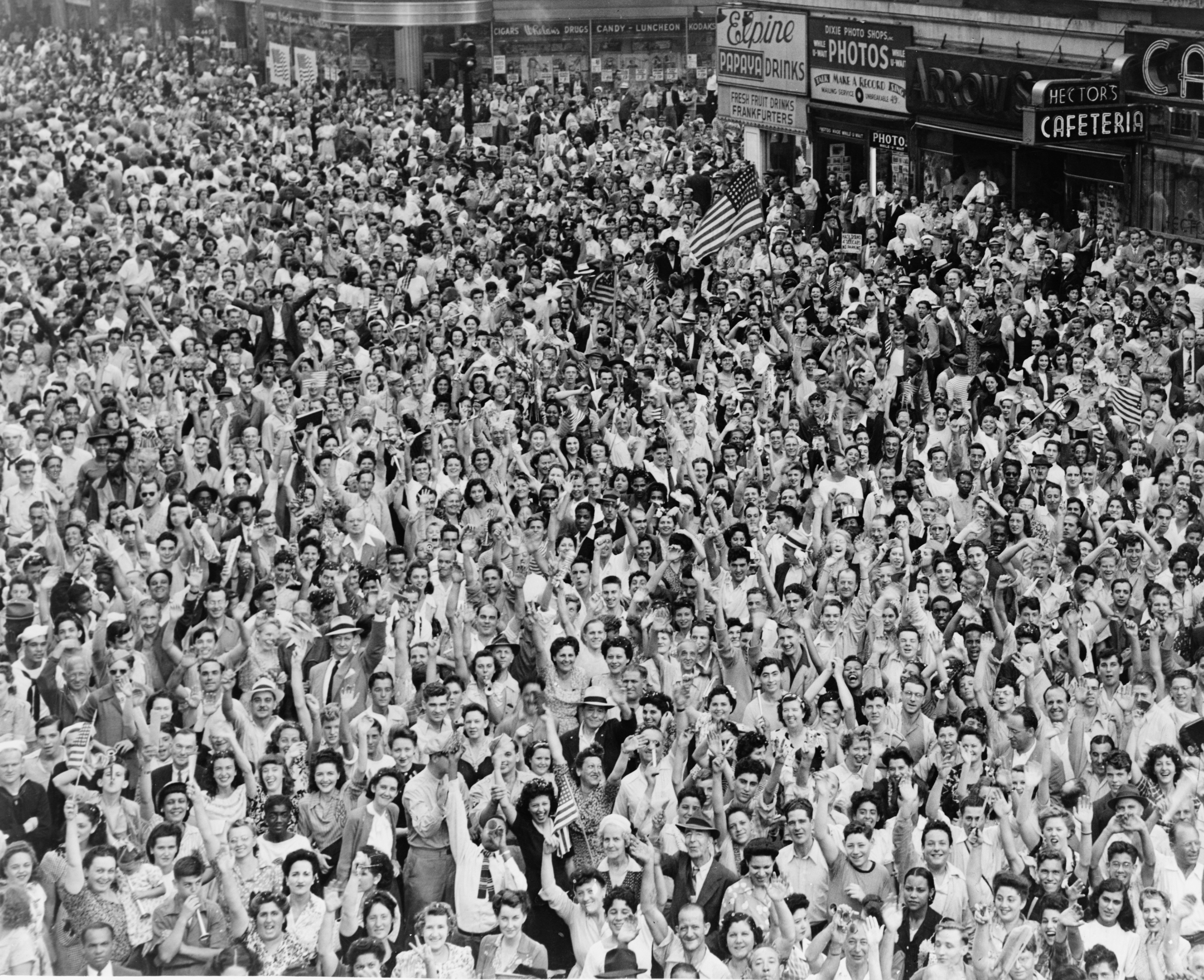
Crowds celebrating V-J Day in Times Square on August 14, 1945

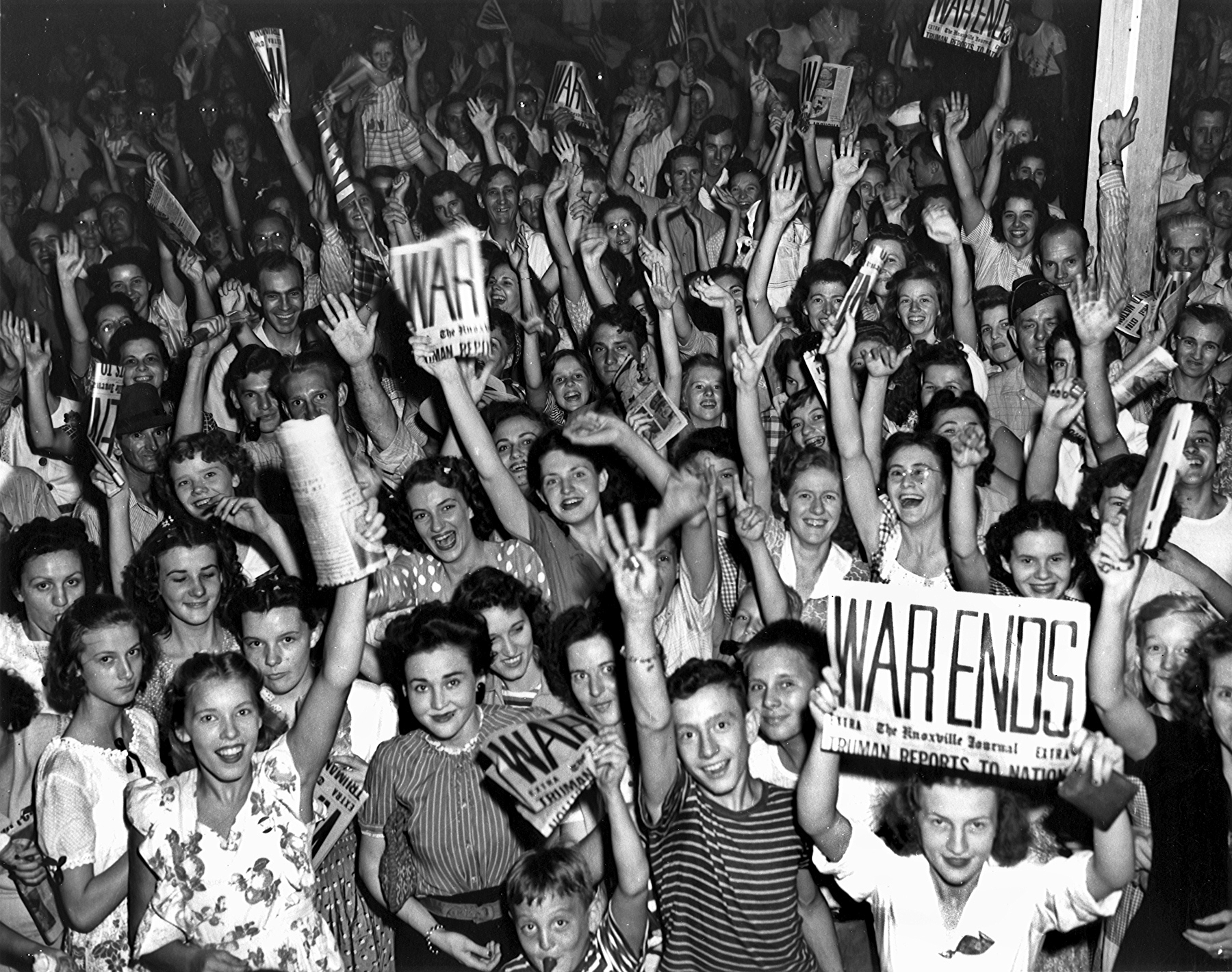
Citizens and workers of Oak Ridge, Tennessee celebrate V-J Day on August 14, 1945 (Note: Oak Ridge was part of the Manhattan Project, which resulted in the atomic bomb.)

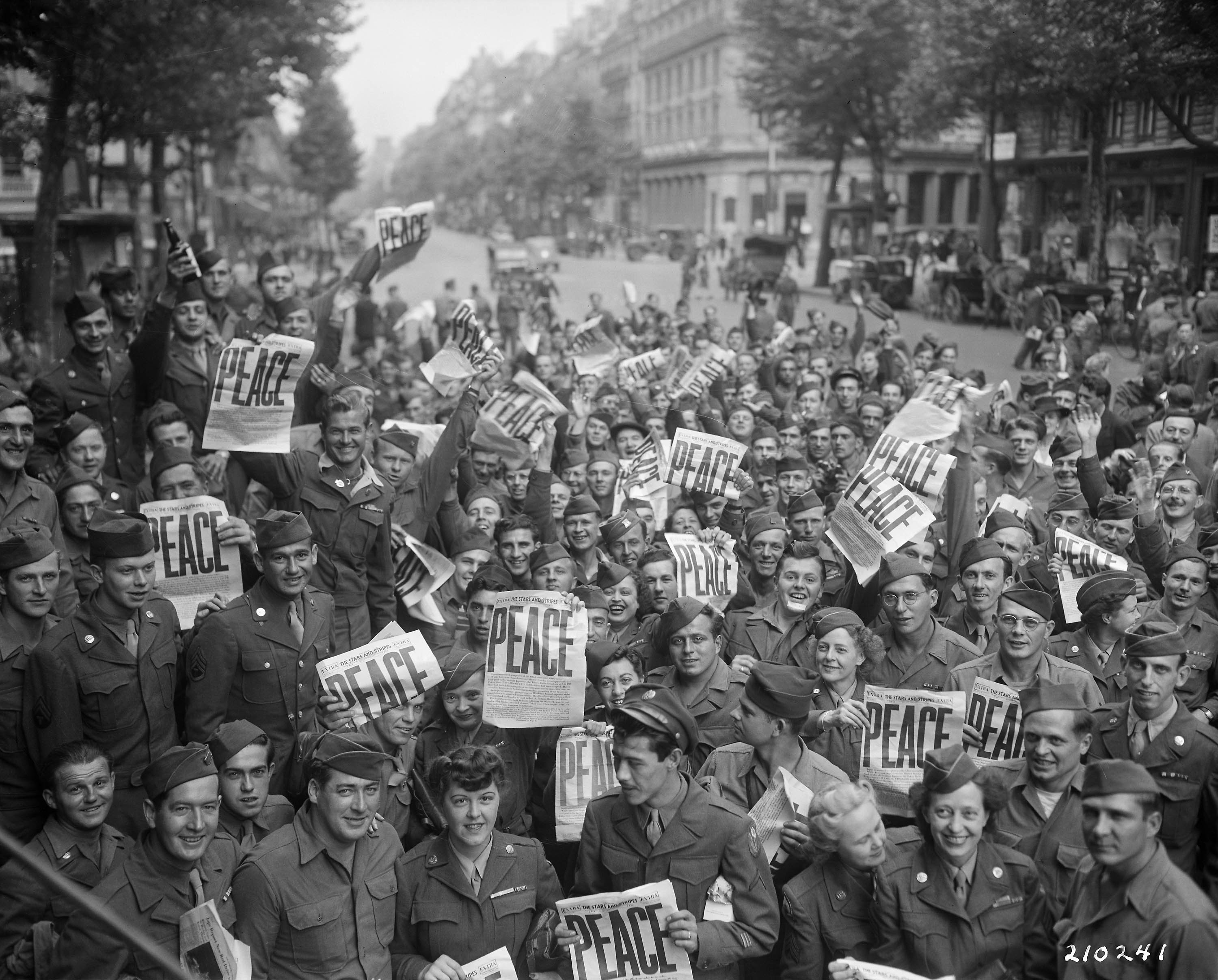
Allied military personnel in Paris celebrating V-J Day on August 15, 1945

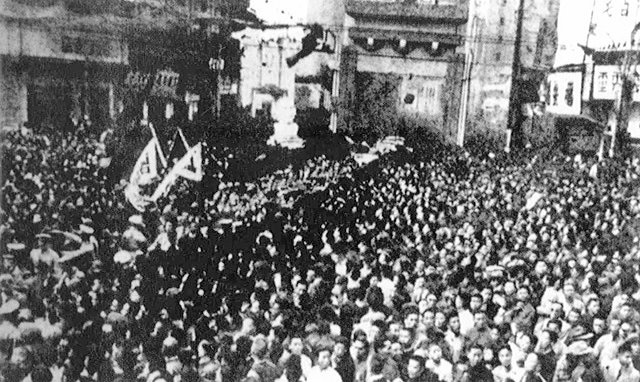
Crowds in Shanghai celebrating V-J Day on August 15, 1945

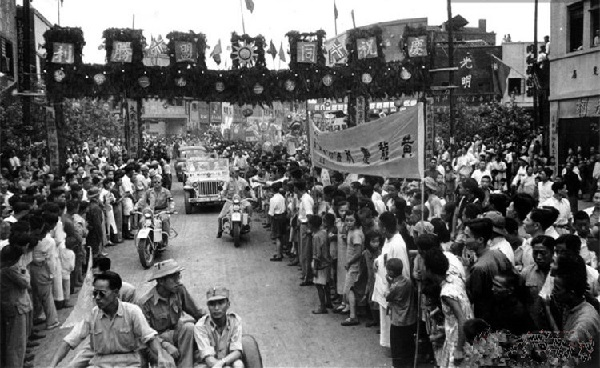
Chinese victory parade in Chongqing on September 3, 1945

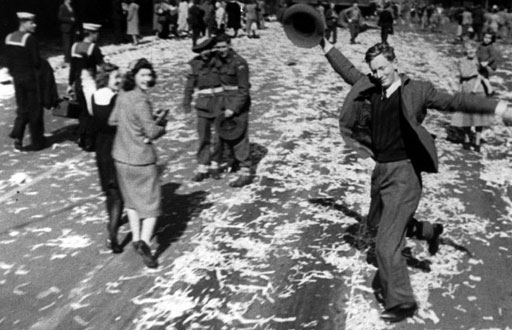
Dancing Man in Sydney on August 15, 1945

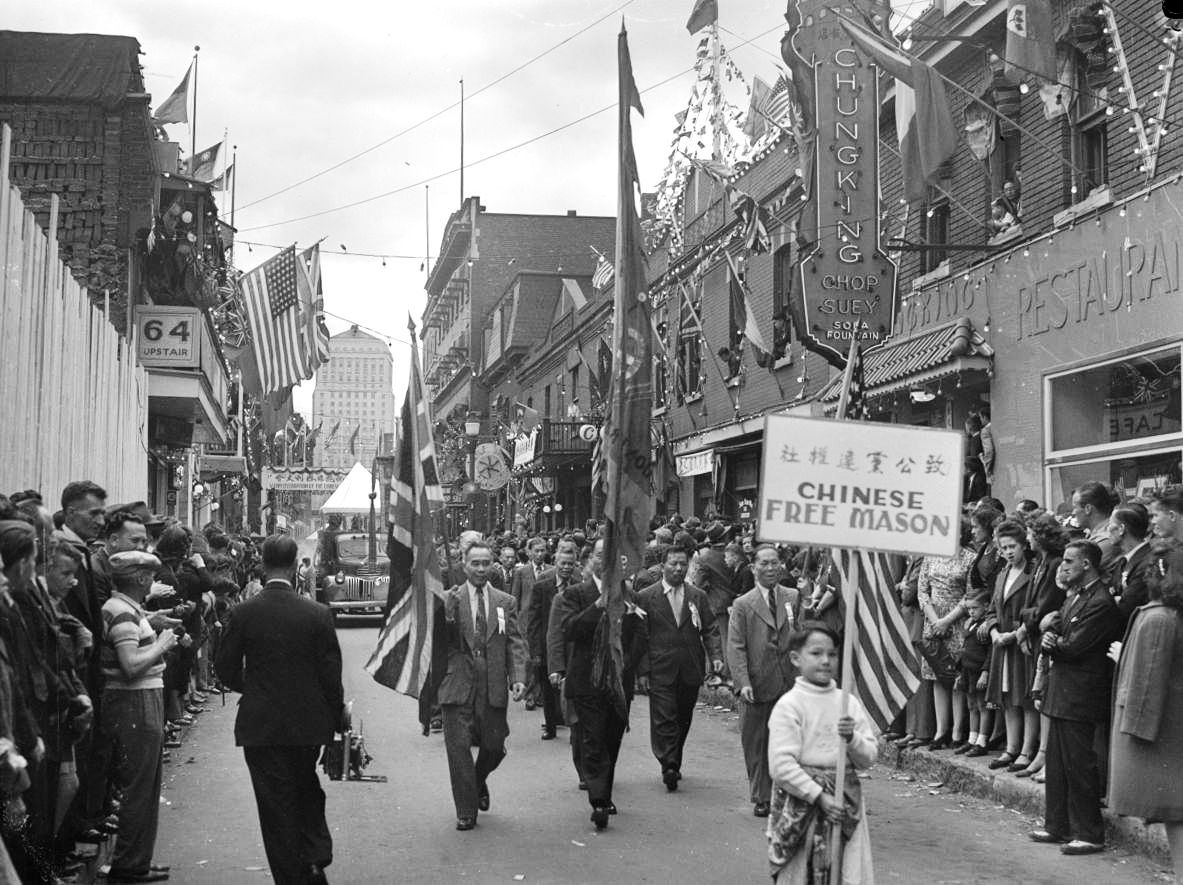
Montreal's Chinese community celebrates V-J Day with a parade in Chinatown on September 2, 1945

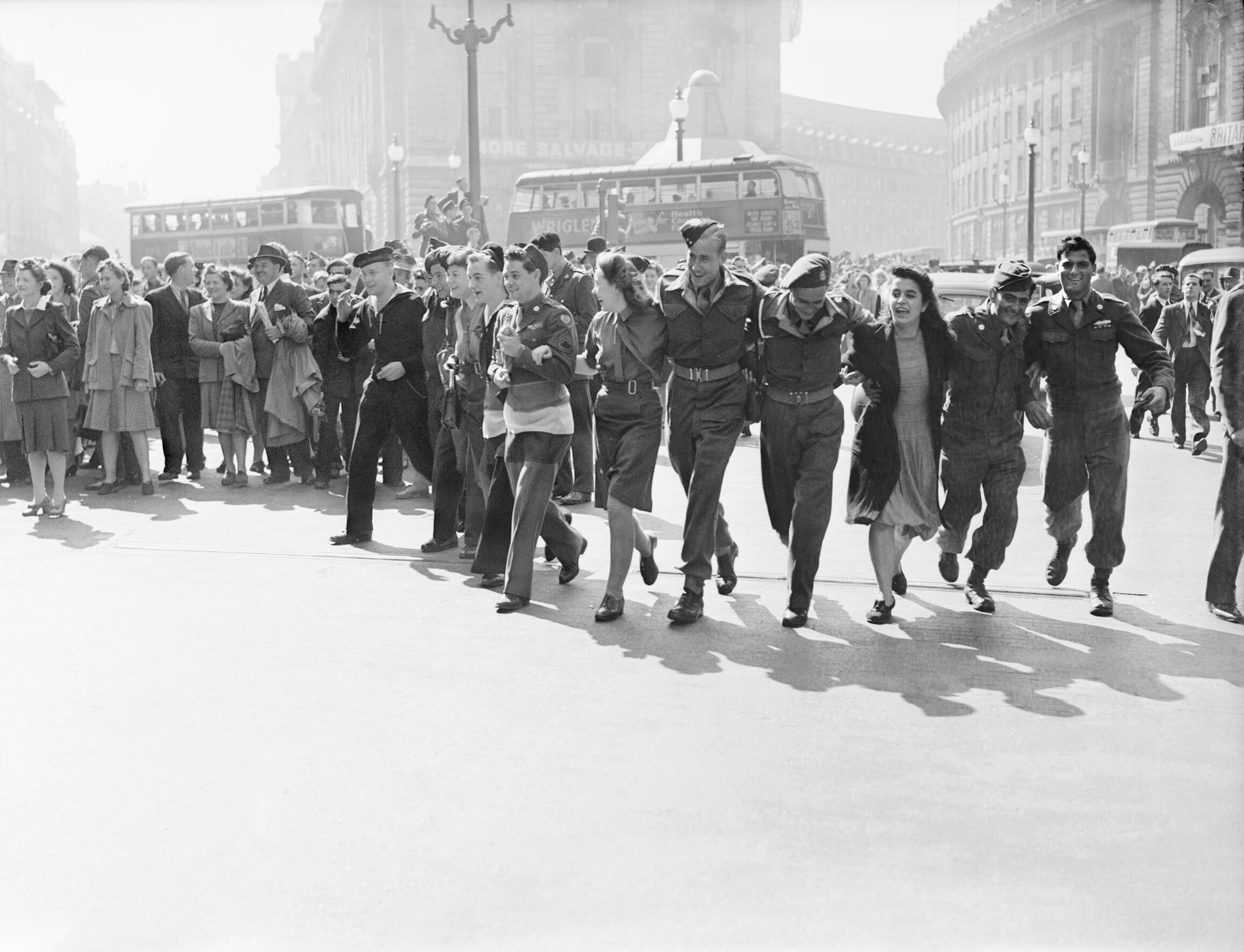
Civilians and service personnel in London celebrating V-J Day on August 15, 1945

==== Famous photographs ====
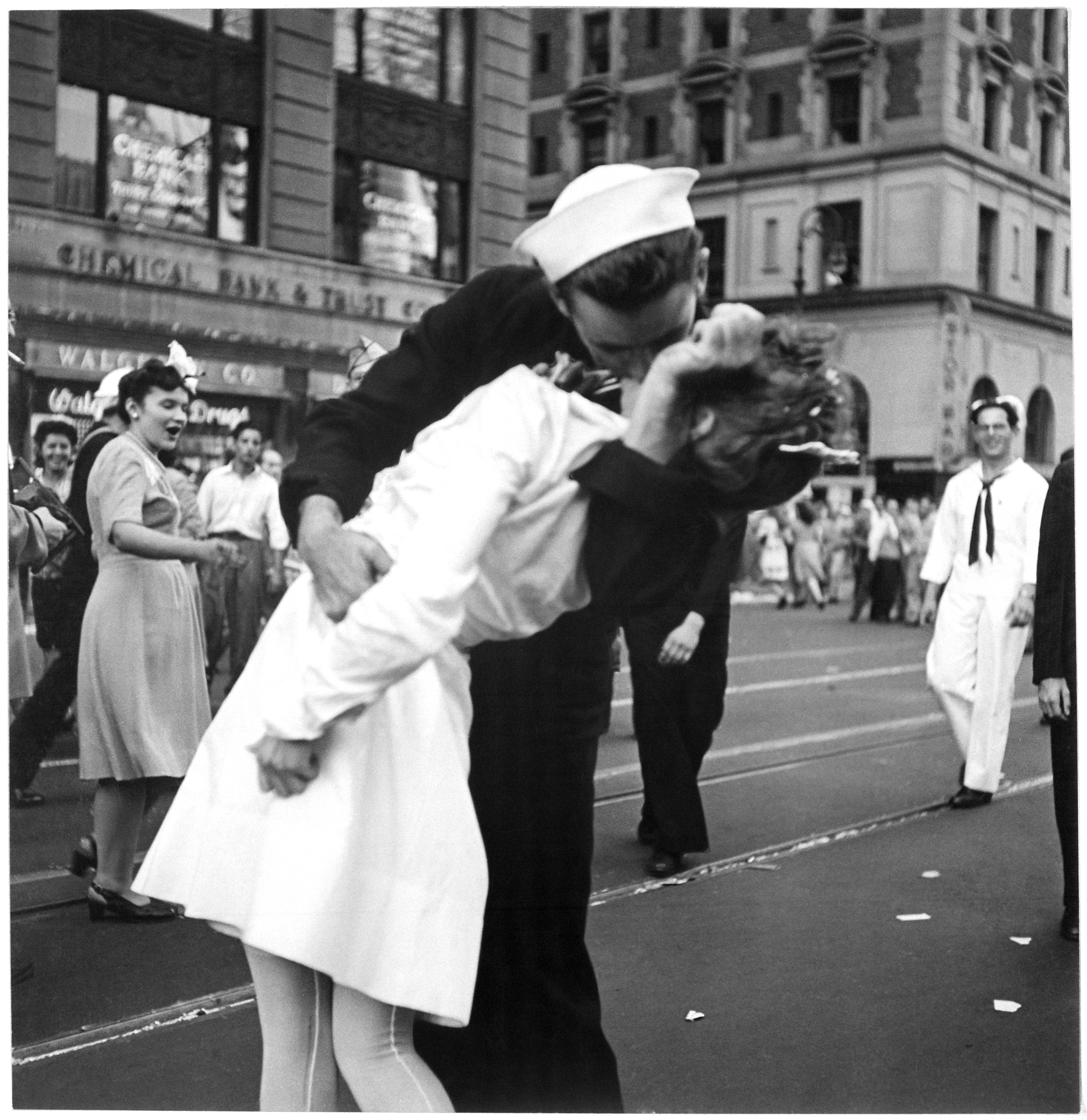
Victor Jorgensen's photo published in The New York Times

One of the best-known kisses that day appeared in V-J Day in Times Square, one of the most famous photographs ever published by Life. It was shot on August 14, 1945, shortly before the announcement by President Truman occurred and when people were beginning to gather in celebration. Alfred Eisenstaedt went to Times Square to take candid photographs and spotted a sailor who "grabbed something in white. And I stood there, and they kissed. And I snapped four times." The same moment was captured in a very similar photograph by Navy photographer Victor Jorgensen (right), published in the New York Times. Several people have since claimed to be the sailor or the female, who was long assumed to be a nurse. It has since been established that the woman in the Alfred Eisenstaedt photograph was actually a dental assistant named Greta Zimmer Friedman, who clarified in a later interview that "I was grabbed by a sailor and it wasn't that much of a kiss, it was more of a jubilant act that he didn't have to go back, I found out later, he was so happy that he did not have to go back to the Pacific where they already had been through the war. And the reason he grabbed someone dressed like a nurse was that he just felt very grateful to nurses who took care of the wounded."

Another famous image is that of the Dancing Man in Elizabeth Street, Sydney, captured by a press photographer and a Movietone newsreel. The film and stills from it have taken on iconic status in Australian history and culture as a symbol of victory in the war.

=== Japanese reaction ===
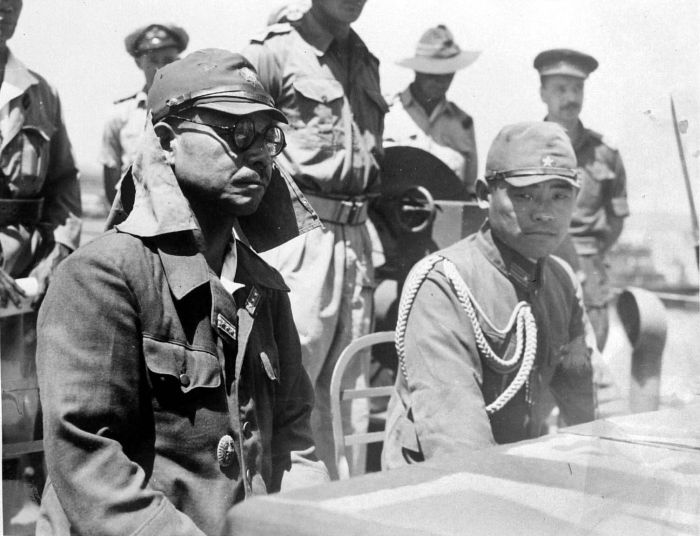
Japanese commanders listen to the terms of surrender aboard an Australian warship.

On August 15 and 16, some Japanese soldiers, devastated by the surrender, committed suicide. Well over 100 American prisoners of war were also murdered. In addition, many Australian and British prisoners of war were murdered in Borneo, at both Ranau and Sandakan, by the Imperial Japanese Army. At Batu Lintang camp, also in Borneo, death orders were found which proposed the murder of some 2,000 POWs and civilian internees on September 15, 1945, but the camp was liberated four days before these orders were due to be carried out. Japanese forces remained in combat with Soviet forces on several fronts for two weeks following V-J Day.

=== Ceremony aboard USS Missouri ===
The formal signing of the Japanese Instrument of Surrender took place on board the battleship USS Missouri in Tokyo Bay on September 2, 1945, and at that time Truman declared September 2 to be the official V-J Day.

== Chronology ==
- April 1 – June 21, 1945: Battle of Okinawa. 82,000+ US military casualties, and 117,000+ Japanese and Okinawan. Approximately one quarter of the Okinawan civilian population died, often in mass suicides organized by the Imperial Japanese Army.
- July 26: The Potsdam Declaration is issued. Truman tells Japan to surrender or suffer "prompt and utter destruction."
- July 29: Japan rejects the Potsdam Declaration.
- August 2: The Potsdam Conference ends.
- August 6: The US drops an atomic bomb, Little Boy, on Hiroshima. In a press release 16 hours later, Truman warns Japan to surrender or "expect a rain of ruin from the air, the like of which has never been seen on this earth."
- August 9: The USSR declares war on Japan, and invades several Japanese-held territories. The US drops another atomic bomb, Fat Man, on Nagasaki.
- August 10: At the direction of the Emperor, the Japanese Foreign Ministry notifies the Allies (via Swiss diplomatic channels) of Japan's intention to surrender unconditionally in accordance with the terms of the Potsdam Declaration, providing the Emperor be permitted to remain in place.
- August 11: The Allies notify the Japanese government (again via Swiss diplomats) of their willingness to accept Japan's surrender as offered.
- August 14: Allied governments announce the surrender of Japan, and the Emperor informs his people of the fact in an unprecedented radio broadcast. The date is described as "V-J Day" or "V-P Day" in newspapers in the United States, United Kingdom, Australia, New Zealand, and Canada.

Allied forces Supreme Commander Douglas MacArthur's arrival in allied-occupied Japan and flag-raising ceremony post-VJ Day, September 1945.

- September 2: Official surrender ceremony is held aboard USS Missouri in Tokyo Bay; President Truman declares September 2 as the official "V-J Day".
- November 1: Scheduled commencement of Operation Olympic, the planned Allied invasion of Kyushu.
- March 1, 1946: Scheduled commencement of Operation Coronet, the planned Allied invasion of Honshu.
- September 8, 1951: 48 countries including Japan and most of the Allies sign the Treaty of San Francisco
- April 28, 1952: The Treaty of San Francisco goes into effect, formally ending the state of war between Japan and most of the Allied countries.

Post war:

- Some Japanese soldiers continued to fight on isolated Pacific islands until at least the 1970s, with the last known Japanese soldier surrendering in 1974.

== Commemoration ==
=== Australia ===
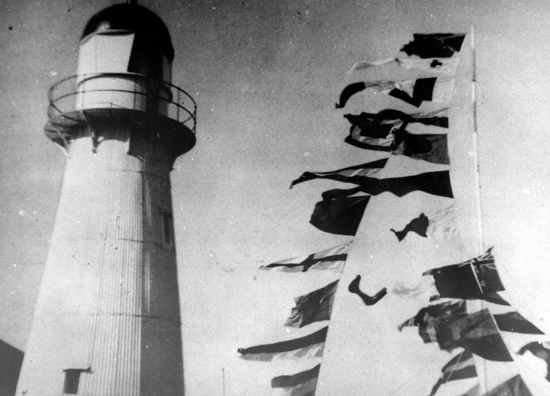
Victory celebrations at Caloundra, Queensland 1945

On 15 August 1945 Australian Prime Minister Ben Chifley announced on radio that Japan had unconditionally surrendered to allied forces. This day, which has become known as VP Day, was marked with jubilant celebrations across the nation as citizens looked towards a future free of conflict and fear of invasion. To manage celebrations authorities closed pubs, as they had on VE Day. However, this did not dissuade individuals from partying, with crowds gathering in streets and strangers dancing together in city squares.

In Australia, many use the term "VP Day" in preference to "VJ Day", but in the publication The Sixth Year of War in Pictures published by The Sun News-Pictorial in 1946, the term "VJ Day" is used on pages 250 and 251. Also an Australian Government 50th Anniversary Medal issued in 1995 has "VJ-Day" stamped on it.

==== Amateur radio ====
Amateur radio operators in Australia hold the "Remembrance Day Contest" on the weekend nearest VP Day, August 15, remembering amateur radio operators who died during World War II and to encourage friendly participation and help improve the operating skills of participants. The contest runs for 24 hours, from 0800 UTC on the Saturday, preceded by a broadcast including a speech by a dignitary or notable Australian (such as the Prime Minister of Australia, Governor-General of Australia, or a military leader) and the reading of the names of amateur radio operators who are known to have died. It is organized by the Wireless Institute of Australia, with operators in each Australian state contacting operators in other states, New Zealand, and Papua New Guinea. A trophy is awarded to the state that can boast the greatest rate of participation, based on a formula including: number of operators, number of contacts made, and radio frequency bands used.

=== China ===
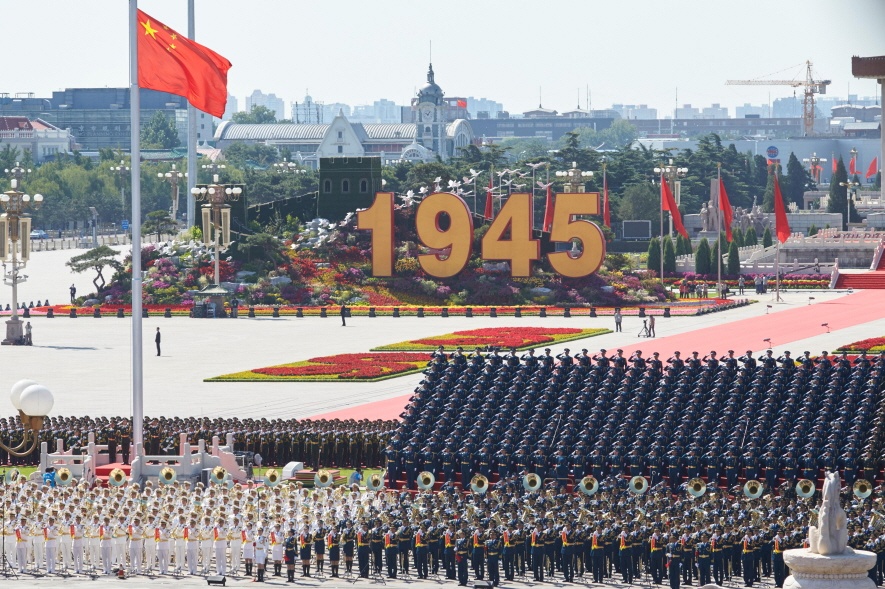
70th-anniversary Victory Day Parade on Tiananmen Square

As the final official surrender of Japan was accepted aboard the battleship USS Missouri in Tokyo Bay on September 2, 1945, the Nationalist Government of the Republic of China announced three-day holidays to celebrate V-J Day, starting September 3. Starting from 1946, September 3 was celebrated as "Victory of War of Resistance against Japan Day" (Chinese: 抗日戰爭勝利紀念日; pinyin: Kàngrì Zhànzhēng Shènglì Jìniànrì), which evolved into the People's Liberation Army Day (Chinese: 軍人節) in 1955. September 3 is recognized as V-J Day in the People's Republic of China.

=== Hong Kong ===
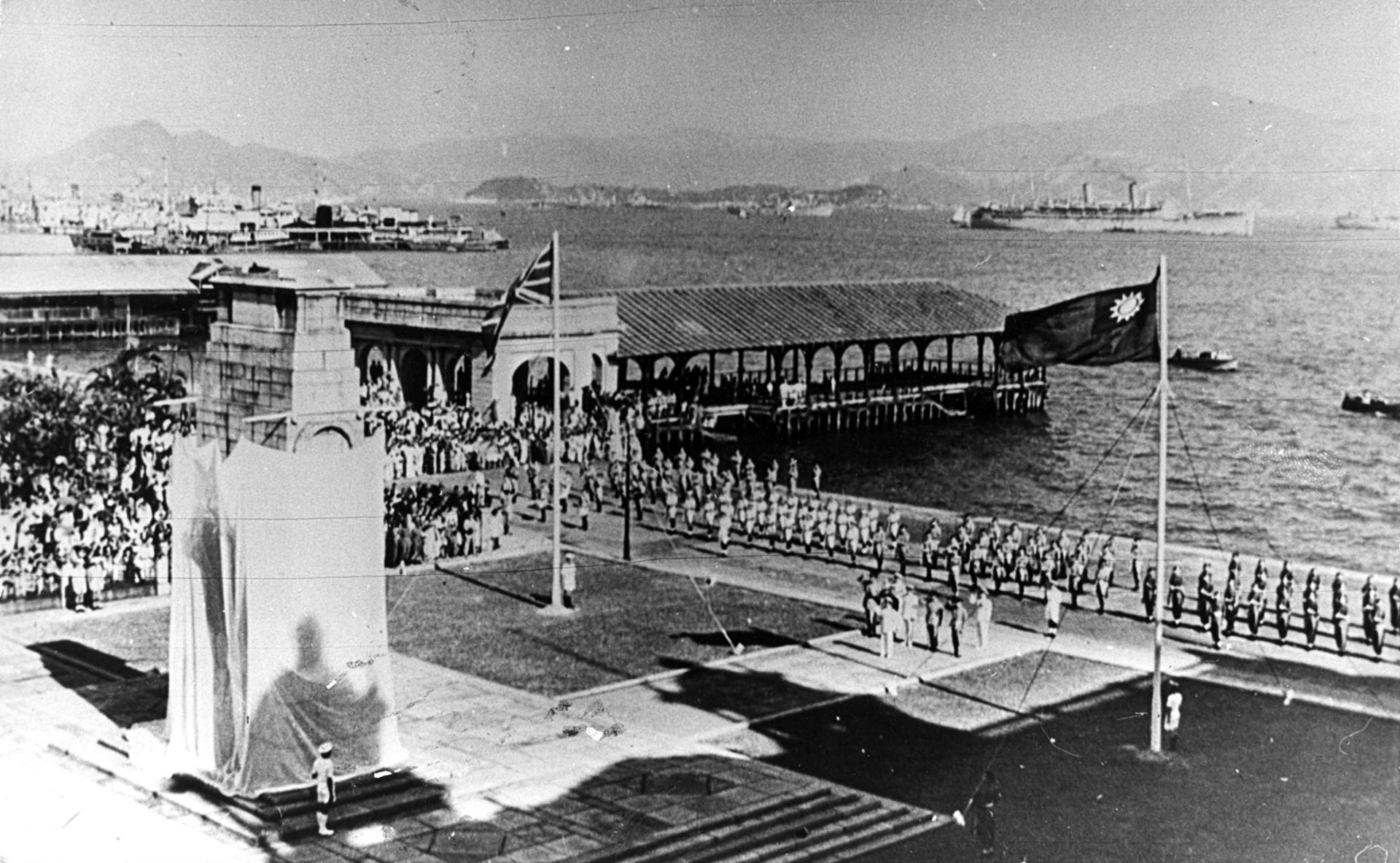
The Union Jack and the flag of the Republic of China were flown at the Cenotaph in Hong Kong upon liberation in 1945..

Hong Kong was handed over by the Imperial Japanese Army to the Royal Navy on August 30, 1945, and resumed its pre-war status as a British Crown colony. Hong Kong celebrated the "Liberation Day" (Chinese: 重光紀念日; Jyutping: cung4 gwong1 gei2 nim3 jat6) on August 30 (later moved to the Saturday preceding the last Monday in August) annually, which was a public holiday before 1997. After the transfer of sovereignty in 1997, the celebration was moved to the third Monday in August and renamed "Sino-Japanese War Victory Day", the Chinese name of which is literally "Victory of War of Resistance against Japan Day" as in the rest of China, but this day was removed from the list of public holidays in 1999. In 2014, the Chief Executive's Office announced that a commemoration ceremony would be held on September 3, in line with the "Victory Day of the Chinese people's war of resistance against Japanese aggression" in mainland China.

=== Korea ===
The day is celebrated as a public holiday in South Korea,. The day has particular significance to Korea, as it is the day that it was liberated from its status as a colony of the Empire of Japan. In Korea it is referred to as Gwangbokjeol, (lit. 'the day the light returned').

=== Mongolia ===
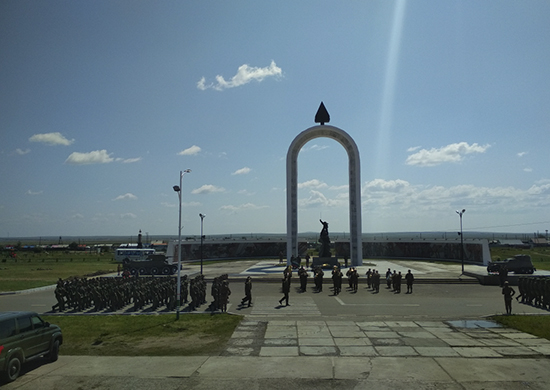
Troops of the Mongolian Armed Forces and the Russian Army during the 80th anniversary parade in Choibalsan

Victory over Japan Day is celebrated with duality in Mongolia. It also celebrates the victory of Soviet and Mongolian forces in the Battles of Khalkhin Gol. The anniversary of the battle was first celebrated in 1969, and was periodically celebrated on a massive scale every 5 years until its 50th anniversary in 1989, after which it dwindled in importance and was reduced to the level of academic debates and lectures. It was only recently that the anniversary made a resurgence in Mongolian history. It is jointly celebrated by the Mongolian Armed Forces with the Russian Armed Forces. During the 70th, 75th and 80th anniversaries in 2009, 2014 and 2019 respectively, the President of Russia has taken part in the celebrations alongside the President of Mongolia as part of the former's state visit to the Mongolian capital.

=== Netherlands ===
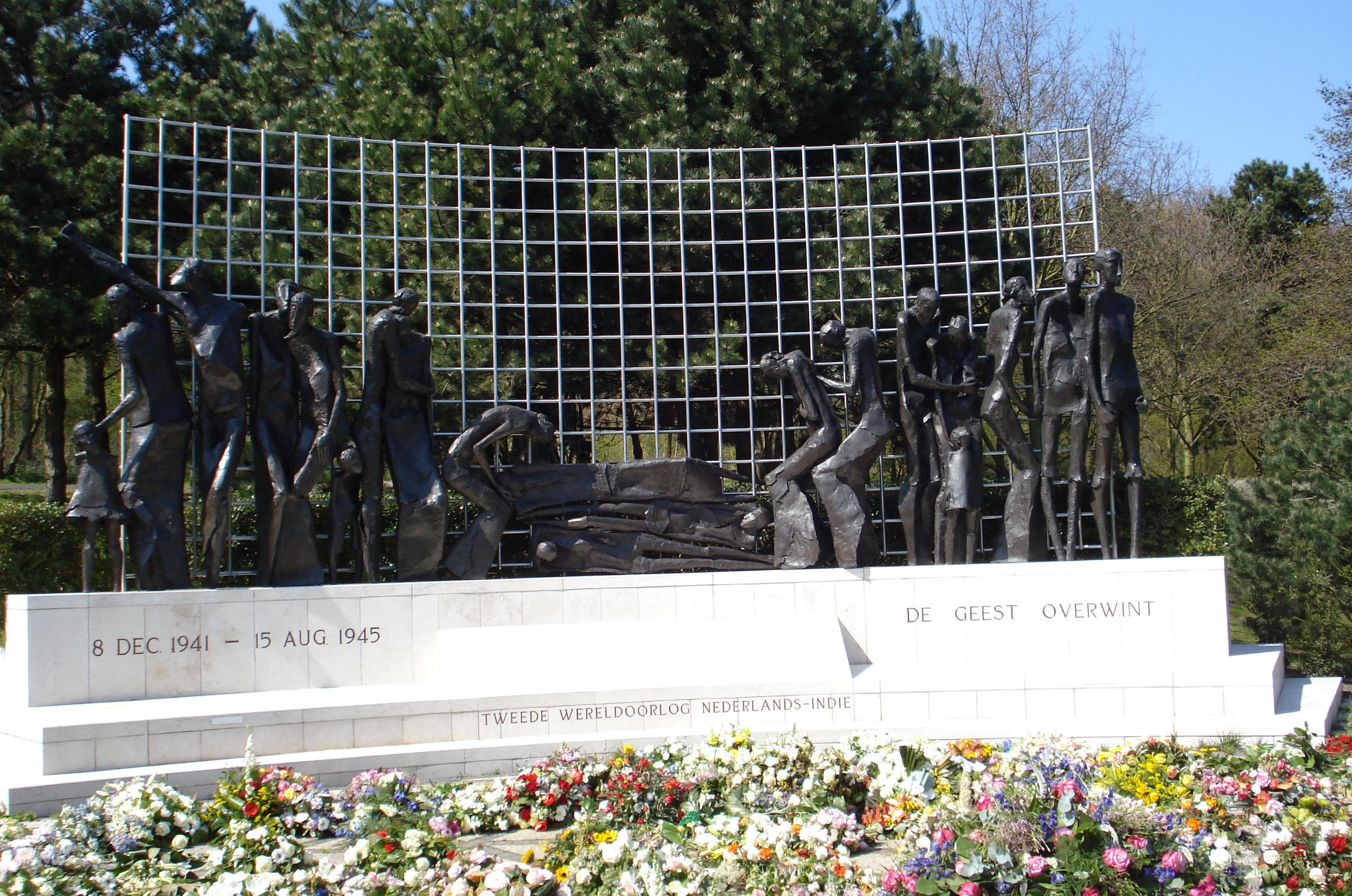
Indisch monument by Jaroslawa Dankowa, 1989. The Hague, Netherlands.

The Netherlands has one national and several regional or local remembrance services on or around August 15. The national service is at the "Indisch monument" (Dutch for "Indies Monument") in The Hague, where the victims of the Japanese occupation of the Dutch East Indies are remembered, usually in the presence of the head of state and the government. In total, there are about 20 services, also in the Indies remembrance center in Bronbeek in Arnhem. The Japanese occupation meant the twilight of Dutch colonial rule over Indonesia. Indonesia declared itself independent on August 17, 1945, just two days after the Japanese surrendered. The Indonesian War of Independence lasted until 1949, with the Netherlands recognizing Indonesian sovereignty in late December of that year.

=== Vietnam ===
On September 2, 1945, the same day as Japan's surrender, Ho Chi Minh declared the independence of the Democratic Republic of Vietnam.

=== Philippines ===
In the Philippines, V-J Day is celebrated annually on September 3 and is called the "Surrender of General Tomoyuki Yamashita Day". The province of Ifugao has observed every September 2 as "Victory Day", commemorating the valor of Philippine war veterans and the informal surrender of General Yamashita to the joint Filipino-American troops led-by Cpt. Grisham in the municipality of Kiangan on September 2, 1945.

=== Russia/Former USSR ===
It was introduced as a holiday by decree of the Presidium of the Supreme Soviet of the Soviet Union on September 3, 1945 (the day after the surrender of Japan). The only celebration that was held in the days that followed was a parade of the Red Army in Harbin. In 1945 and 1946, this day was a national holiday. In subsequent years, it became a working day and no celebrations were held on this occasion. In modern Russia, Victory over Japan Day (Russian: День победы над Японией) is considered a memorable date and is celebrated as one of many Days of Military Honour. In recent years such as in 2017, bills in the State Duma have proposed making it a national holiday. In 2023, Russia renamed the holiday from "Day of the End of World War II (1945)" to "Day of Victory over Militaristic Japan and the End of World War II (1945)", a move Japan called "extremely regrettable".

A military parade of the Eastern Military District is annually held in the cities of Yuzhno-Sakhalinsk or Khabarovsk, being one of the only parades being held on this day. Parades have also been held on September 2 in the federal subjects of Russia that celebrate the anniversary of the Battles of Khalkhin Gol, such as Buryatia, Yakutia and the Altai Republic. In the breakaway Moldovan-republic of Transnistria, Victory over Japan Day is jointly celebrated with their Republic Day celebrations, which take place on the same day.

=== United States ===
The event is not an official federal holiday. In March, 1948, Rhode Island officially established its state holiday commemorating the ending of WW2 as "Victory Day",, the observance of which was changed in the late 1960s to the second Monday of August.

Arkansas was another state to make the August 14th holiday official statewide, as “World War II Memorial Day”, but it was abolished by the General Assembly in 1975.

On August 14, 1945, Acting Governor Frederick F. Houser proclaimed August 15, 1945, "to be a legal holiday in the State of California, in official commemoration of the surrender of Japan and the close of the terrible world wide struggle in which we have had a part."

Some communities in the United States continue to commemorate V-J Day with annual celebrations and parades. Hillman, Michigan, has held an annual V-J Day community celebration since 1945, including a parade, while Moosup, Connecticut, has held an annual V-J Day parade since 1961.

== World Peace Day ==
It was suggested in the 1960s to declare September 2, the anniversary of the end of World War II, as an international holiday to be called World Peace Day. However, when this holiday came to be first celebrated beginning in 1981, it was designated as September 21, the day the General Assembly of the United Nations begins its deliberations each year.

== See also ==
- Surrender of Japan
- Japanese holdouts
- Retrocession Day, in Taiwan (ROC)
- Zero hour (1945)
- Robert Trout, first American newsman to announce the Japanese surrender
- Victory in Europe Day
- Monument to the Victory over Japan
