= Indies Monument =

War memorial in The Hague, Netherlands

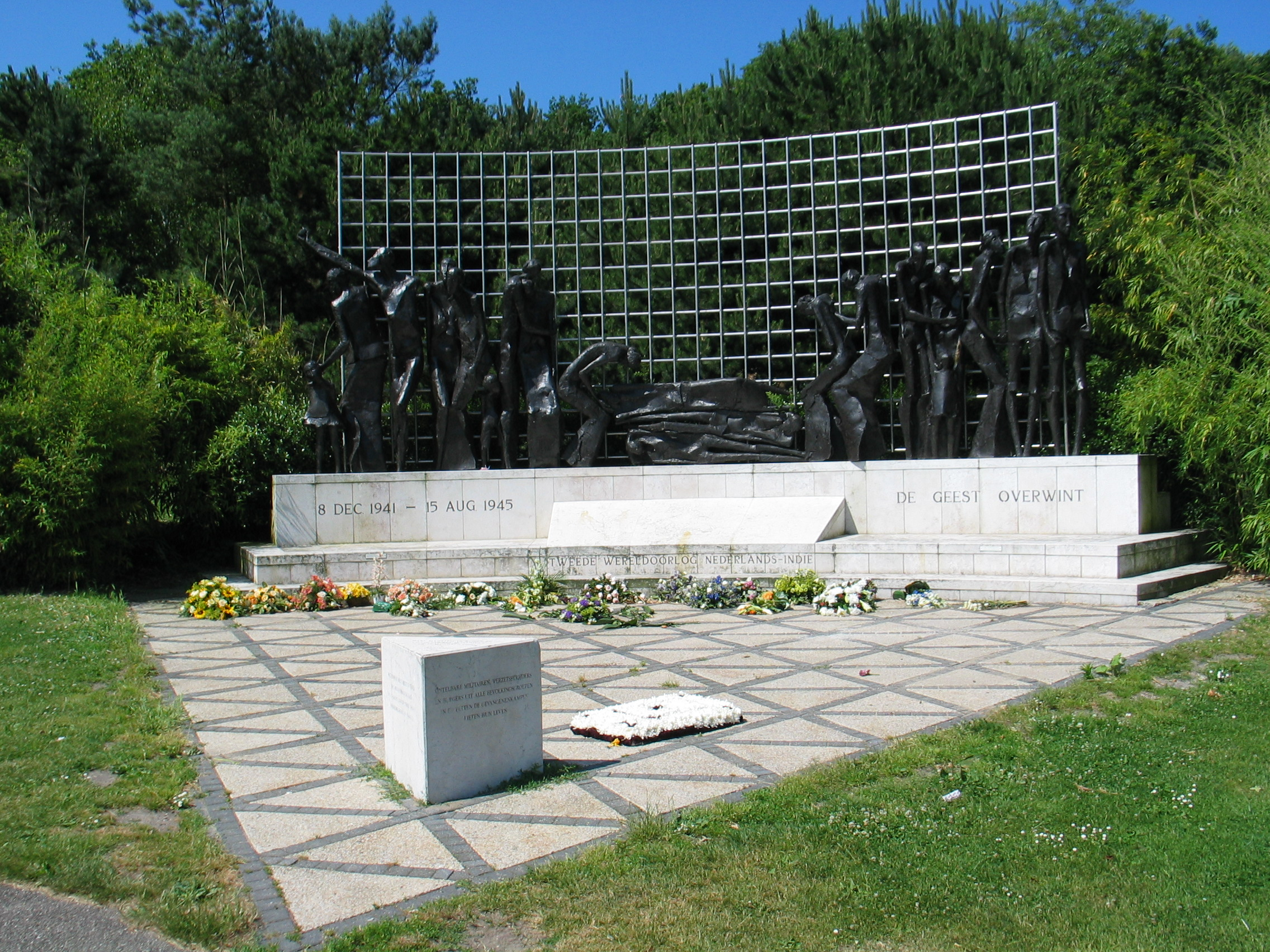
Indisch Monument, The Hague

The Indies Monument (Dutch: Indisch Monument) is a memorial in The Hague in memory of all Dutch citizens and soldiers killed during World War II as a result of the Japanese occupation (1942–1945) of the former Dutch East Indies. It is dedicated to all who died in battle, in prison camps or during forced labor. As stated in the mission statement of the 15 August 1945 Commemoration Foundation, it is also:

A place where you can pass on to your children the part of your childhood spent in the Dutch East Indies

The monument is unique, due to the fact that earth from the seven war cemeteries in Indonesia has been placed in an urn mounted on a small column at the front of the monument. In fall 2008 a second urn, with earth from the Galala Tantui war cemetery on Ambon Island, was placed behind the column.

Before the annual National Remembrance 15 August 1945, the Dutch ambassador to Indonesia lays a wreath at the Menteng Pulo War Cemetery on Java in cooperation with the Foundation. Once every five years (in 2010 and 2015), in coordination with the Dutch embassies and the Dutch War Graves Foundation, wreaths are also laid at all other war cemeteries in Indonesia, Australia and Southeast Asia where Dutch victims of war are buried. In addition to this monument a commemoration site in Bronbeek, Arnhem was established in 2010.

== Design ==
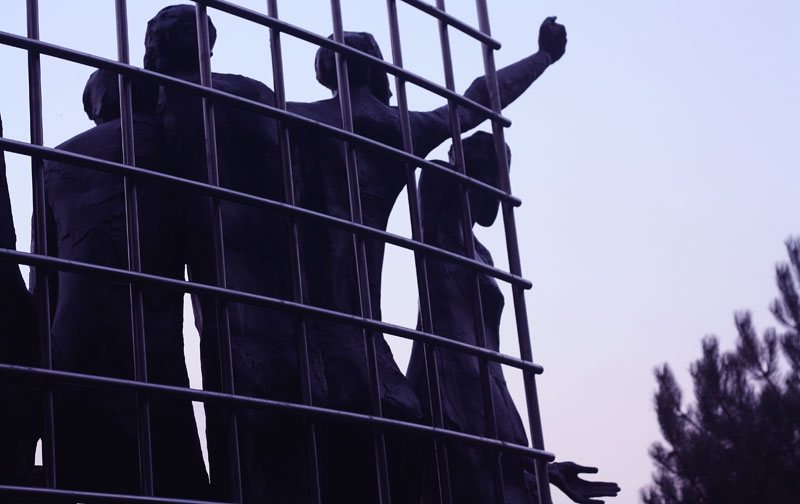
"The Spirit Overcomes"

Designed by Jaroslawa Dankowa, the monument was unveiled on August 15, 1988 by Queen Beatrix. It consists of 17 bronze sculptures, a map of Southeast Asia and the inscription, "The spirit conquers". Its design was chosen in 1986 by the Mayor of Amsterdam (a former government official in the Dutch East Indies) and the Deputy Mayor of Amsterdam (a former resistance fighter). The commission for the design stated:

Recognition through a representation of the struggle and the conquest. The humiliation, the repression, hardship, pain and despair. But also the hope, perseverance, courage and solidarity. Acknowledgement through a portrayal of our understanding today of the causes, the circumstances and consequences of that suffering.

== Development ==
It took the Netherlands 43 years to erect a national monument to its war victims in the Dutch East Indies. Until 1961, the National Remembrance of the Dead Day (May 4) and Liberation Day (May 5) were primarily dedicated to the Dutch victims of Nazi Germany. Since 1962, they include soldiers and civilians who fell during the Indonesian National Revolution.

Memorial Day at the Indies Monument is August 15, the date of the Japanese surrender. Unlike May 5 (the date of the German capitulation), it is not a public holiday in the Netherlands.

In the years following the transfer of sovereignty of the Dutch East Indies to Indonesia (1949) the political climate in the Netherlands was marked by sensitivity in relation to Indonesia and a sense of shame about the Netherlands' colonial past. As a result it took a long time before there was any interest in the war victims of the former Dutch East Indies colony.

== Kaifu incident ==
Three years after the monument was unveiled, Japanese Prime Minister Toshiki Kaifu laid a decorative garland at the monument on July 19, 1991 during his state visit. Later that day, the wreath was thrown into the water by a Dutch Indo demonstrator. Prime Minister Ruud Lubbers expressed his regret about the incident to Kaifu, which led to further angry reactions from Indo survivors of the Japanese occupation.

== Anniversary ==
To mark the 60th anniversary of the Japanese surrender on July 27, 2005 a smaller version of the monument was unveiled in Madurodam, a miniature park created in memory of the Antillian World War II hero George Maduro.

== Images ==
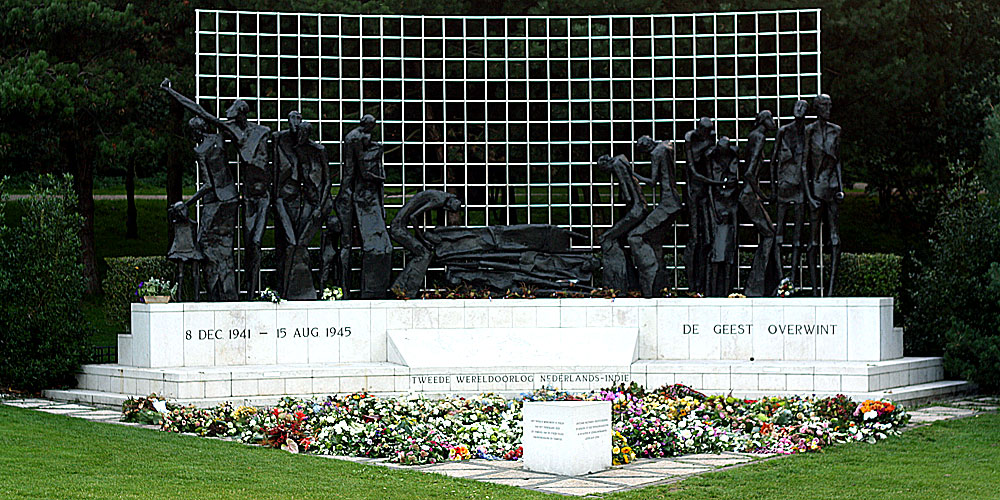
Indies Monument, August 2011

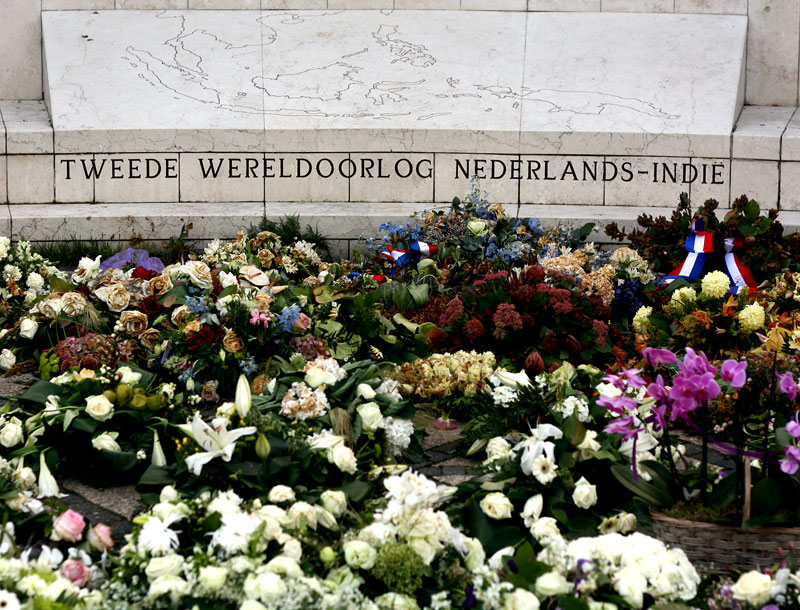
Indies Monument map of the Dutch East Indies (now Indonesia), August 2011

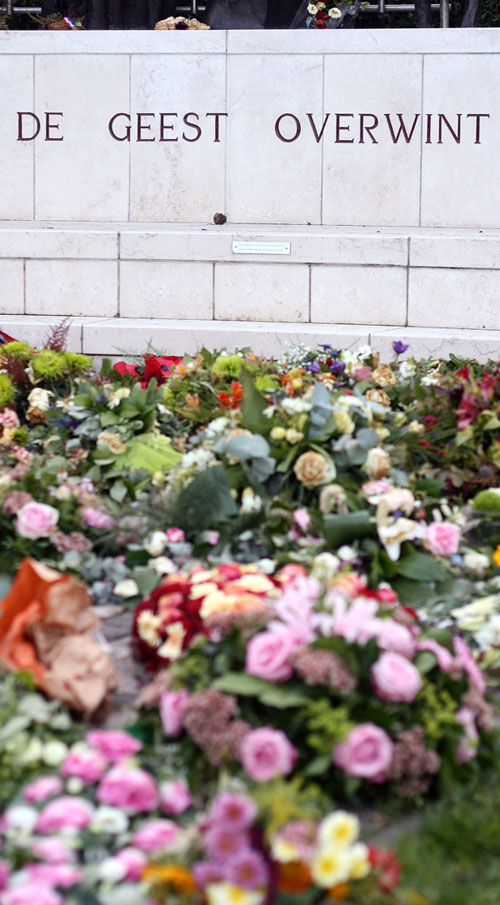
Indies Monument inscription "De Geest Overwint" ("The Spirit Overcomes"), August 2011

== See also ==
- World War II memorials and cemeteries in the Netherlands
