= National Committee for 4 and 5 May =

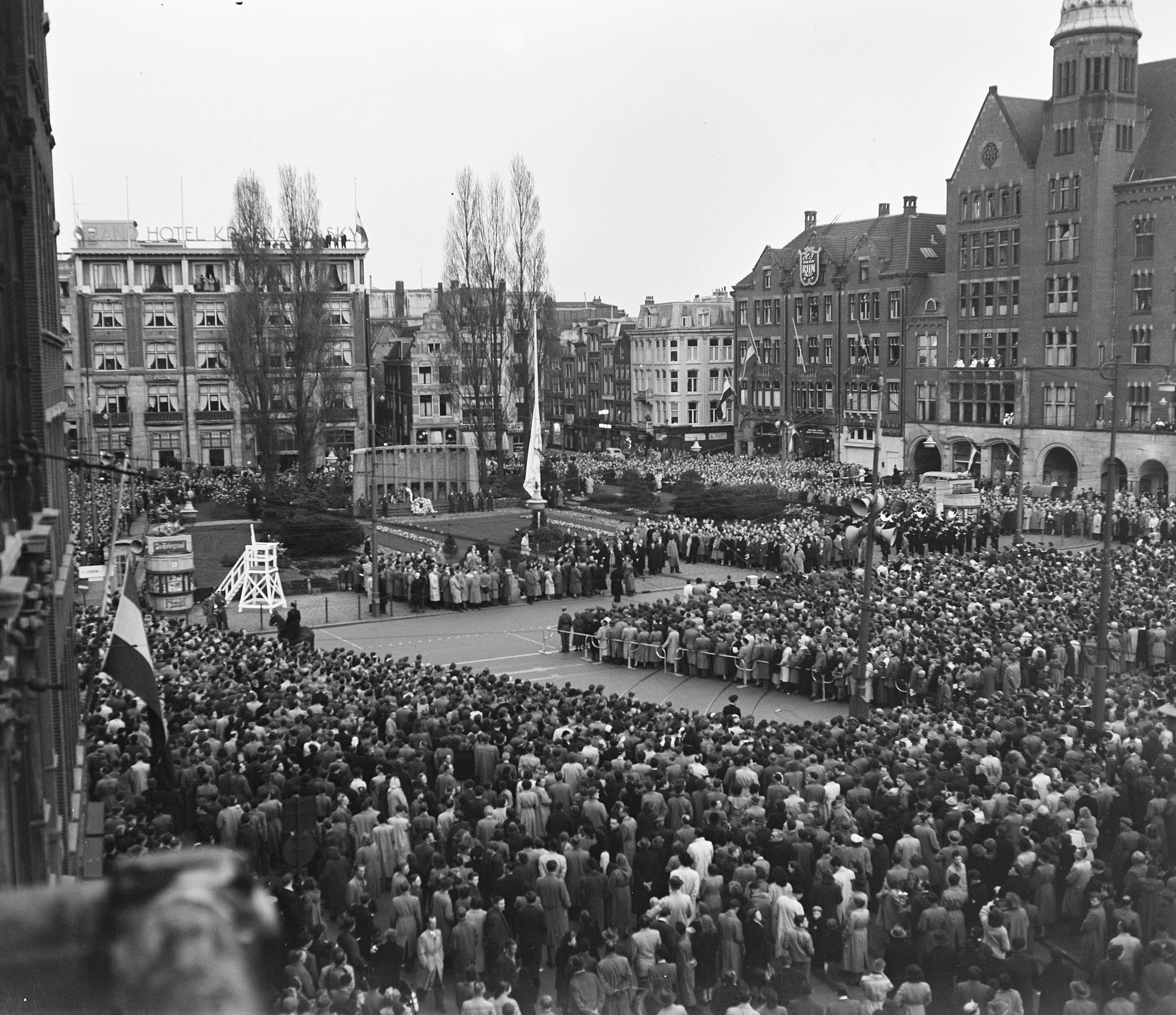
National Remembrance of the Dead 1954 - photo of the Dam from the northwest corner in Amsterdam just before the two minutes of national silence at 20:00

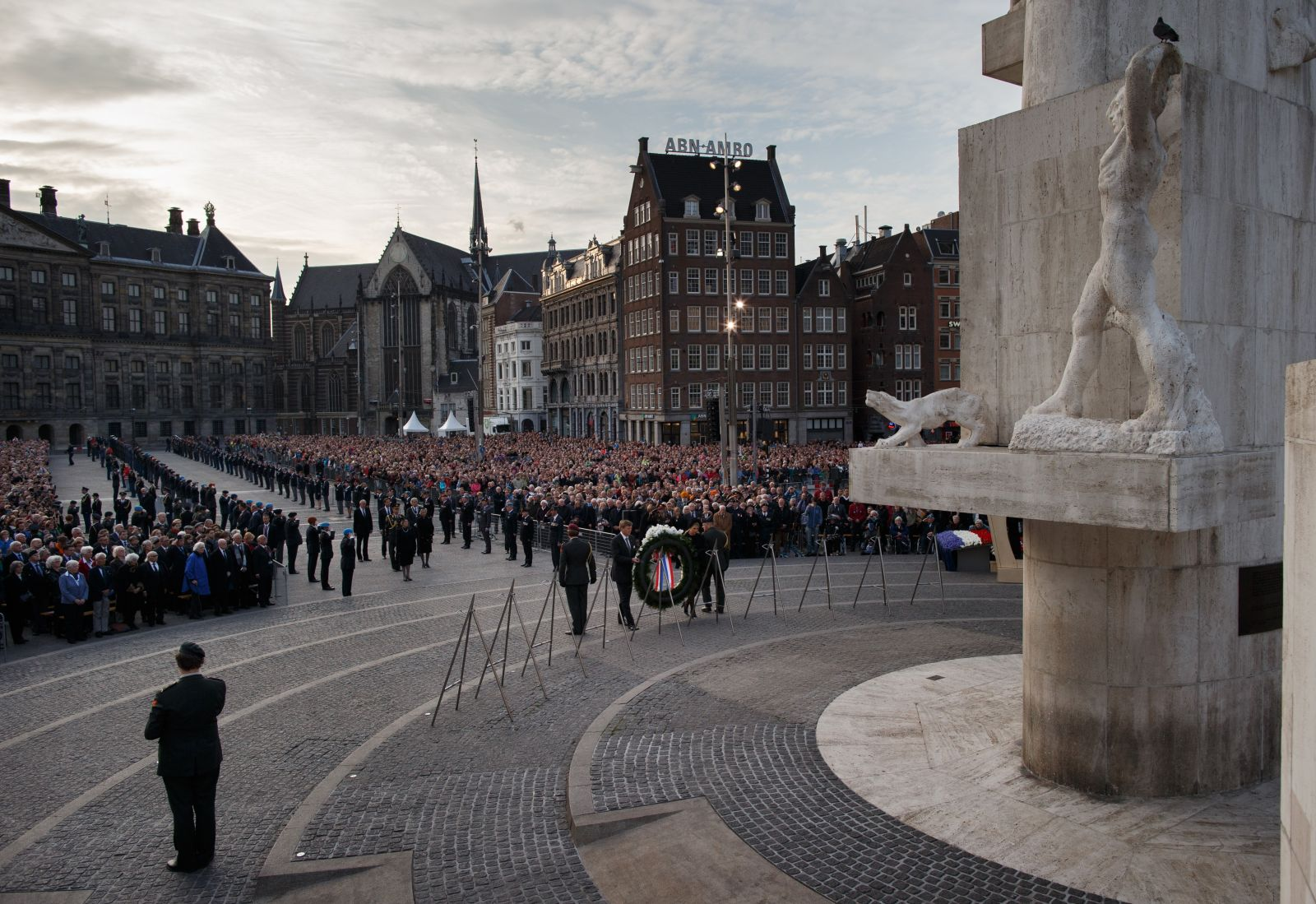
National Remembrance of the Dead 2014 - photo of the Dam from the southeast corner in Amsterdam just before the two minutes of national silence at 20:00

The National Committee for 4 and 5 May (Dutch: Nationaal Comité 4 en 5 mei) is a Dutch authority for war monuments and memorials since 1987.

The committee is best known for its annual organization of the Remembrance of the Dead observances on May 4, and also its organization of music festivals to celebrate freedom on May 5, Liberation Day (Dutch: "Bevrijdingsdag"). Prior to its founding, the various observances were all organized locally with little or no central coordination. The organization now keeps a database of all war memorials and monuments erected over time throughout the kingdom, and this includes objects in former state-controlled territories. Since starting the May 4th Amsterdam dodenherdenking, located on the spot where civilians were killed during the May 7th 1945 Dam Square shooting, efforts to widen the focus to be more inclusive of all war casualties have continued. The committee was founded in 1987 to preserve the various recorded events and also to uncover lesser known stories of national importance. To this day memorials are still created to honor WWII events, but also of national engagements since that time.

== Dutch War Memorial Database ==
The database of war memorials (Dutch: "oorlogsmonument") is an ongoing effort to capture metadata about actual monuments and memorials. The best known monument is the National Monument, erected in 1956 on the Dam.

== See also ==
- National Remembrance 15 August 1945
