= Waterloo Day =

Annual celebration held on 18 June

- Observed by: regiments of the British Army
- Date: 18 June
- Next time: 18 June 2026
- Frequency: annual

Waterloo Day is 18 June, the date of the Battle of Waterloo, in 1815. It is remembered and celebrated each year by certain regiments of the British Army, in the same way that the Royal Navy celebrates Trafalgar Day (21 October).

In the past, Waterloo Day was also commemorated by the Dutch in a celebratory manner. It began after a decree from King Willem I issued on 8 June 1816. The day continued to be an important national civilian celebration in the Netherlands until the German invasion of the Netherlands in 1940 and it is now replaced by Liberation Day.
