= Liberation Day (Netherlands) =

Annual holiday marking end of German occupation in Netherlands

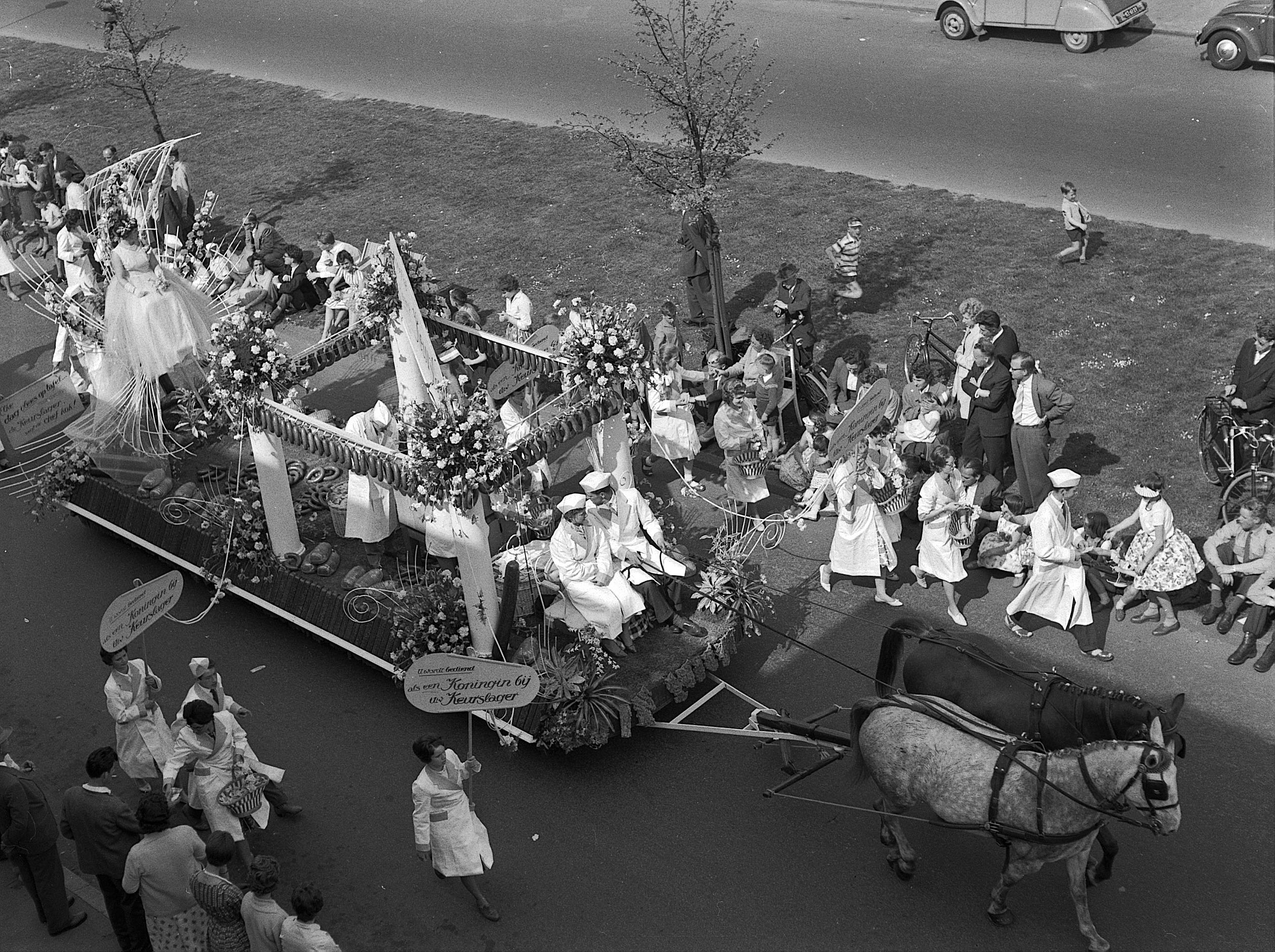
- Liberation Day parade in 1960 in Utrecht
- Official name: Bevrijdingsdag
- Observed by: Netherlands
- Type: National Day
- Celebrations: Music festivals
- Date: 5 May
- Frequency: Annual
- Related to: Liberation of the Netherlands from German occupation during World War II

Liberation Day (Dutch: Bevrijdingsdag [bəˈvrɛidɪŋzˌdɑx]) is a national holiday in the Netherlands celebrated annually on May 5 to mark the end of the German occupation of the country during the Second World War. It follows one day after the Remembrance of the Dead (Dodenherdenking) on 4 May. The end of the war is instead marked by National Remembrance on 15 August.

After liberation in 1945, Liberation Day was celebrated every five years. In 1990 the day was declared a national holiday when liberation would be remembered and celebrated every year. Liberation Day replaced Waterloo Day. Festivals are held in most places in the Netherlands with parades of veterans and musical festivals throughout the whole country on Liberation Day.

== Background ==
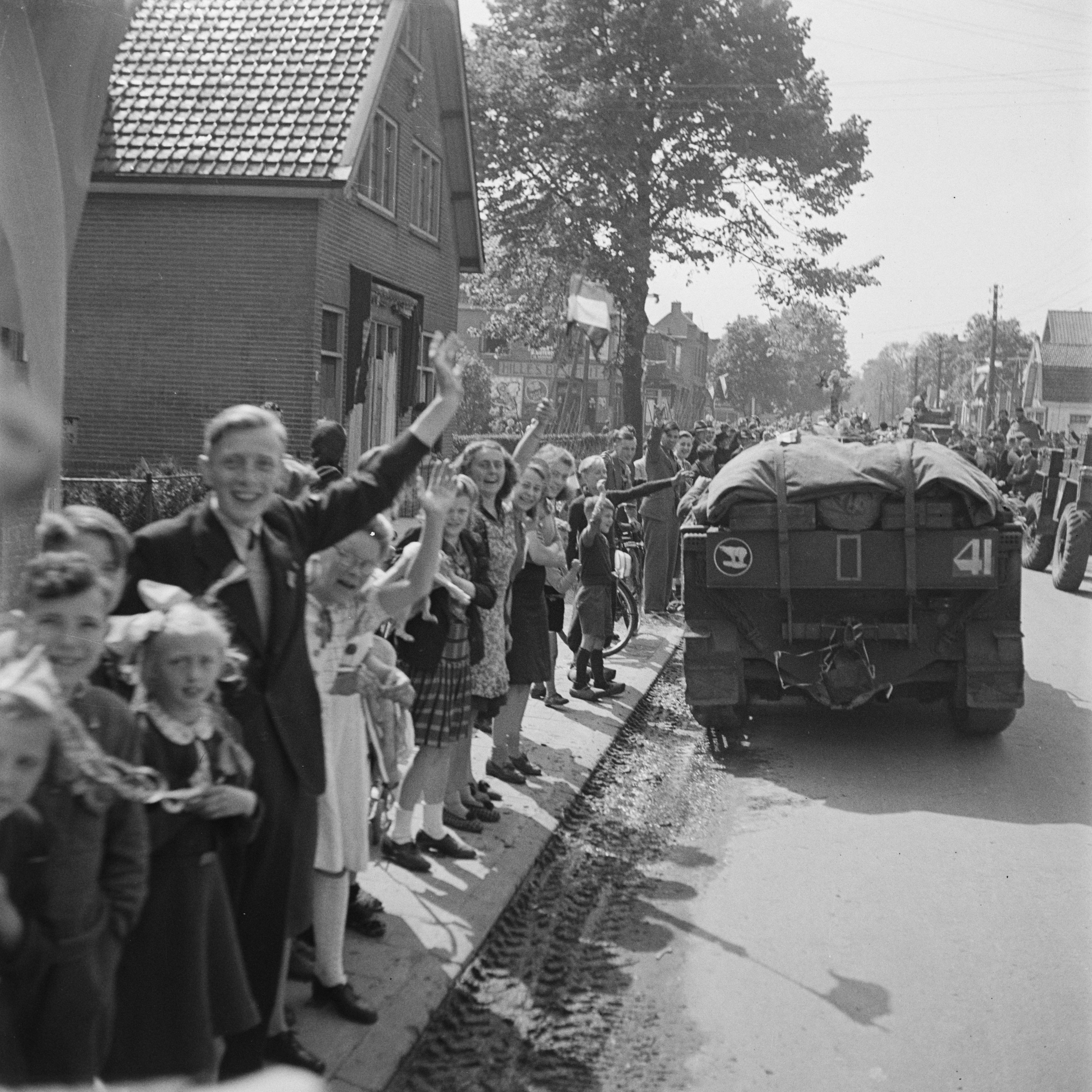
Liberating forces entering a place in Utrecht Province

The Netherlands was occupied by Germany and ruled under a civilian regime (Reichskommissariat Niederlande) beginning in 1940 during World War II. On 4 May 1945, German Admiral von Friedeburg surrendered in Lüneburg on behalf of the German troops in northwest Germany, the Netherlands, Schleswig-Holstein, and Denmark to British Field Marshal Montgomery. The Netherlands was liberated by American, Canadian forces, British infantry divisions, the British I Corps, the 1st Polish Armoured Division, Belgian, Dutch and Czechoslovak troops. Parts of the country, in particular the south-east, were liberated by the British Second Army which included American and Polish airborne forces (see Operation Market Garden) and French airbornes (see Operation Amherst). On 5 May 1945, at Hotel de Wereld in Wageningen, I Canadian Corps commander Lieutenant-General Charles Foulkes and Oberbefehlshaber Niederlande commander-in-chief Generaloberst Johannes Blaskowitz reached an agreement on the capitulation of all German forces in the Netherlands in the presence of Prince Bernhard, commander of the Dutch Interior Forces (Bernhard himself was German and a former Nazi Party member). The capitulation document was signed the next day in the auditorium of Wageningen University, located next door.

== National day ==
The liberation from the German and Japanese occupiers in 1945 was first celebrated on 31 August 1945, when it was still Queen's Day. Queen Wilhelmina did not want this celebration on her birthday, so May 5, the day of the surrender negotiations, came into play. In 1946, the government decided that Liberation Day should take place on May 5, unless it fell on a Sunday, because otherwise the tradition of Christian Sunday rest would be disrupted. In 1968, it was decided that Liberation Day would take place on May 5, regardless of the day of the week.

From 1958 onward, Liberation Day was celebrated only every five years. The various successive committees failed to establish a national tradition, unlike the National Remembrance Day. In 1990, May 5 was declared a national holiday, on which the liberation of the Netherlands from German occupation in 1945 is commemorated and celebrated annually. This does not automatically mean that May 5 is a day off. The Dutch government has determined that employees and employers in the private sector should make their own arrangements.

== Dutch East Indies ==
In the Dutch East Indies, there was no Liberation Day and remains so. Although the Dutch East Indies was liberated by the Japanese surrender on 15 August 1945, there was no reason for celebration for a free Indonesia because of the war of independence that started immediately. Instead, there is the National Remembrance, which only came into effect in 1999. Today the Kingdom of the Netherlands recognizes 15 August 1945 as the end of World War II and also the independence of Indonesia from the Netherlands.

== Celebrations ==
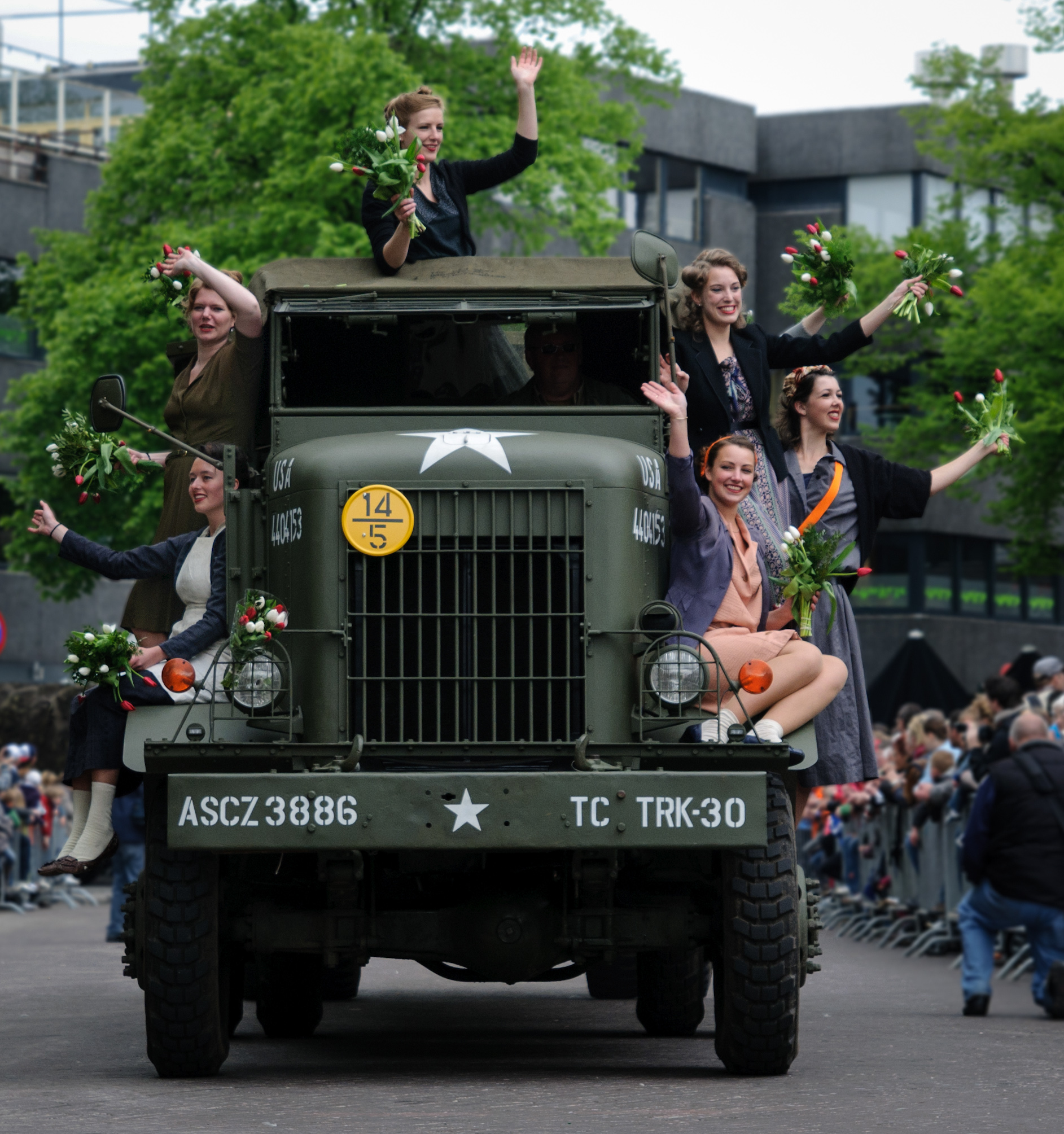
Liberation parade in Enschede

Activities are organized throughout the country; each city and town has its own program of activities, including many music festivals. The Liberation Day celebrations begin each year in a different province.

=== Fire ===
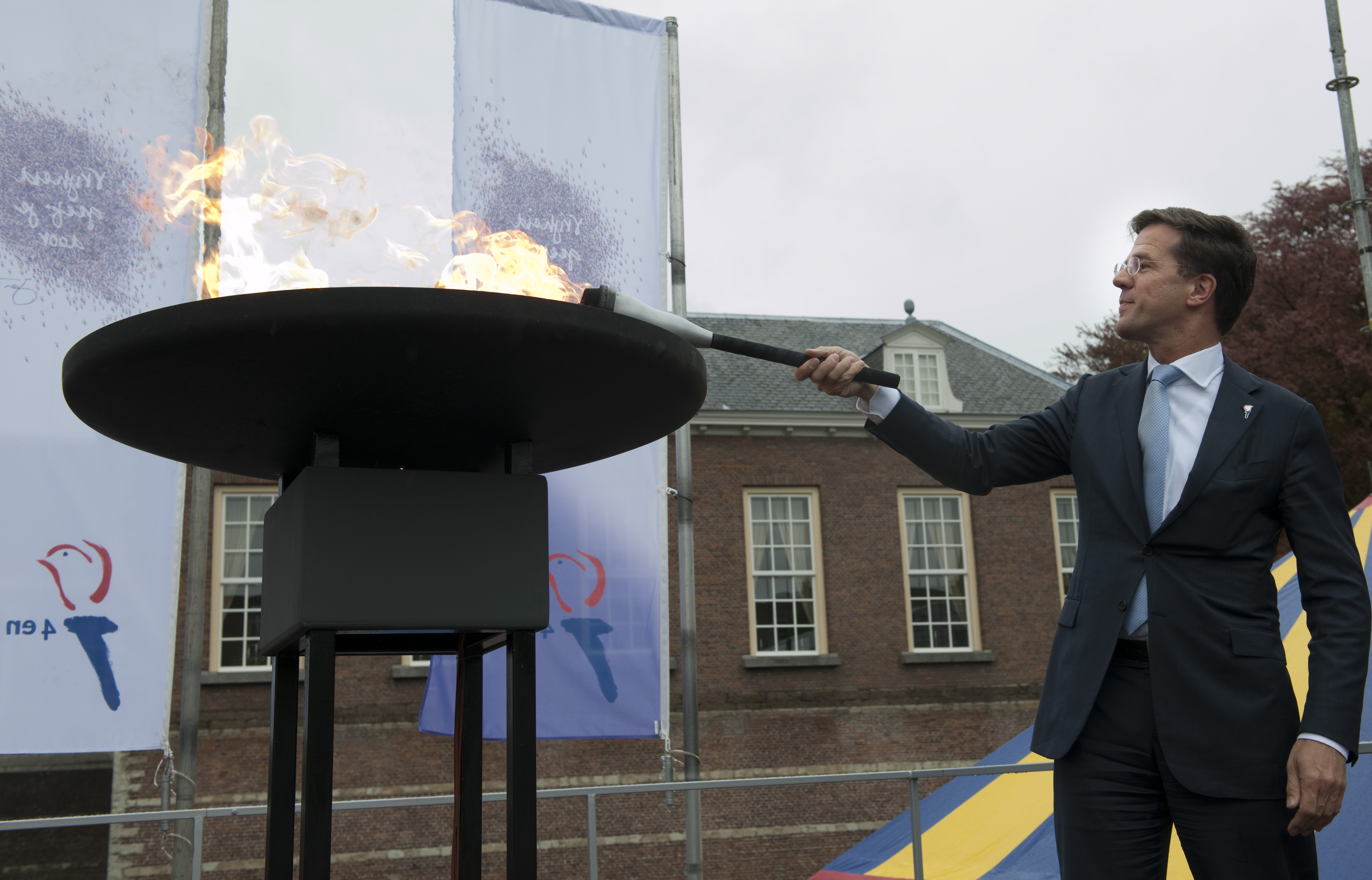
Mark Rutte, Prime Minister, lighting the fire in Breda (2012)

On the night of May 4 to 5, the mayor of Wageningen lights a fire in front of the historic Hotel de Wereld during a ceremony broadcast live on TV. From this historic location, walking groups will depart across the country to spread the flames. This is an important moment for the Netherlands as it transitions from commemorating on May 4 to celebrating liberation on May 5. The Prime Minister traditionally lights the fire, officially kicking off the liberation festivities.

=== Lecture ===
Since 1995, an inspirational lecture has been given almost every year on the day. The first one was given by Queen Beatrix.

=== Festival ===
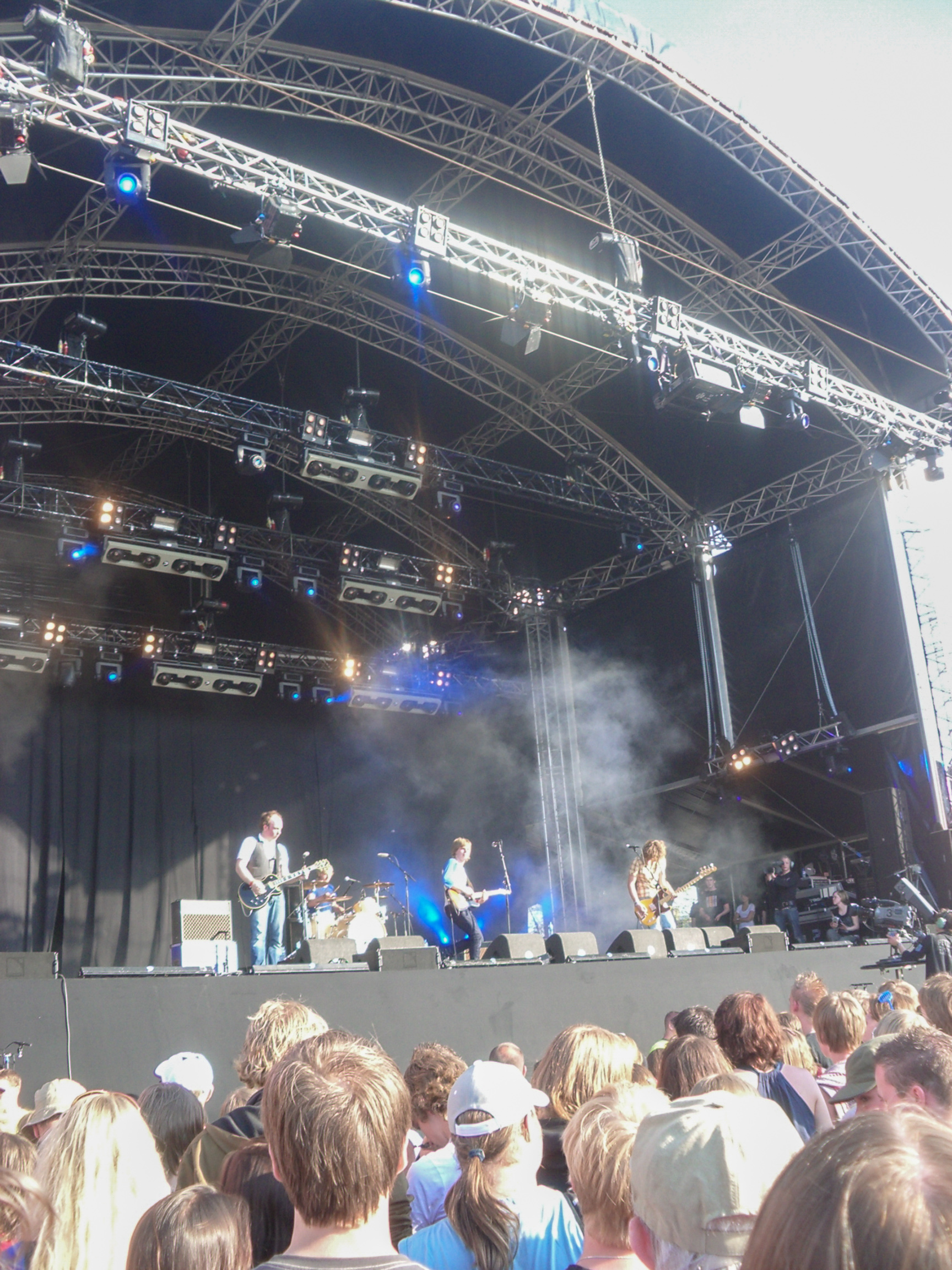
Music festival on Liberation Day 2008 in Zwolle

The Liberation Day celebration festivals on May 5 take place in fourteen provincial cities. These include major festivals such as the Liberation Event in Wageningen, which includes the Gelderland Liberation Festival, Bevrijdingspop in Haarlemmerhout, and the Overijssel Liberation Festival in Zwolle.

=== Veterans ===
Until 2004, the annual veterans' parade was held in Wageningen in the presence of Prince Bernhard. After Prince Bernhard's death, the parade was changed to the Liberation Parade on May 5 in Wageningen and the annual National Veterans Day in June in The Hague.

=== Concerts ===
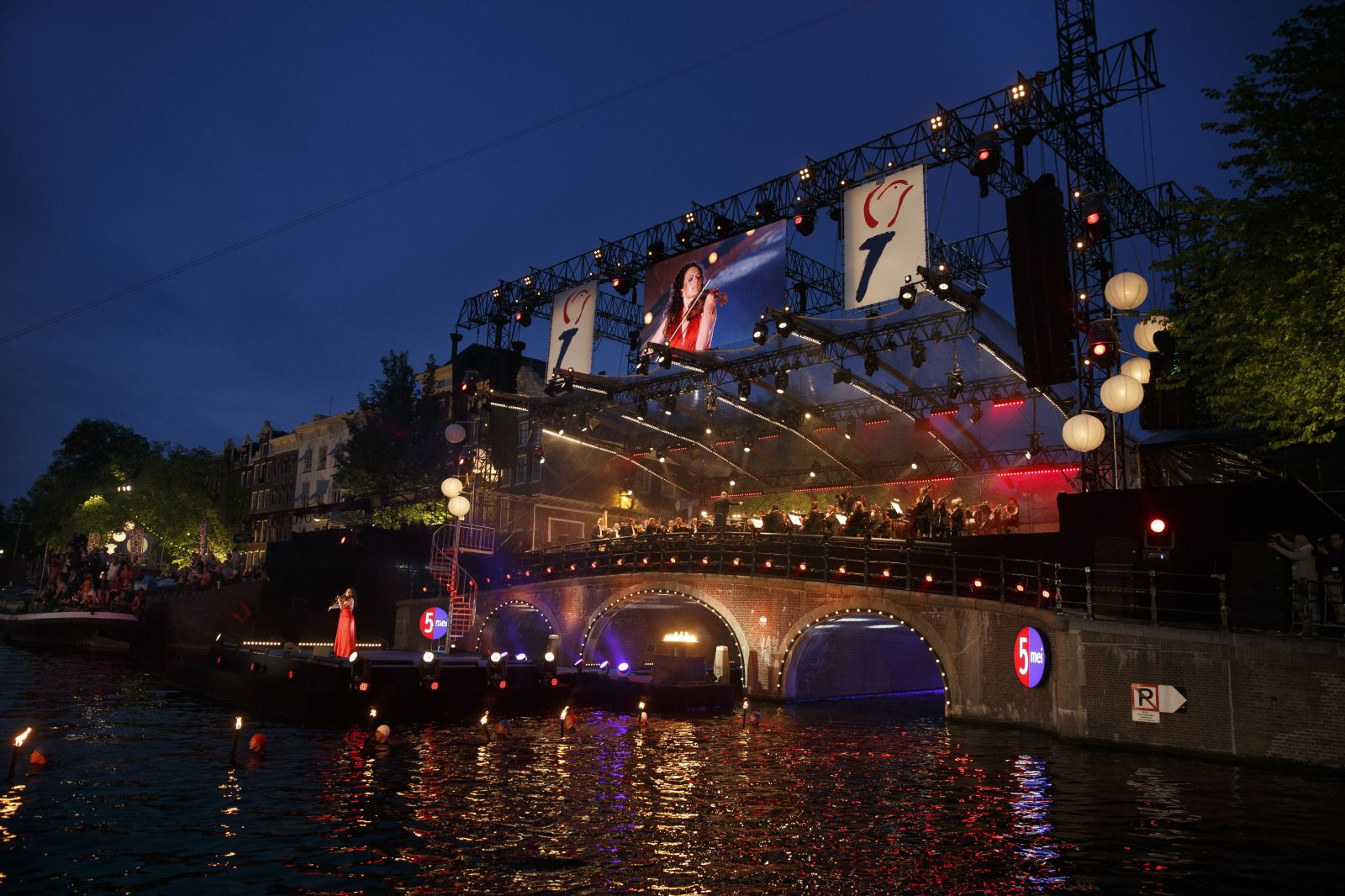
5 mei-concert 2014

Liberation Day concludes with the televised May 5 concert in Amsterdam, in the presence of the King and Queen. A different orchestra performs this concert each year, performed on a stage on the water in front of the Royal Theater Carré on the Amstel River. The concert always concludes with Vera Lynn's "We'll Meet Again," with the King and Queen sailing away in a boat.

=== Flags ===
The Dutch flag flies at its highest point on May 5 from sunrise to sunset, without an orange pennant (wimpel). A special pennant is available for use on Liberation Day. The pennant may also be used on August 15, which marks the end of World War II in the former Dutch East Indies.

== See also ==
- Battle of the Netherlands
- Liberation of the Netherlands
- Liberation Day
- Liberation of Arnhem
- Marine memorial
- Victory in Europe Day
