= National Remembrance 15 August 1945 =

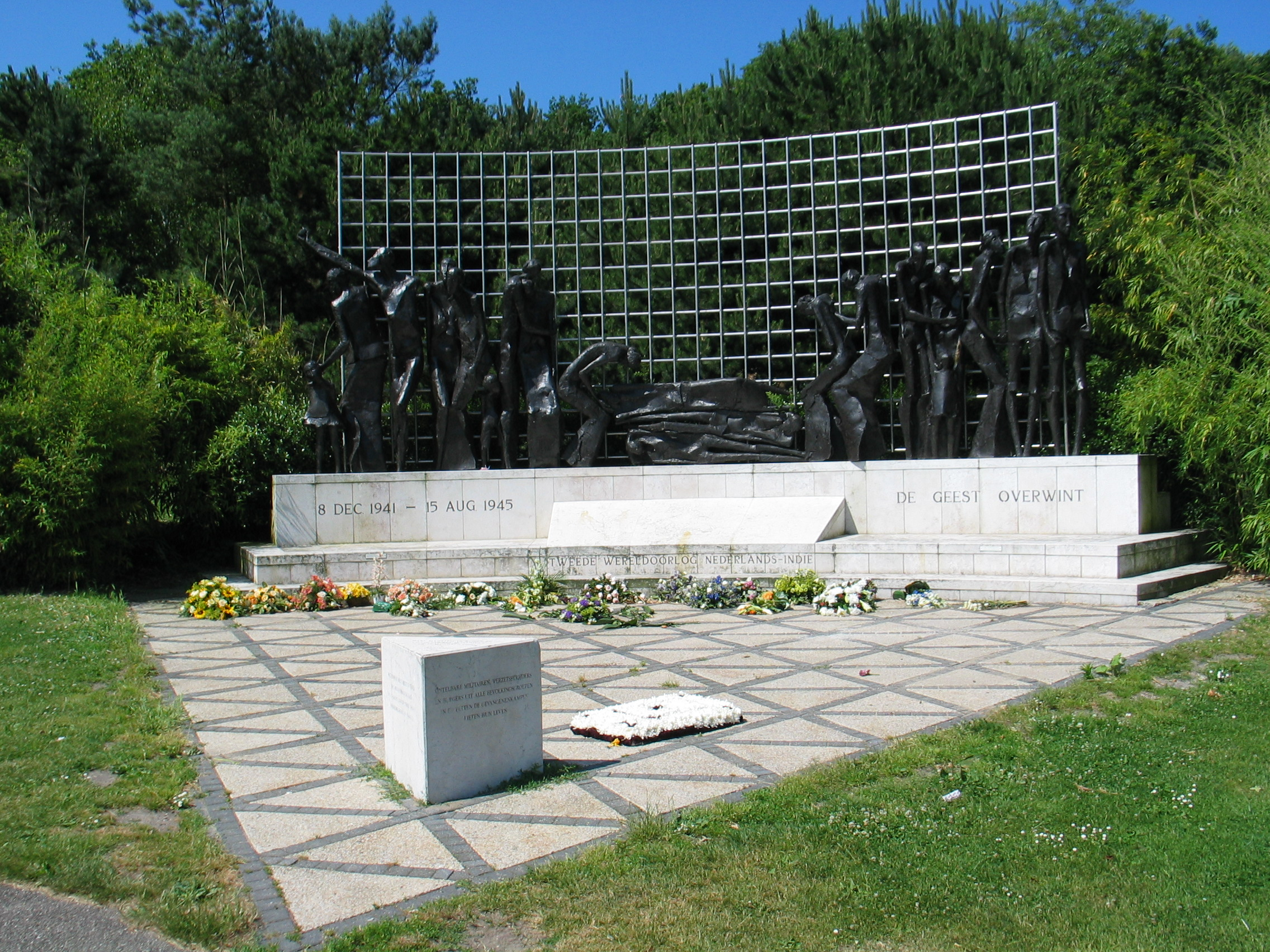
The Indies Monument, The Hague.

The National Remembrance 15 August 1945 (Dutch: Nationale Herdenking 15 augustus 1945) is an annual event at the Indies Monument in The Hague, the Netherlands, to commemorate the end of the Japanese occupation of the Dutch East Indies and the end of World War II. Taking place every 15 August since 1988, it is also known as the National Indies Remembrance (Dutch: Nationale Indiëherdenking).

== History ==
For the Kingdom of the Netherlands, World War II officially came to an end on 15 August 1945, while this already applied to the Netherlands proper on 5 May 1945 with the end of World War II in Europe. For the two million Indo Dutch in the Netherlands, there was no commemoration of the events of the Second World War in the Dutch East Indies and their consequences. It wasn't until 1988 that an opportunity for their own annual commemoration arose.

On 15 August 1970, a one-off commemoration of the surrender of Japan and the end of World War II in Southeast Asia took place in The Hague for the first time. Because there appeared to be a need from survivors and relatives to commemorate this historical period more extensively, this led to the foundation of the 15 August Commemoration Foundation on 25 March 1980 by 24 Indo Dutch organizations.

At the Indies Monument in The Hague, all victims of the Japanese occupation in the Dutch East Indies and its direct consequences have been commemorated since 1988. The melati, the Arabian jasmine, is worn as a symbol that stands for respect, involvement and compassion.

On this day, general flag protocol, as drawn up by the prime minister, applies. This means that on 15 August all government buildings will be flagged extensively to honor the formal end of the Second World War.

== See also ==
- End of World War II in Asia
- National Committee for 4 and 5 May
- Indies Remembrance Center
- Indies Monument
