= Remembrance of the Dead =

Dutch day of remembrance of war dead

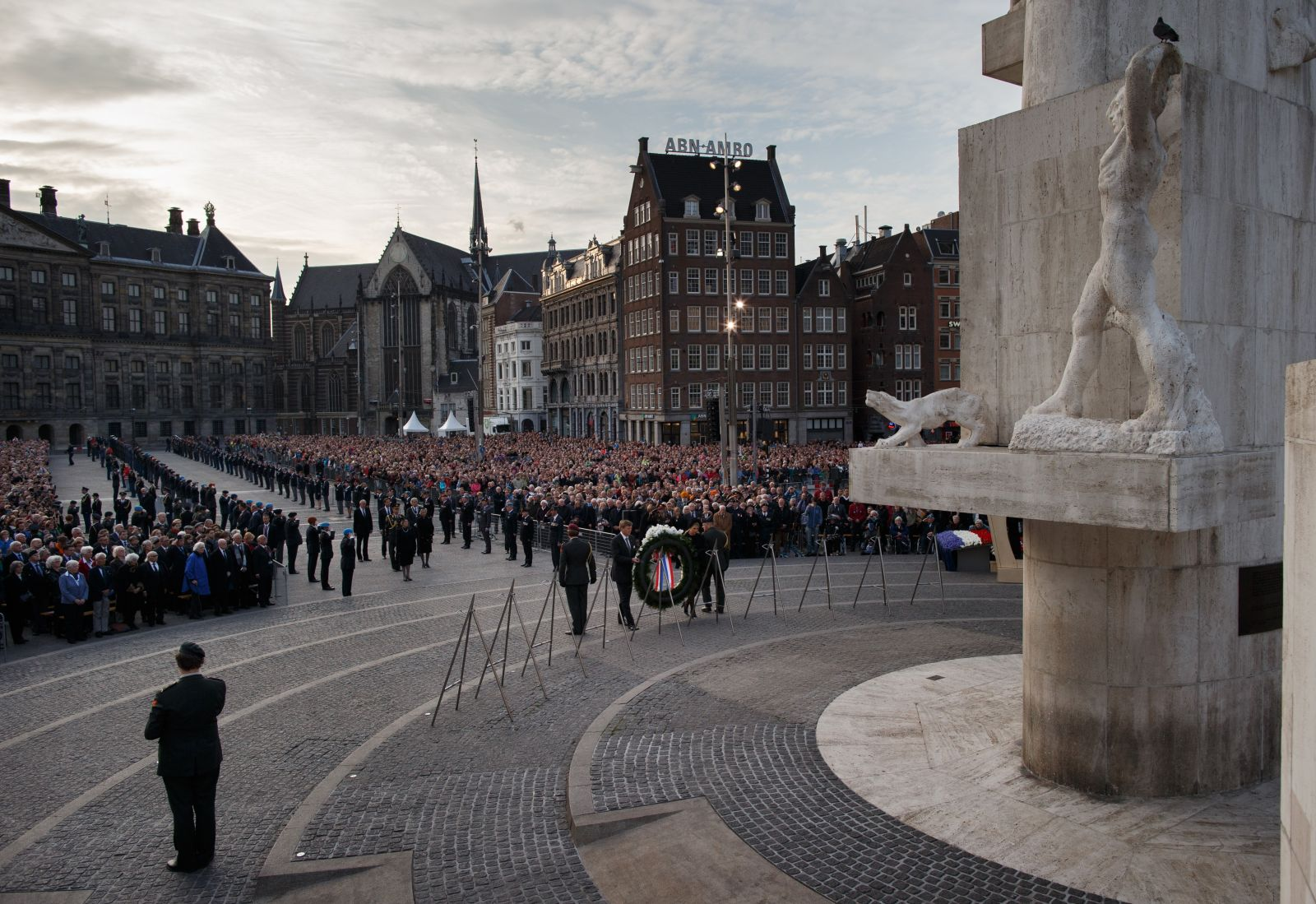
- Commemoration ceremony at Dam Square in Amsterdam on 4 May 2014
- Official name: Dodenherdenking
- Observed by: Netherlands
- Type: Remembrance
- Significance: Commemorates all war casualties since the beginning of WWII
- Observances: Two-minute silence
- Date: 4 May
- Next time: 4 May 2027
- Frequency: Annual
- Related to: Liberation Day

Remembrance of the Dead (Dutch: Dodenherdenking) is held annually on 4 May in the Netherlands. It commemorates all civilians and members of the armed forces of the Kingdom of the Netherlands who have died in wars or peacekeeping missions since the beginning of the Second World War.

== Definition ==
Since 2011 the official text of the Memorandum for Remembrance Day on 4 May is as follows:

During the national commemoration of Remembrance Day we remember all victims – civilians and soldiers – who have been killed or murdered in the Kingdom of the Netherlands or anywhere else in the world in war situations or during peace-keeping operations since the outbreak of the Second World War.

— Memorandum 2011

It is organized nationally by the National Committee for 4 and 5 May, but local committees still apply their own interpretation to the commemorations and also bear responsibility for that interpretation.

== Description ==
Dodenherdenking in Amsterdam 1962, Dutch newsreel

Until 1961 the commemoration only related to the Dutch victims of World War II. Since 1961, the victims of other military conflicts (such as the Indonesian National Revolution in Indonesia) and peacekeeping missions (such as in Lebanon or Bosnia) are remembered on 4 May as well.

Traditionally, the main ceremonies are observed in Amsterdam at the National Monument on Dam Square. This ceremony is usually attended by members of the cabinet and the royal family, military leaders, representatives of the resistance movement and other social groups.

At 20:00, two minutes of silence is observed across the Netherlands. Public transport is stopped as well as all other traffic. Radio and television only broadcast the ceremonies from 19:00 until 20:30. Since 4 May 1994, flags, having hung at half-staff from 18:00, are then hoisted to the music of the Wilhelmus, the Dutch national anthem. Since 2001, it is allowed to let the flag hang at half-staff.

The main commemorations in Amsterdam are broadcast by the public broadcaster NOS and there are ceremonies in all Dutch cities and other places as well. Especially notable are those at the Waalsdorpervlakte near The Hague where many Dutch resistance fighters were executed during the war, and at the war cemetery Grebbeberg, which are broadcast by the commercial broadcasting companies. In many towns, before or after the two minutes of silence, people gather around a monument, listen to speeches, and lay down flowers to remember the dead.

The next day, on 5 May, people celebrate the liberation of the nation from the German occupation of 1940 to 1945.

== See also ==
- Netherlands in World War II
