= Bronbeek =

Coordinates: 51°59′41″N 5°57′0″E

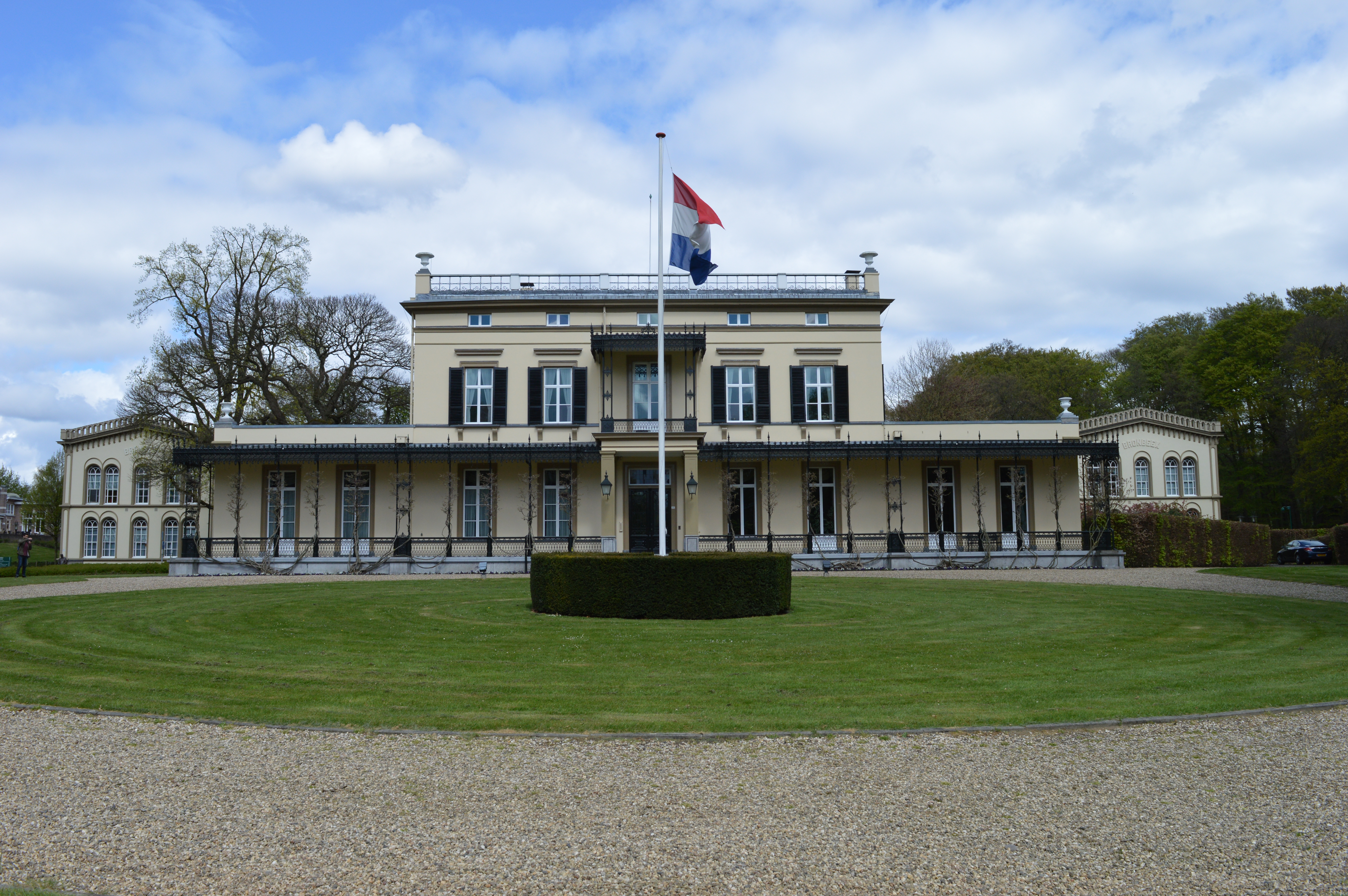
Bronbeek in 2016

Bronbeek is a former royal palace in Arnhem, Netherlands. It is now a museum and a home for elderly soldiers.

Bronbeek was built early in the 19th century. In 1845 William III of the Netherlands bought it. He donated it to the Dutch state in 1859 and it became a home for disabled KNIL soldier three years later. The inhabitants took their collections of 'souvenirs' with them. This turned into a museum about the Dutch East Indies.

In 2004, 50 former soldiers had their home in Bronbeek.

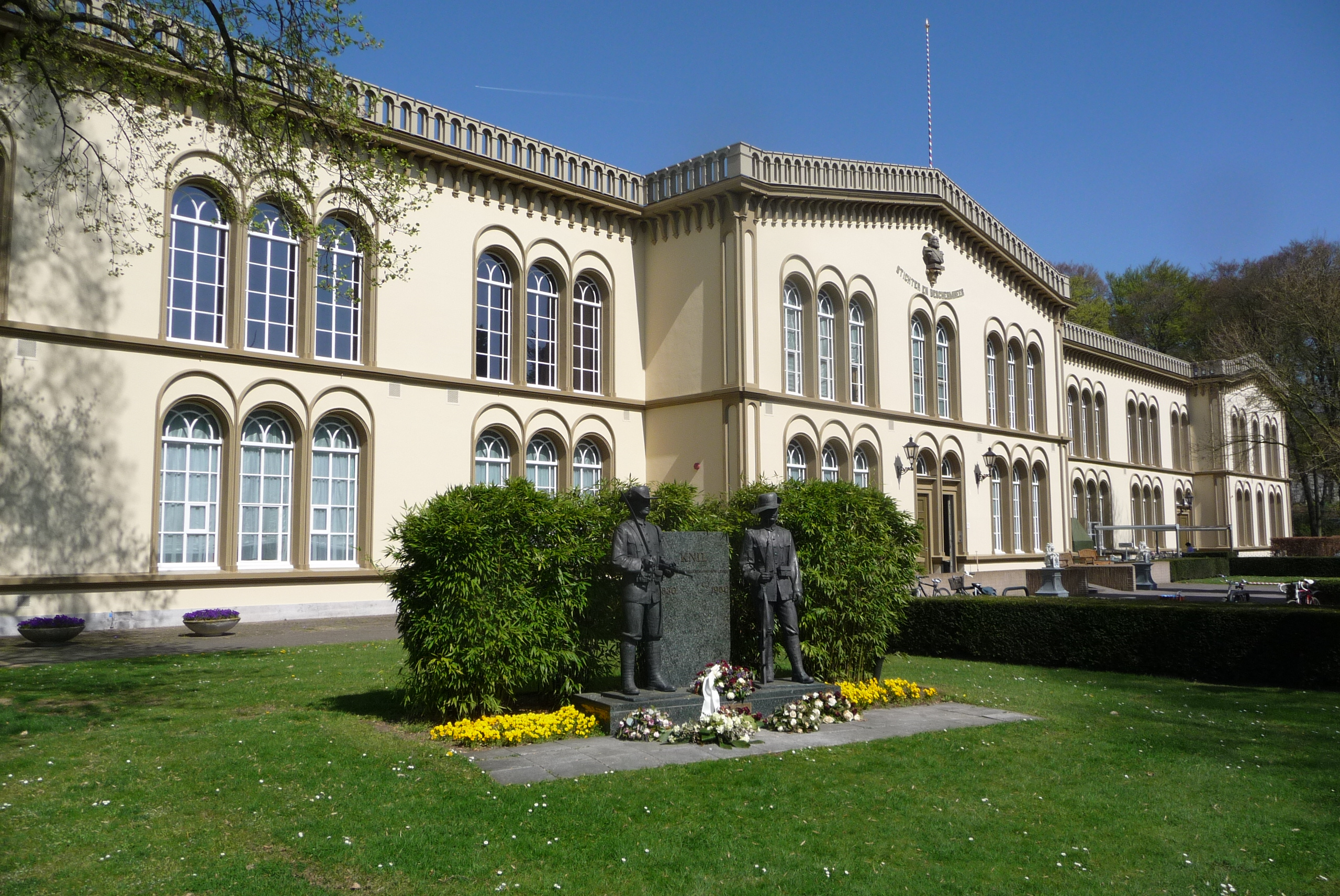
The main building
