= Wayne F. Miller =

American photographer (1918–2013)

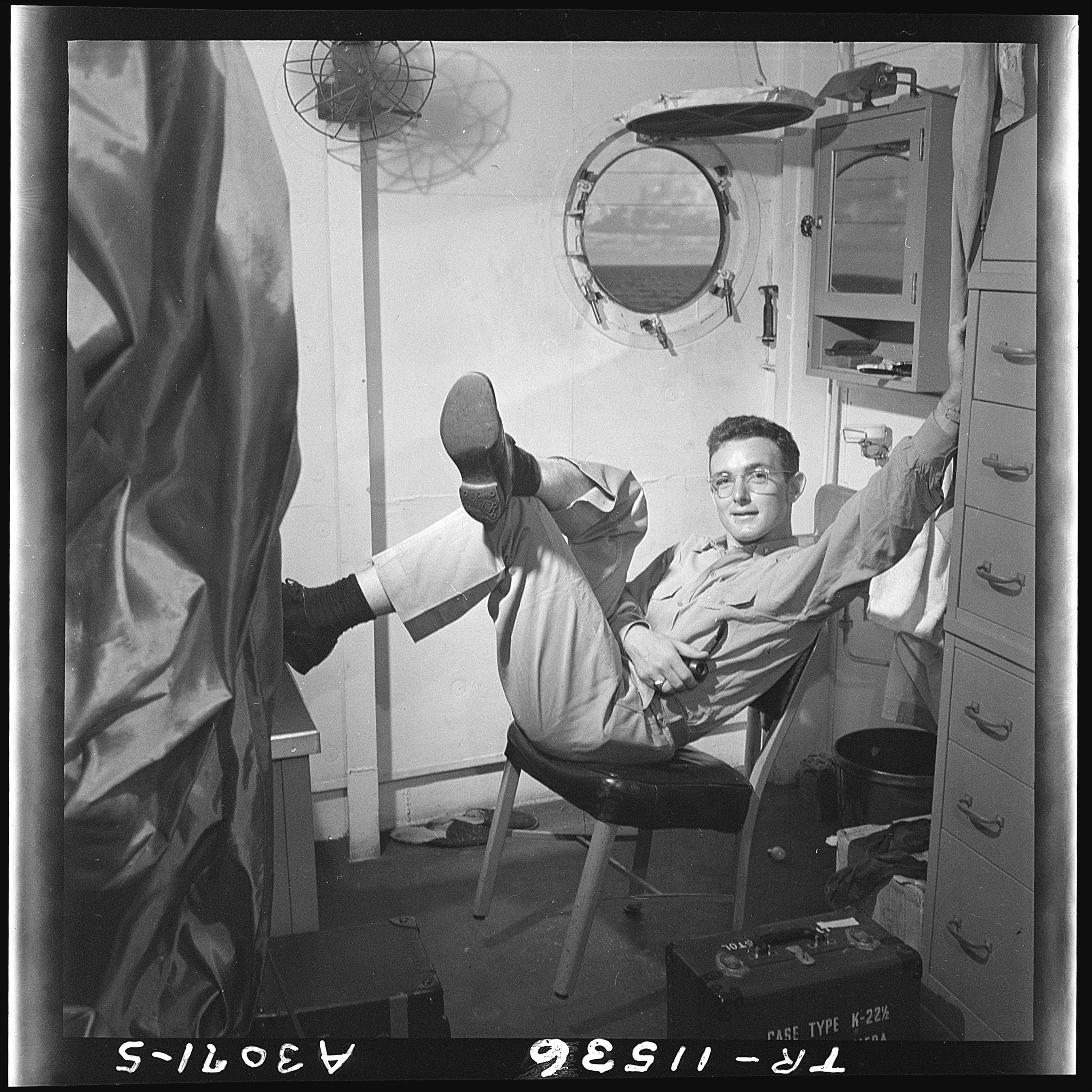
- Born: September 19, 1918; Chicago, Illinois
- Died: May 22, 2013 (aged 94); Orinda, California

Wayne Forest Miller (September 19, 1918 – May 22, 2013) was an American photographer known for his series of photographs The Way of Life of the Northern Negro. Active as a photographer from 1942 until 1975, he was a contributor to Magnum Photos beginning in 1958.

== Early life ==
Miller was born in Chicago, Illinois., the son of a doctor and a nurse, who gave him a camera as a high school graduation present. He went on to study banking at the University of Illinois Urbana-Champaign, while also working on the side as a photographer. From 1941 to 1942 he studied at the Art Centre School of Los Angeles.

== Career ==
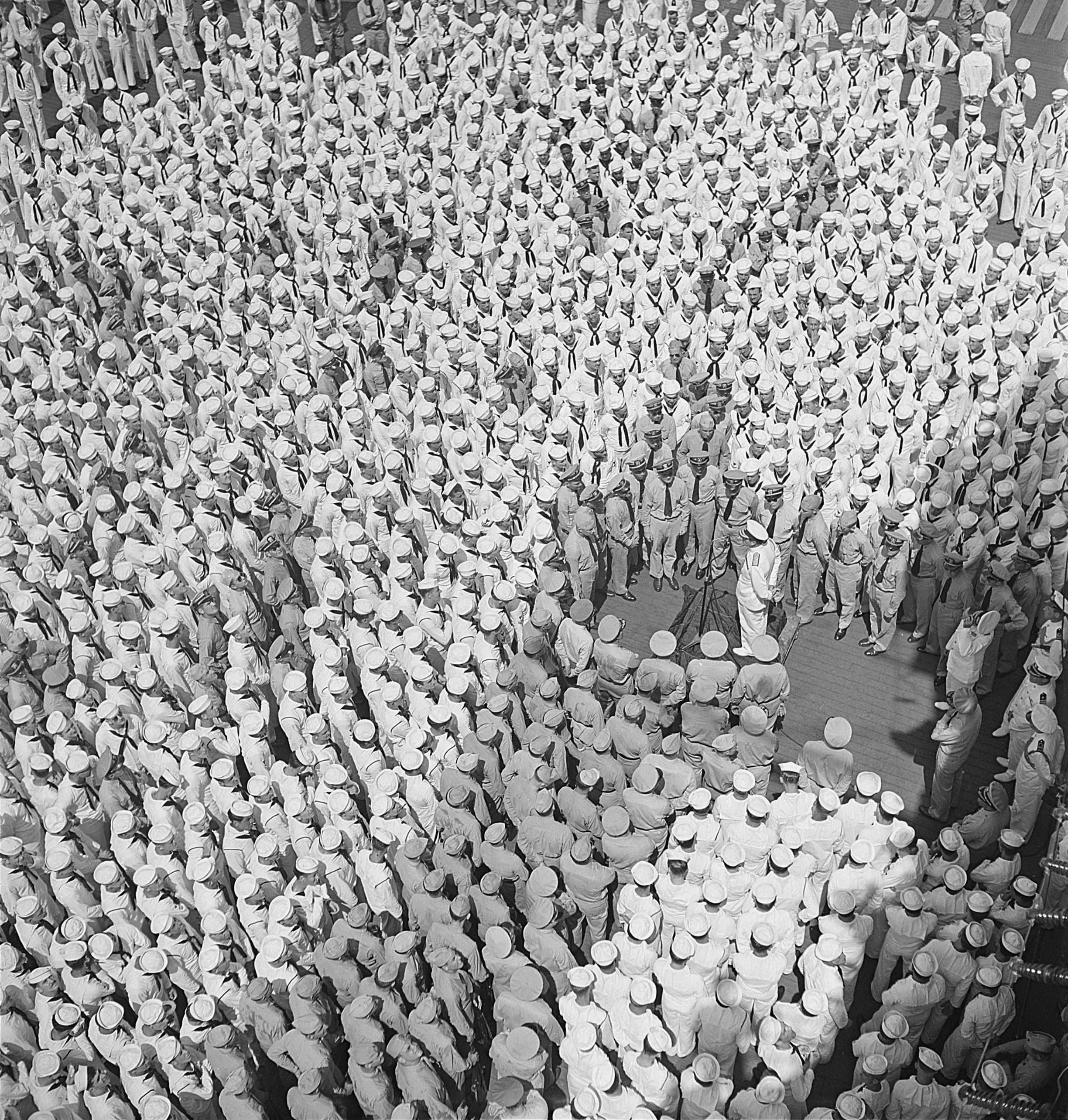
Wayne F. Miller: Adm. Lord Louis Mountbatten, RN, addresses personnel aboard the USS Saratoga (CV-3) at Trincomalee, Ceylon

=== War photographer ===
Miller then served as a lieutenant in the U.S. Navy where he was assigned to Edward Steichen's World War II Naval Aviation Photographic Unit. He was among the first Western photographers to document the destruction at Hiroshima.

=== Chicago ===
After the war he resettled in Chicago. He won two consecutive Guggenheim fellowships in 1946-1948, with which he worked on The Way of Life of the Northern Negro. These images were published in his book Chicago's South Side, 1946-1948. This project documented the wartime migration of African Americans northward, specifically looking at the black community on the south side of Chicago, covering all the emotions in daily life. The people depicted are mostly ordinary people, but some celebrities appear, such as Lena Horne, Ella Fitzgerald, Duke Ellington and Paul Robeson.

=== Publication and recognition ===
Miller taught at the Institute of Design in Chicago before commissioning a Modernist house for their growing family from architect Mario Corbett in Orinda, California in 1953. He was freelancing for Life and with his wife Joan also worked with Edward Steichen as an associate curator for The Family of Man exhibition and accompanying book which opened at New York City's Museum of Modern Art in 1955. Steichen selected eight of Miller's photographs, including two of the birth of the photographer's son, for the show which traveled the world and was seen by more than 9 million visitors.

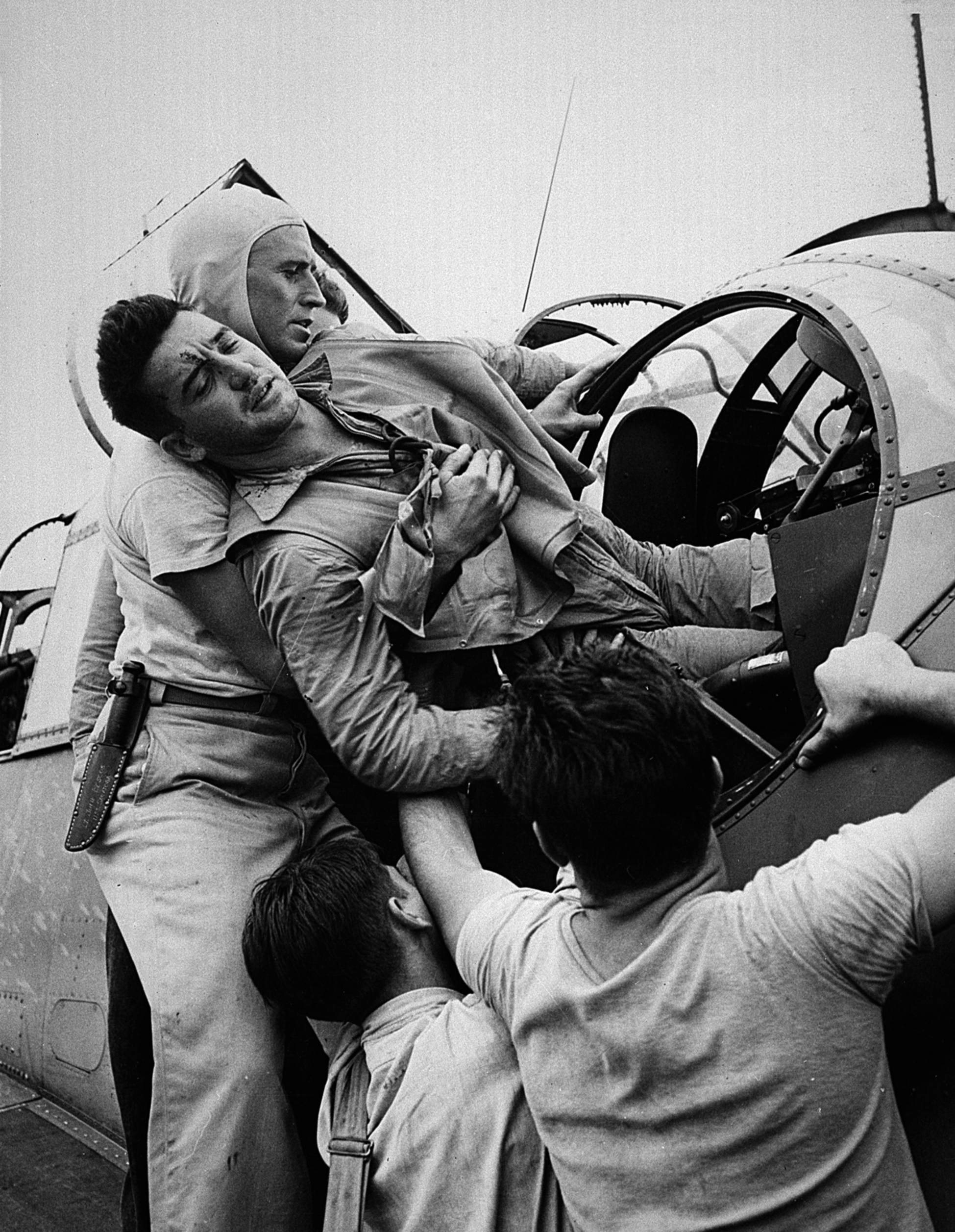
Wayne F. Miller Grumman TBF wounded crew member Nov 1943

Miller provided the photographs for A Baby's First Year (1956) with Benjamin Spock and John B. Reinhart. Undertaking a three-year project inspired by The Family of Man, he intensively photographed his own family. The resulting book The World is Young was published in 1958 and appeared as a 10-page picture essay in LIFE (13 Oct 1958).

Miller was a contract photographer for Life and served as president of Magnum Photos from 1962-1966. Miller was a longtime member of the American Society of Magazine Photographers and was named chairman in 1954.

In 2000 Miller was awarded Missouri Honor Medal for Distinguished Service in Journalism, Missouri School of Journalism, University of Missouri, Columbia, MO

=== Environmentalism ===
In 1970 Miller joined the Corporation for Public Broadcasting as executive director of the Public Broadcasting Environmental Centre. After his retirement from photography in 1975, he co-founded the Forest Landowners of California organisation and worked to protect California's forests, in particular fighting tax laws that encouraged the felling of redwoods.

== Death and legacy ==
Miller died on May 22, 2013, at his home in Orinda, California, age 94, survived by his wife of 70 years, the former Joan Baker (January 21, 1921 – March 7, 2014), and four children.

== Collections ==
The Wayne Miller Archive is held at the Center for Creative Photography (University of Arizona). MIller's work is also held in the permanent collections of the Museum of Fine Arts Houston, the Smart Museum of Art, the Art Institute of Chicago, and the National Museum of African American History and Culture.

== Bibliography ==
Books by Wayne Miller:

- A Baby's First Year. New York: Duell, Sloan and Pearce, 1956. With text by Benjamin Spock and John B. Reinhart.
- The World is Young. New York: Ridge Press, 1958.
- Chicago's South Side: 1946–1948. Berkeley: University of California Press, 2000. ISBN 978-0-520-22316-5.
- At Ease: Navy Men of World War II. New York: Harry N. Abrams, 2004. ISBN 978-0-8109-4805-1. By Evan Bachner. With work by Miller, Horace Bristol, Victor Jorgensen, and Barrett Gallagher.
- Chicago Photographs: LaSalle Bank Photography Collection. Chicago, Ill.: LaSalle Bank, 2004. ISBN 0-9702452-3-8. By Carol Ehlers. Includes work by Miller.

Books about Wayne Miller

- Light, Ken. "Wayne Miller: World War II and The Family of Man". In Ken Light, Witness in Our Time: Working Lives of Documentary Photographers. Washington, D.C.: Smithsonian Institution Press, 2000. ISBN 1-56098-923-8; ISBN 1-56098-948-3.
- Wayne F. Miller: Photographs 1942-1958. Brooklyn, NY: Powerhouse Books, 2008. ISBN 978-1-57687-462-2.
