= Charles Fenno Jacobs =

American photographer

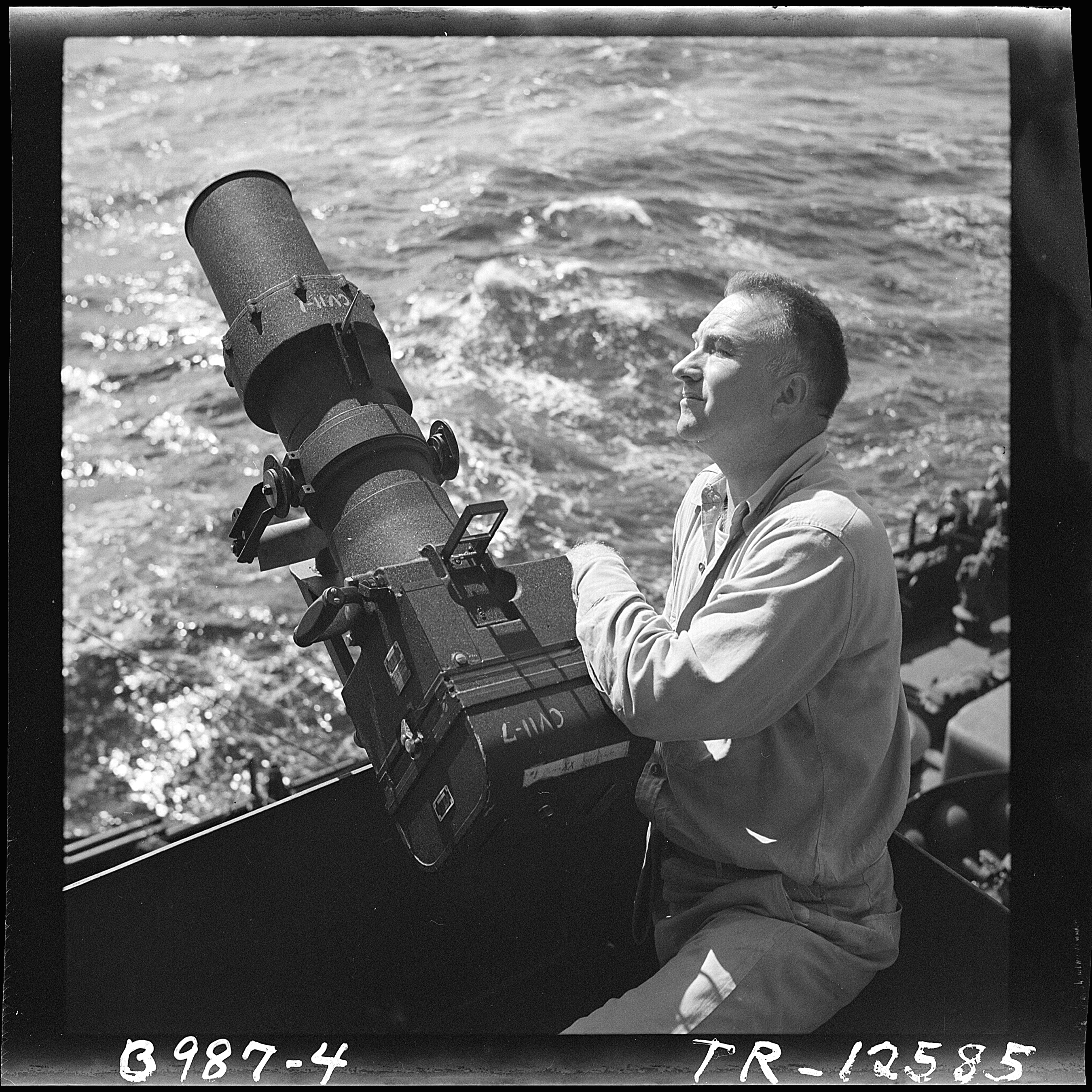
- LCDR Charles Fenno Jacobs, USNR, poses with his Fairchild F-56 camera aboard USS Iowa (BB-61) in December 1944.
- Born: December 14, 1904; Waltham, Massachusetts
- Died: June 27, 1974 (aged 69); Englewood, New Jersey
- Occupation: photographer

Charles Fenno Jacobs (December 14, 1904 – June 27, 1974; often credited as Fenno Jacobs) was an American photographer active in the mid-20th century.

== Early life ==
Jacobs was born in Waltham, Massachusetts. His Dutch-descended father was a steamfitter. An enfant terrible extraordinaire, he did not graduate from high school and rumor has it he dropped out or was expelled in 8th grade. In spite of this, he got an education on the fly, read a great deal of contemporary literature, met almost everyone of the period worth knowing, and was a fine writer. His older sister Frances reports that he was the red-headed scourge of the neighbourhood as a child.

== Photography career ==
Reaching his majority, he joined the Merchant Marines and traveled the world for a period of years. After leaving the Merchant Marines, he moved to New York where he married his first wife, Kit, and began his career as a photographer by taking pictures for a commercial real estate firm. With his first 35mm camera, he also began taking candid shots of New Yorkers and of New York and began going to magazine offices, offering to work for practically nothing, according to his third wife, Gloria, who was at the time of their meeting a researcher for Fortune magazine. His particular talent was in catching his subjects at their most revealing moments.

He became a photographer for Time, Inc. and was soon traveling as a photographer throughout South America as well as the United States, taking pictures for Life, National Geographic, U.S. Camera, and Fortune. Some of his more memorable photos were of the Mexico City flower market and agave fields in Mexico, a Bolivian toddler on the back of her mother, with one large black eye fixed on the photographer, and a down-at-heels banana dictator in a gilt-braided uniform. His color covers for Fortune were always striking.

He married his second wife, Marjorie Kent, in New York in 1941 and together they had two daughters, Shelley Isom and Kathe Stolz.

=== World War II ===
Shortly after the Japanese attack on Pearl Harbor, Edward Steichen recruited Jacobs to join his Naval Aviation Photographic Unit. The U.S. Navy had established this special group to document and publicize its aviation activities.

Jacobs, like the other photographers in the Naval Aviation Photographic Unit, followed Steichen's advice to concentrate on the human side of modern war. He photographed aircraft workers in California, capturing the then novel sight of female factory workers. On another assignment he photographed life aboard the battleship USS New Jersey, shooting the activities of the crew off- and on-duty. Other of Jacobs's images capture the earnestness of young aviation cadets, the humiliation of a Japanese prisoner of war on the deck of a battleship, and melancholy scenes of Navy pilots on leave with their dates.

Selected Naval Aviation Photographic Unit photographs by C. Fenno Jacobs

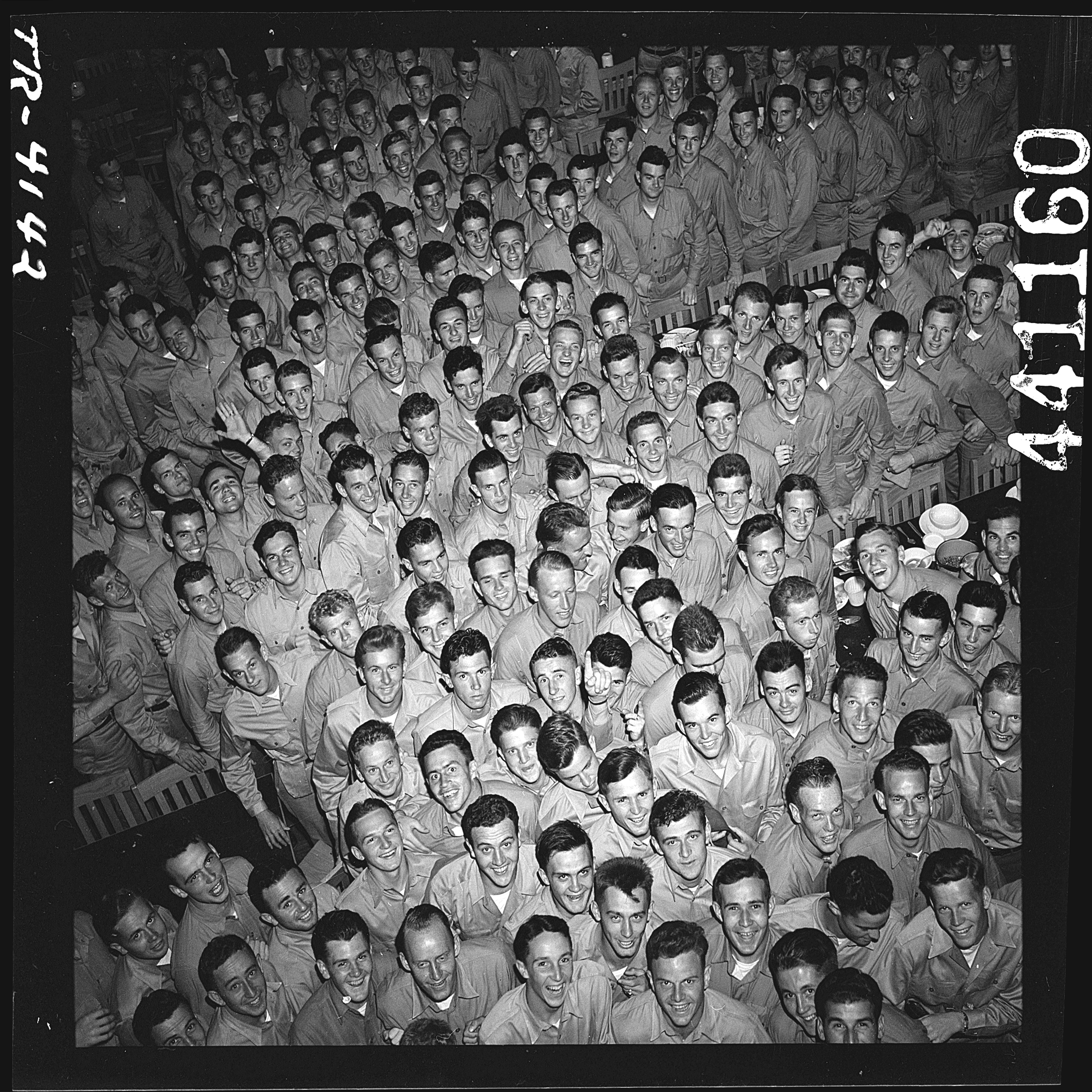
Young men training at pre-flight school at Del Monte Hotel, Del Monte, Calif., grin as they file out of the mess hall. [July 1943]

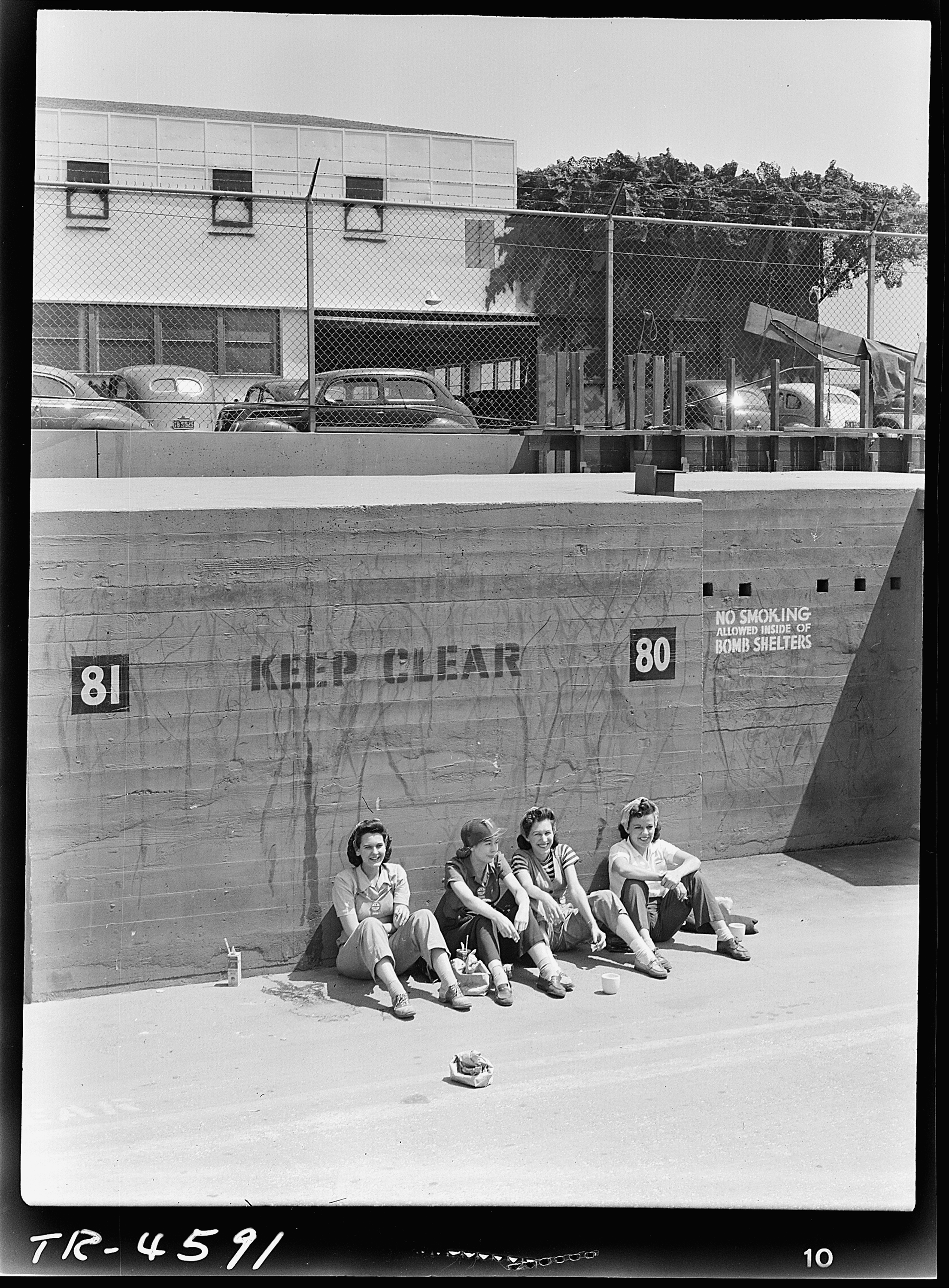
Lunchtime at the Vega aircraft plant, Burbank, Calif. A quartet of girl workers. [Aug 1943]

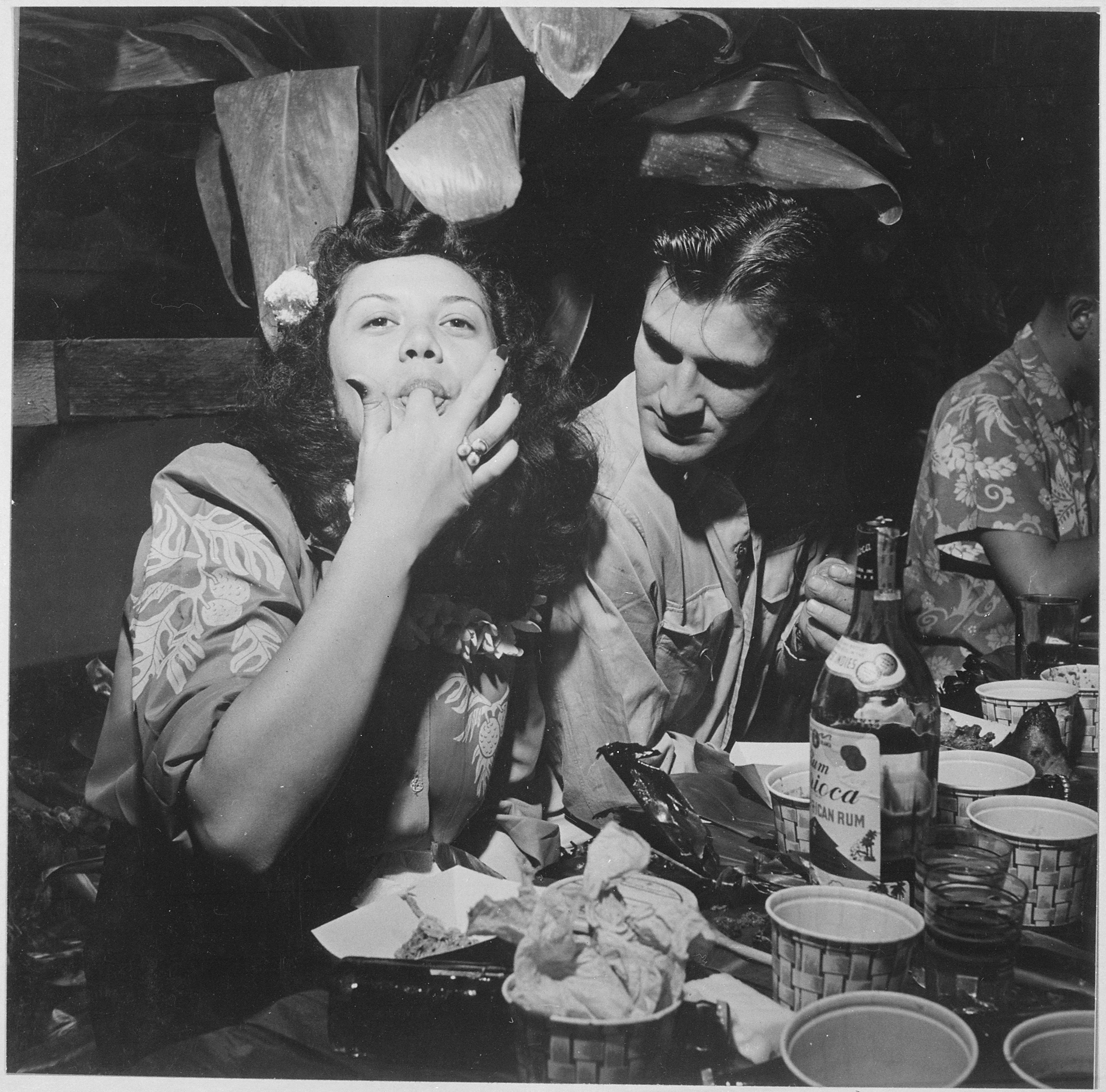
Navy pilots relax and enjoy feminine companionship, sports and entertainment at Chris Holmes Rest Home, maintained for pilots on leave from combat. Fingers replace forks at chow-time. Hawaii, March 1944.

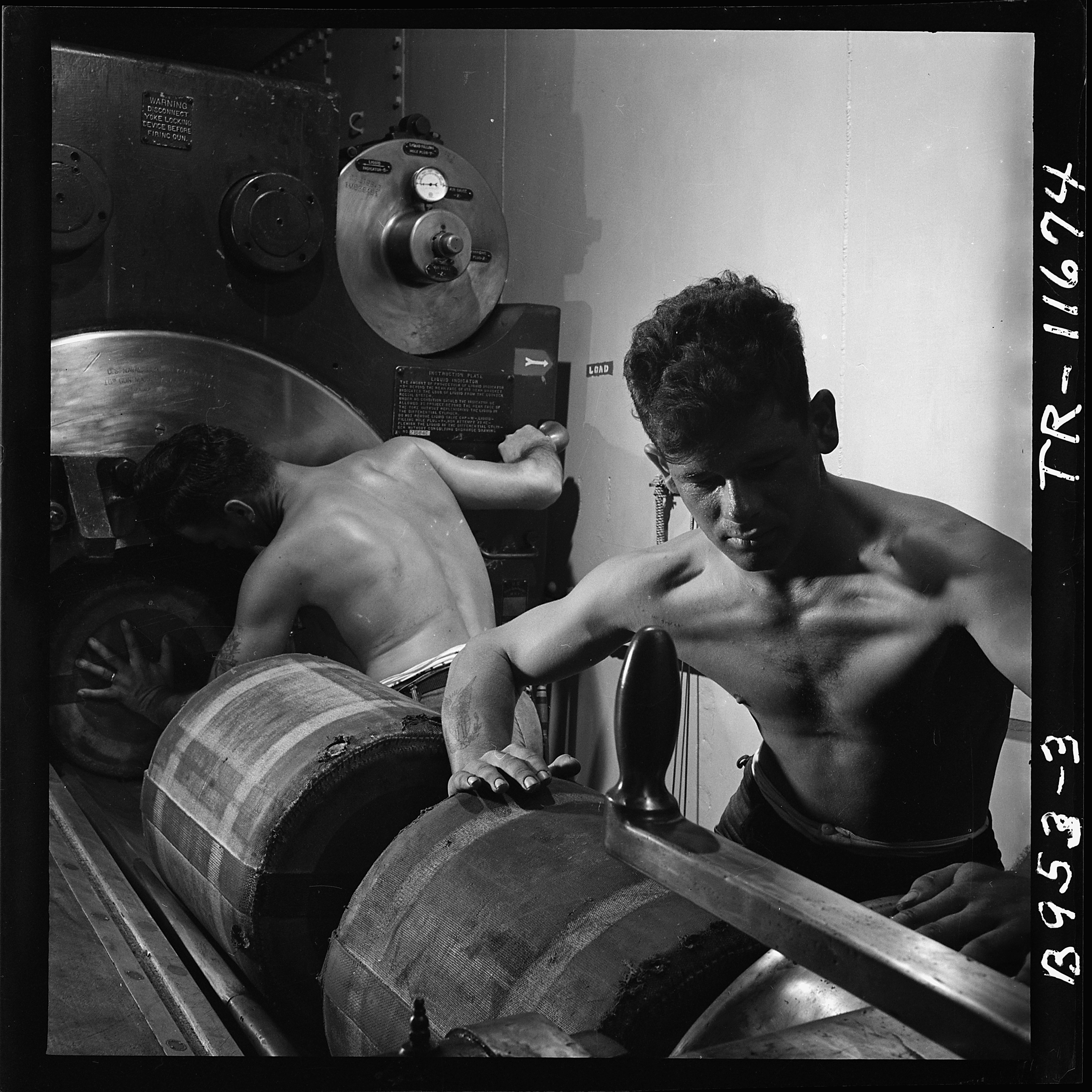
Barbette of 16" gun on board the USS New Jersey (BB-62). Gunners packing in bags of powder which will fire the huge shell already in gun. [Nov 1944]

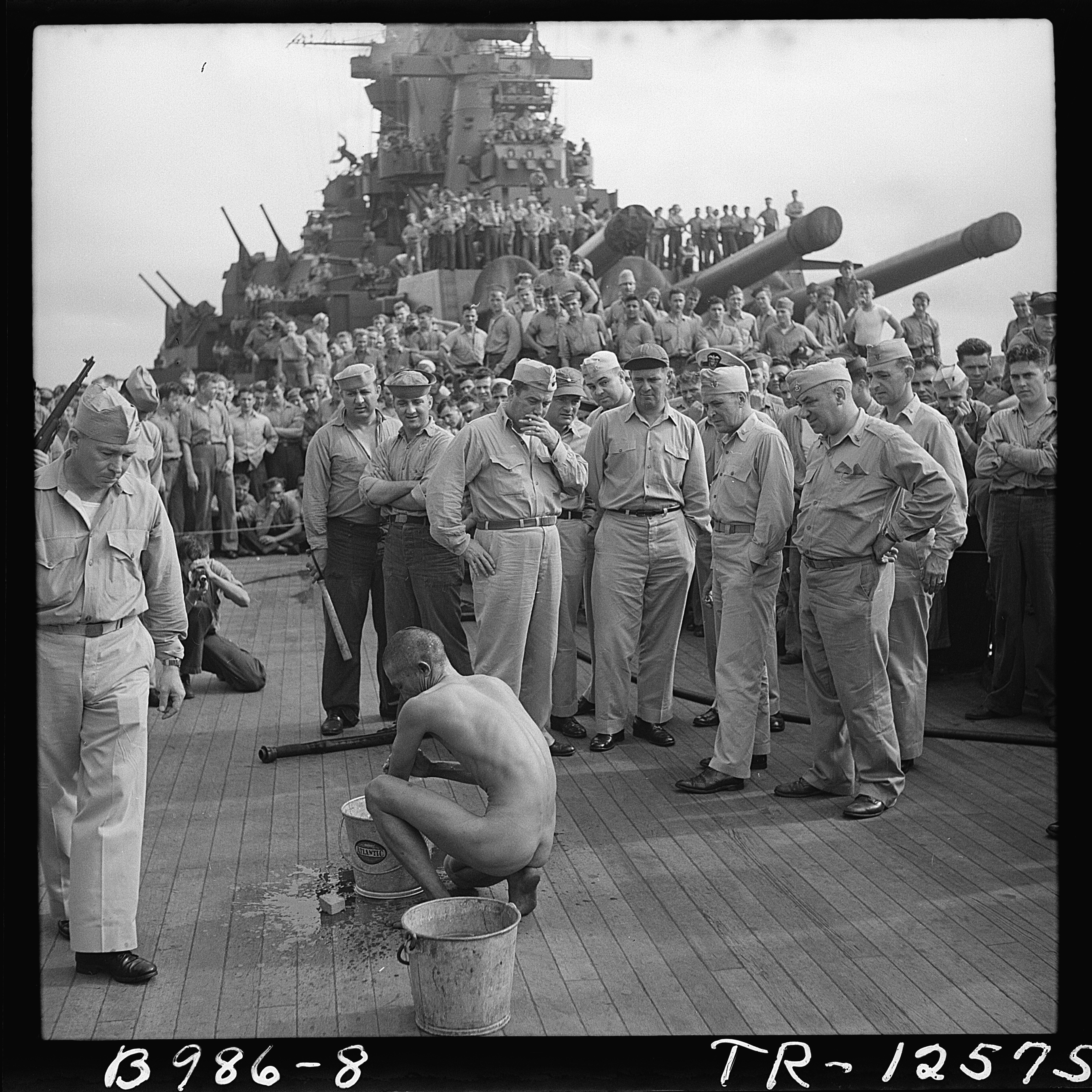
The crewmen of the battleship USS New Jersey watch a Japanese prisoner of war bathe himself before he is issued GI clothing. [Nov 1944]

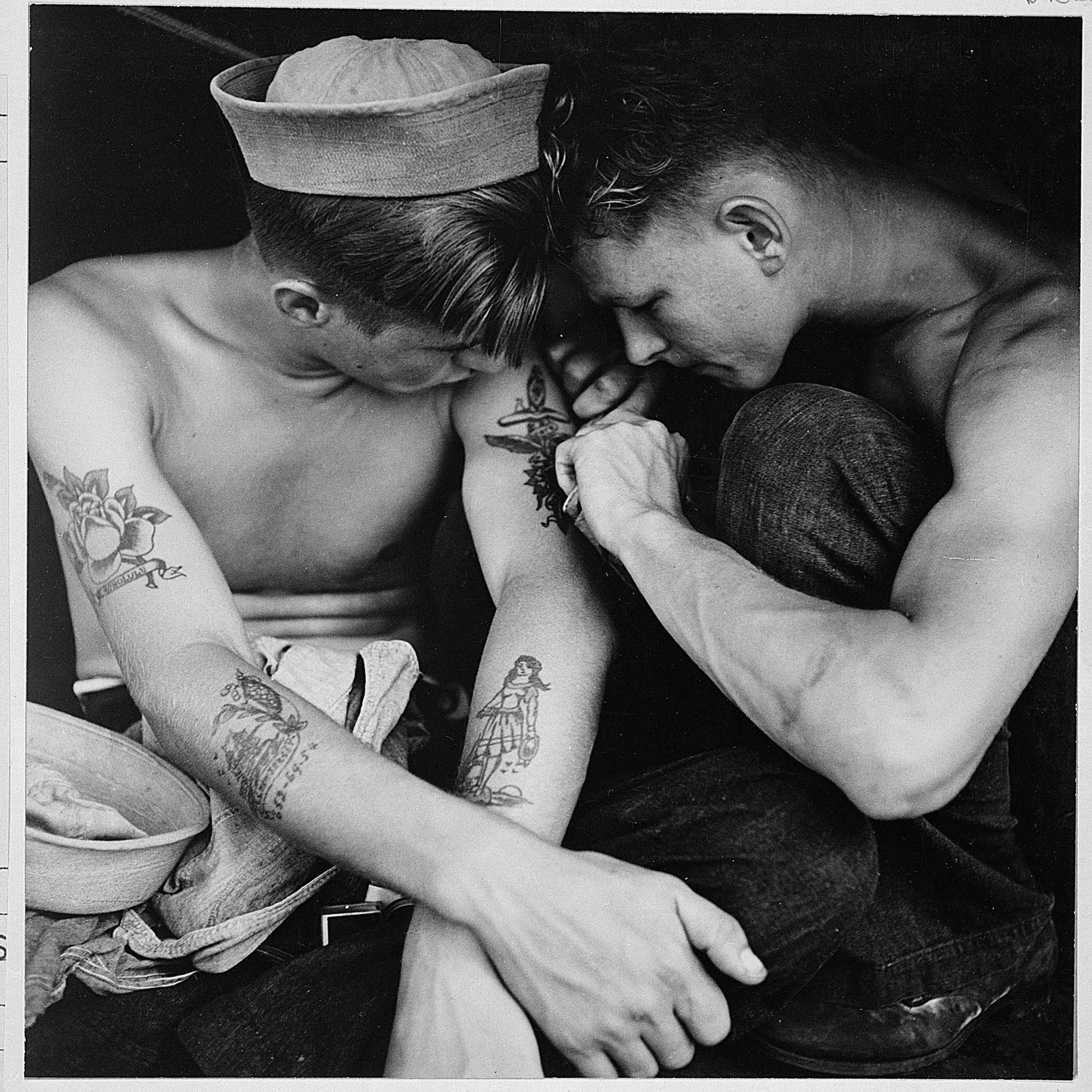
Much tattooed sailor aboard the USS New Jersey [Dec 1944]

When the war ended, Jacobs and two of his colleagues, Horace Bristol and Victor Jorgensen, still dressed in uniforms, walked into the offices of Fortune and boldly proposed that the magazine hire them, and assign each a different part of the world as his beat. The magazine agreed and Jacobs was assigned to cover Europe in the immediate postwar years. He photographed the airlift to Berlin, German post-war politics and landscape, the industrial Ruhr and images of the ruined German cities. He spent time in eastern Europe, documenting life under Communism, as well as in France, Italy and the British Isles.

=== Recognition ===
"Power in the Pacific", a group exhibition of the Steichen unit, was held at the Museum of Modern Art in January 1945.

A photograph of Jacobs was in The Family of Man exhibition, created by Edward Steichen in 1955 at the Museum of Modern Art in New York, which resulted in a book of the same name. Since then Jacobs' work has appeared in several major shows and the 1981 book Steichen at War.

=== Other interests ===
In later life, Jacobs opened two restaurants, one on Maryland's Eastern Shore—grudgingly frying up hamburgers when obliged to instead of his wonderful soft shelled crabs with smithfield ham or chicken à la Maryland—and one in Marlboro, Vermont, where he fed, among others, the members of the Budapest Quartet and pianist Rudolf Serkin. A glowing review in The New York Times by Craig Claiborne provided him with customers for a summer.

Later he became an editor for a yachting magazine named Skipper based in Annapolis, Maryland, whose chief editor was Victor Jorgensen, fellow Navy photographer and longtime friend. A lover of yachting who once took his first wife down the Mississippi River, Jacobs bought a beautiful Old Matthews 42 foot yacht on which he traveled down the inland waterway to Florida. He lived on the boat several years with his third wife, Gloria. They were divorced but remained close friends for the rest of their lives.

Jacobs continued to take photographs through the early 1970s, combining his interests in travel and boating. He eventually and reluctantly retired and he died suddenly in Englewood, New Jersey, with his then partner, Helen Herbstman.
