= Fenno =

Fenno may refer to:

- Various concepts related to Finland

== People ==
- John Fenno, U.S. Federalist Party editor
- Richard Fenno, American political scientist
- Charles Fenno Hoffman, American author, poet and editor
- Charles Fenno Jacobs, American photographer
