= Edith Bristol =

San francisco bulletin editor

Edith Bristol (June 17, 1886 - February 16, 1946) was the women's editor of the San Francisco Call-Bulletin.

== Early life ==
Edith McPhee was born on June 17, 1886, in Alameda, California, the daughter of Horace Greely McPhee, pioneer California publisher and editor, and Harriet Bynon. Horace McPhee was the publisher of the Santa Paula Chronicle, the first newspaper where Edith McPhee worked.

She was part of the H. T. Club, a girls' society formed in Santa Ana, California, in 1900. The original members of the club were Viola Hill, Edith McPhee, Grace and Della Parker, Myrtle Millward, Florence Mullinix, Olive Wright, Lowell Garnett.

== Career ==
Edith Bristol was a drama editor for the San Francisco Call.

She entered the newspaper work in 1916 with Santa Paula Chronicle and remained with that paper for eight years; she then joined the staff of the Los Angeles Evening Herald in 1924; she transferred to the San Francisco Call in 1926, and was the assistant dramatic editor. In 1929 she was associated with the editorial department of the Fox Film corporation in Hollywood and was a scenario writer. She later returned to the San Francisco Call and became the women's editor, a position she held until her death. She published verse, stories and articles in magazines.

== Personal life ==
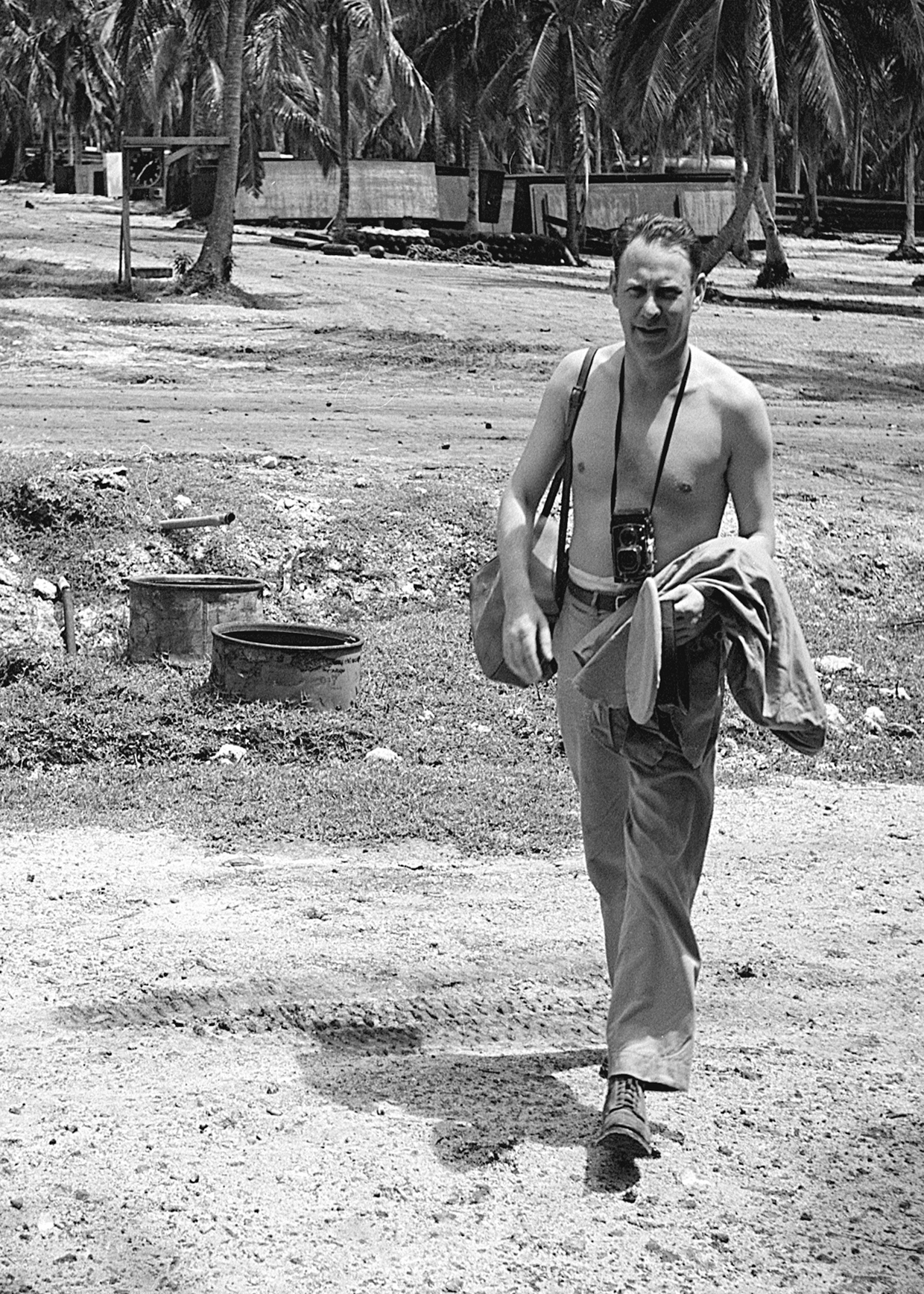
Lcdr. Horace Bristol, one of Capt. Steichen's ace photographers, goes to work, photographically recording the war, stripped to the waist, 1944

Edith McPhee married Laurence A. Bristol and had one son, Horace Richard Bristol, later a renowned photojournalist, whose work is now featured at the Smithsonian Institution.

After being left alone with a young son, she lived with her parents at 621 Pleasant Street, Santa Paula, California. The house was built in 1909 by Charles Godwin, originally from England. Later she moved at 1039 Clayton Street, San Francisco.

She died on February 16, 1946, in Alameda, California.
