= Naval Aviation Photographic Unit =

Naval Aviation Photographic Unit (official: Training Literature Field Unit No. 1)
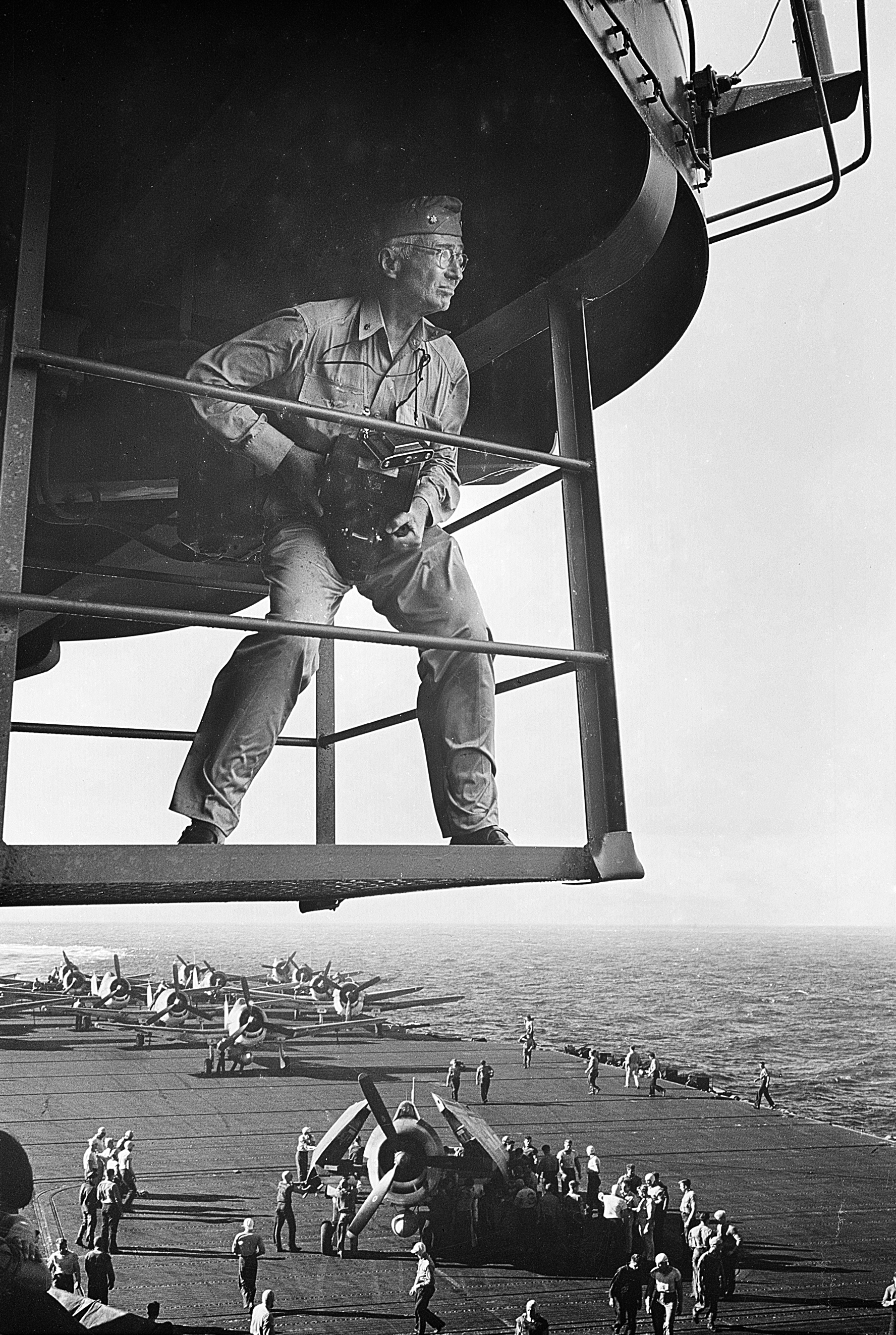
- Cmdr Edward Steichen photographed above the deck of the aircraft carrier USS Lexington (CV-16) by Ens Victor Jorgensen, November 1943.
- Active: 1942–1945
- Country: United States
- Branch: United States Navy

The Naval Aviation Photographic Unit was a group of military photographers in the United States Navy during the Second World War, under the command of Edward Steichen.

== History ==
The Navy had established this special group in early 1942, shortly after the US entry into the war, to document and publicize its aviation activities and allowed Steichen to recruit the most talented photographers he could find. Steichen and his unit initially reported to Capt Arthur W. Radford, and were made part of the Navy's Bureau of Aeronautics.

Because Steichen wanted an unusual amount of control over the unit, outside the purview of the Navy's pre-existing photographic community, and because Radford agreed with him, it was decided the unit would operate out of the Bureau of Aeronautics' Training Literature Division, which was under Radford's direct command. This is why the unit's official name was "Training Literature Field Unit No. 1." However, informally it was referred to as the Naval Aviation Photographic Unit, and is generally referred to that way in the literature about it.

The main purpose Radford had for the unit was to promote the recruitment of pilots specifically for the Navy. Radford believed there was competition for a limited talent pool between the Navy and the Army Air Corps, and that attractive, top-rate photography in the press, posters, and leaflets would help the Navy reach its quota of 30,000 new pilots each year.

Wayne Miller, one of the unit's photographers, remembered Steichen's instructions this way: " 'I don't care what you do, Wayne, but bring back something that will please the brass a little bit, an aircraft carrier or somebody with all the braid; spend the rest of your time photographing the man.' It was Steichen's prime concern—don't photograph the war; photograph the man, the little guy; the struggle, the heartaches, plus the dreams of this guy. Photograph the sailor."

Radford was given command of Carrier Division 11 in July 1943. Rear Admiral John S. McCain, Sr. was made head of the Bureau of Aeronautics, and thus Steichen's commander. McCain was pleased by the results Steichen and his photographers were getting, and supported them fully, including seeing Steichen promoted to full Commander. McCain also had Steichen do portraits of senior Navy officers, in the Vanity Fair style for which Steichen was known, to smooth relations for the unit among differing commands. McCain's own portrait is shown below in the gallery.

Steichen's responsibility increased to the point where, in early 1945, he was made director of a newly formed Naval Photographic Institute, and given formal control over all Navy combat photography.

The unit was largely demobilized after the end of the war in August 1945. As those servicemen with the most time overseas received priority in demobilization, almost all of the unit were home by Thanksgiving.

== Members ==
The group of photographers Steichen originally chose for the unit were:

Naval Aviation Photographic Unit
Rank	Name	Image	Notes & Refs.
Lt	Wayne Miller		
Lt	Dwight Long		(who specialized in movies, not photography as such)
Lt	Charles E. Kerlee		
Lt	Charles Fenno Jacobs		
Lt Cdr	Horace Bristol		
En	Victor Jorgensen		
En	Alfonso ("Fons") Iannelli		

Steichen wanted Ansel Adams to be part of the unit, to build and direct a state-of-the-art darkroom and laboratory in Washington, D.C. In approximately February 1942, Steichen asked Adams to join. Adams agreed, with two conditions: He wanted to be commissioned as an officer, and he also told Steichen he would not be available until July 1. Steichen, who wanted the team assembled as quickly as possible, passed Adams by, and had his other photographers ready to go by early April. Among the photographers whom Steichen later added in early 1945 was Morley Baer who remained with the unit until the end of the war.

== Works ==
The photographs the unit produced were used as the basis for at least two contemporary books:

- Power In the Pacific – compiled by Steichen to accompany an exhibition by the same title at the Museum of Modern Art
- The Blue Ghost – a record of Steichen's November 1943 tour on board the USS Lexington (CV-16).
- Steichen at War -- (1981, Harry N Abrams Publishing) Over 200 beautiful images in 300-line duotone

== Gallery ==
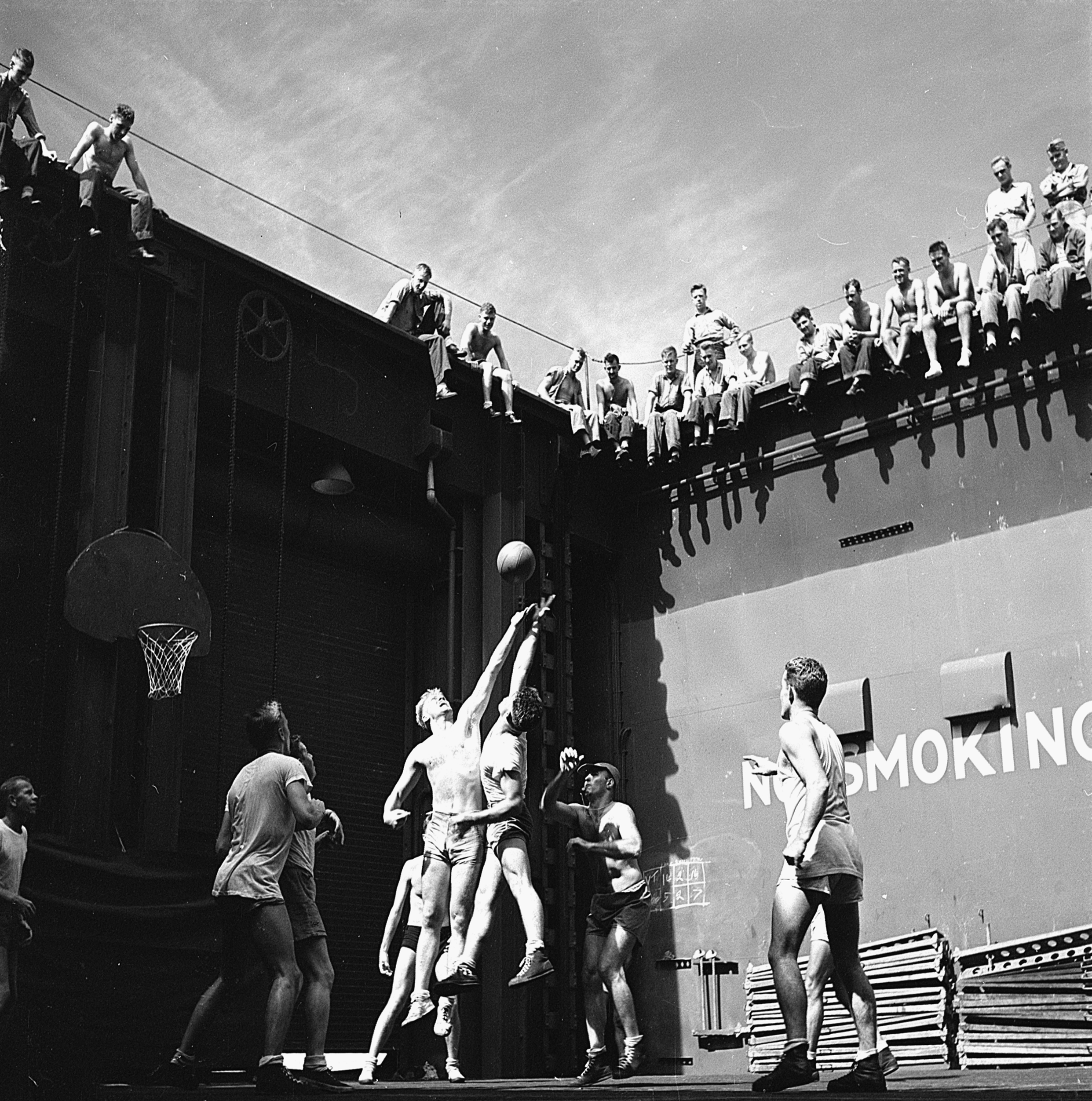
Gerald Ford is the jumper on the left of this 1944 photograph on board USS Monterey by Victor Jorgensen

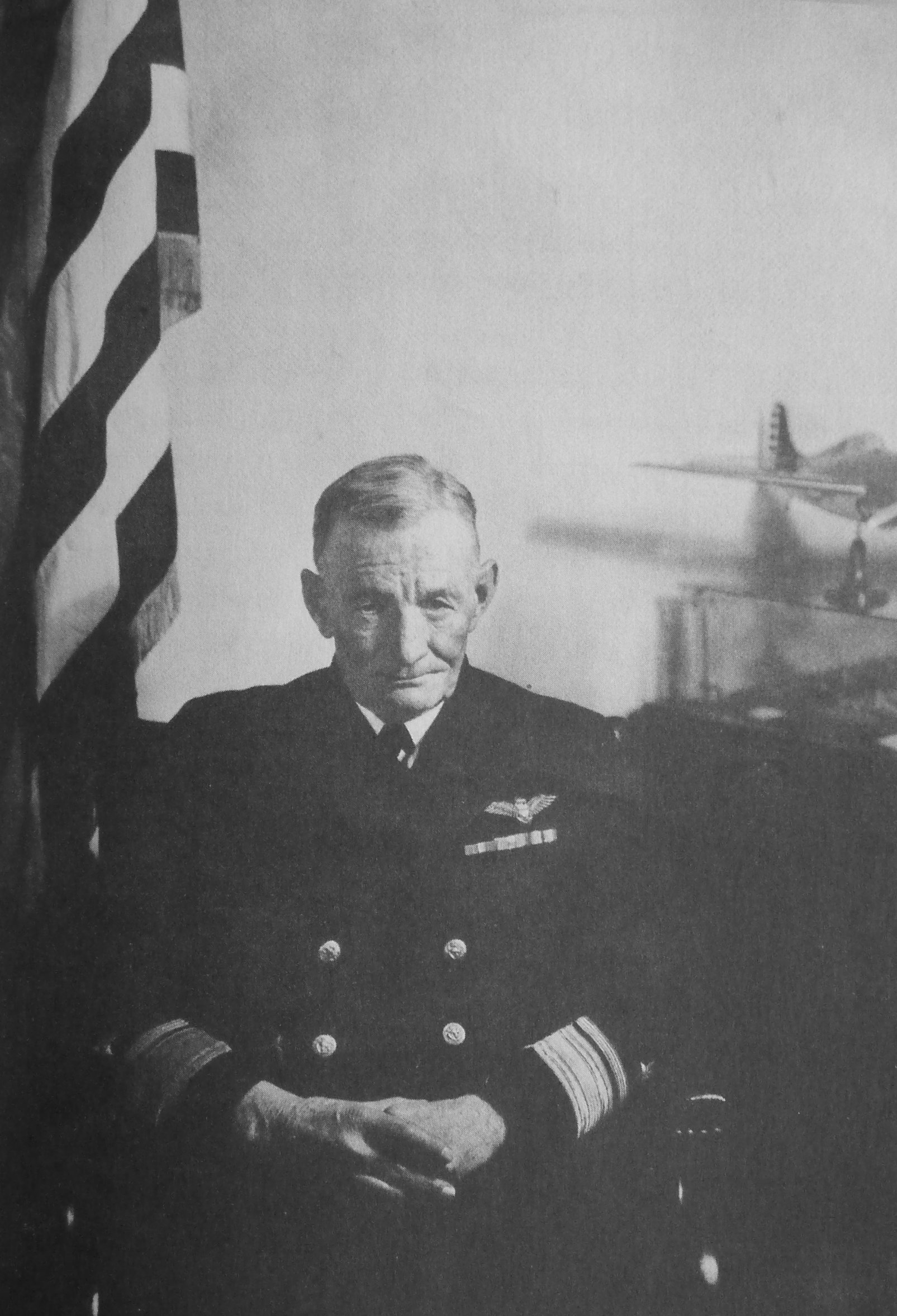
A portrait of RAdm John S. McCain, Sr., by Steichen, from 1943

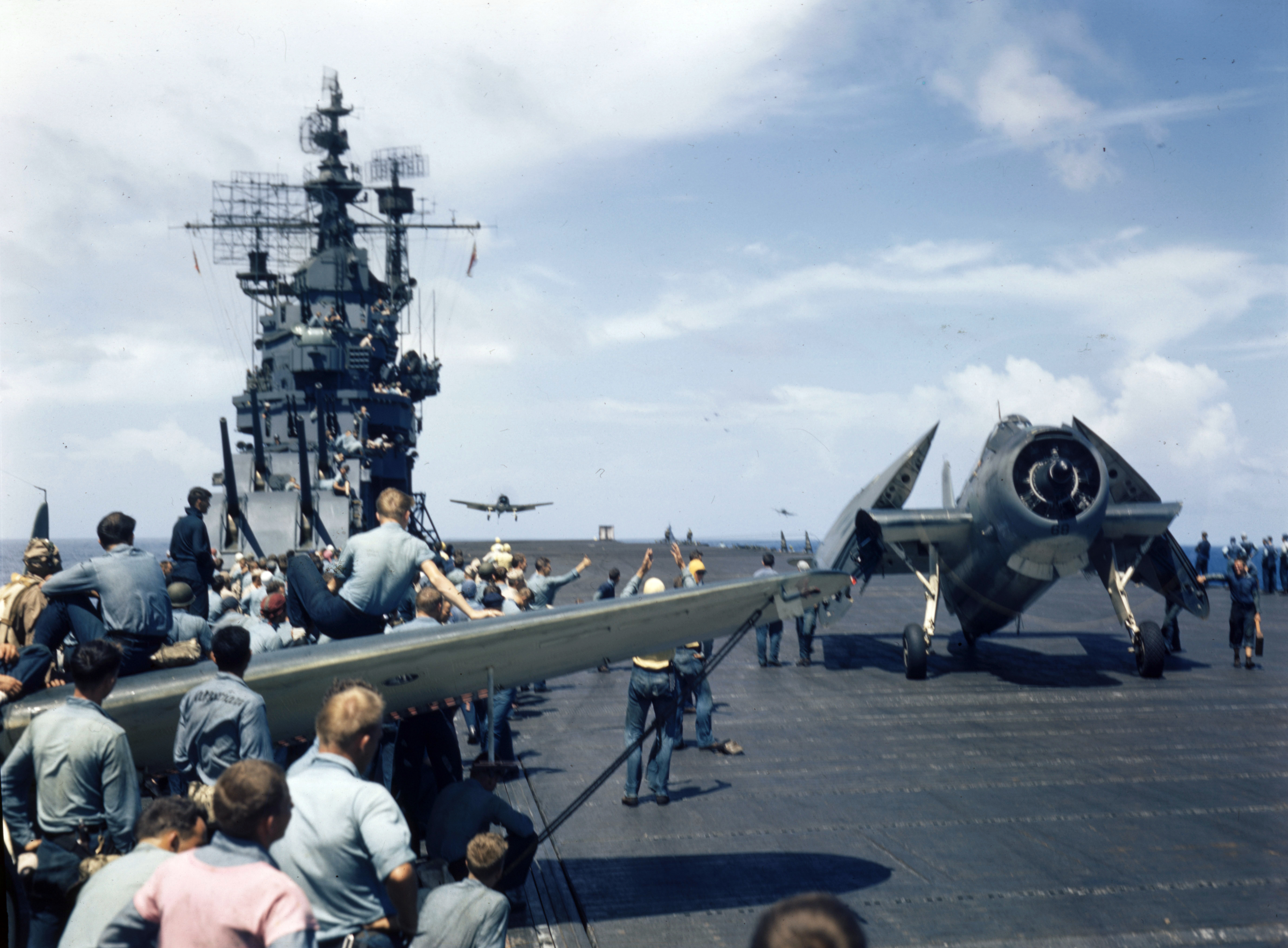
"Aircraft of Carrier Air Group 16 return to the USS Lexington (CV-16) during the Gilberts operation, November 1943." Photographed by Commander Edward Steichen, USNR.

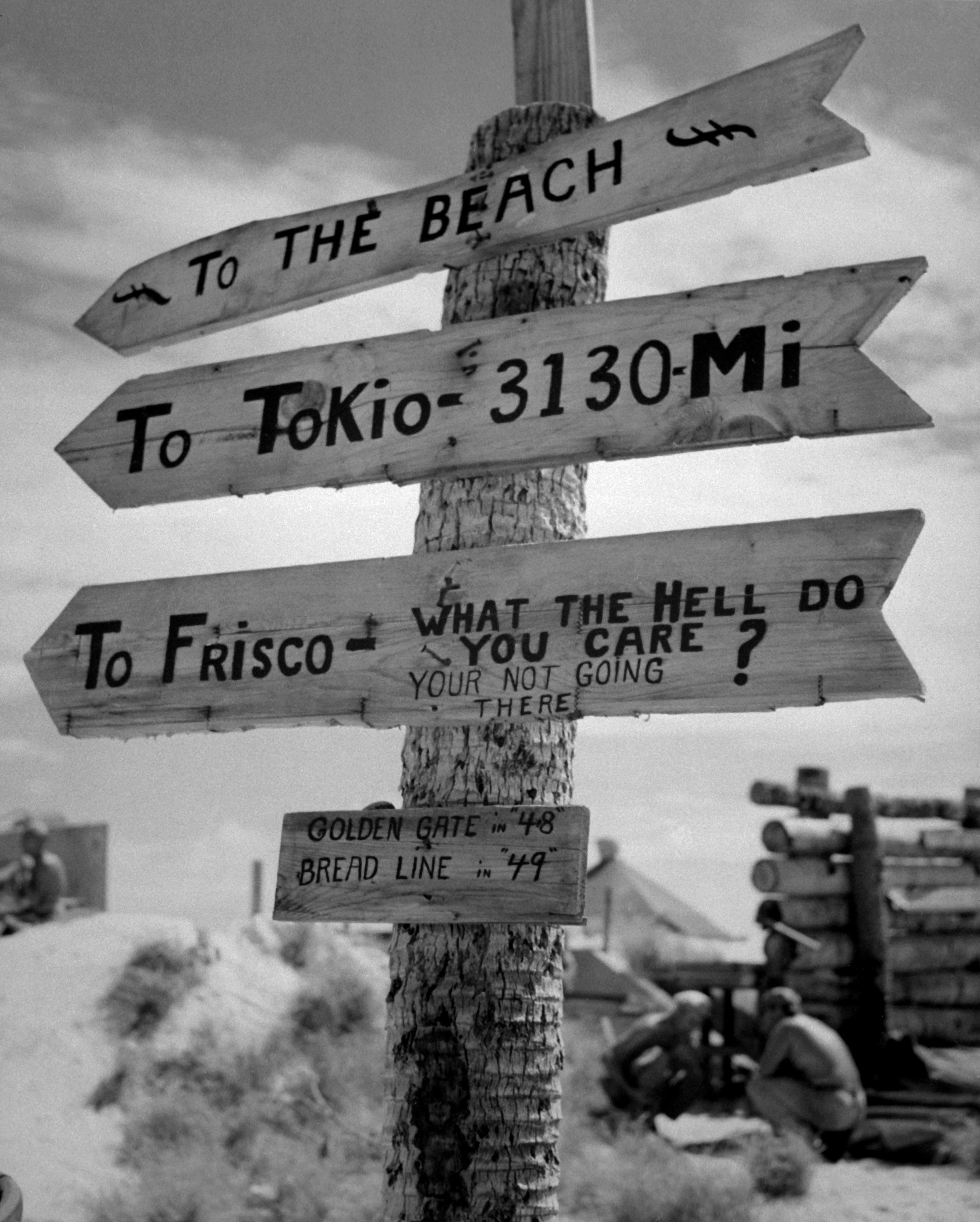
Humorous sign put up by the troops, photographed by Charles Fenno Jacobs on Tarawa.

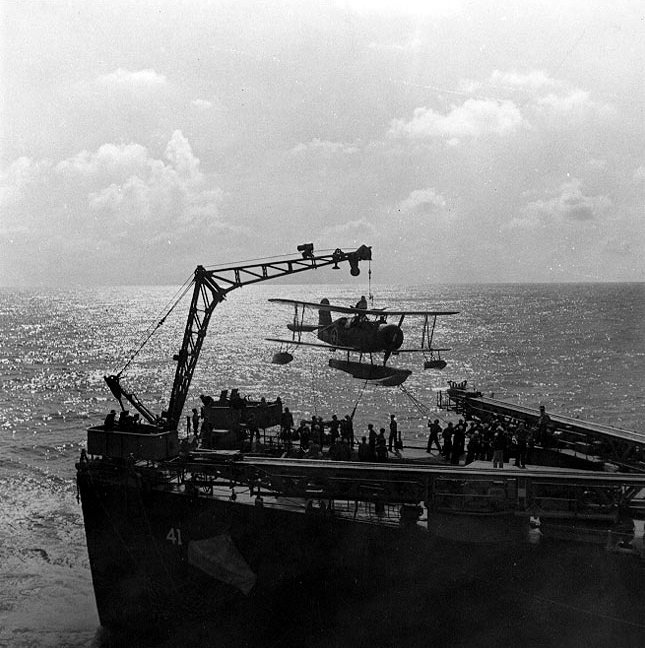
Photo by Horace Bristol of a Curtiss SOC scoutplane being hoisted on board the USS Philadelphia.

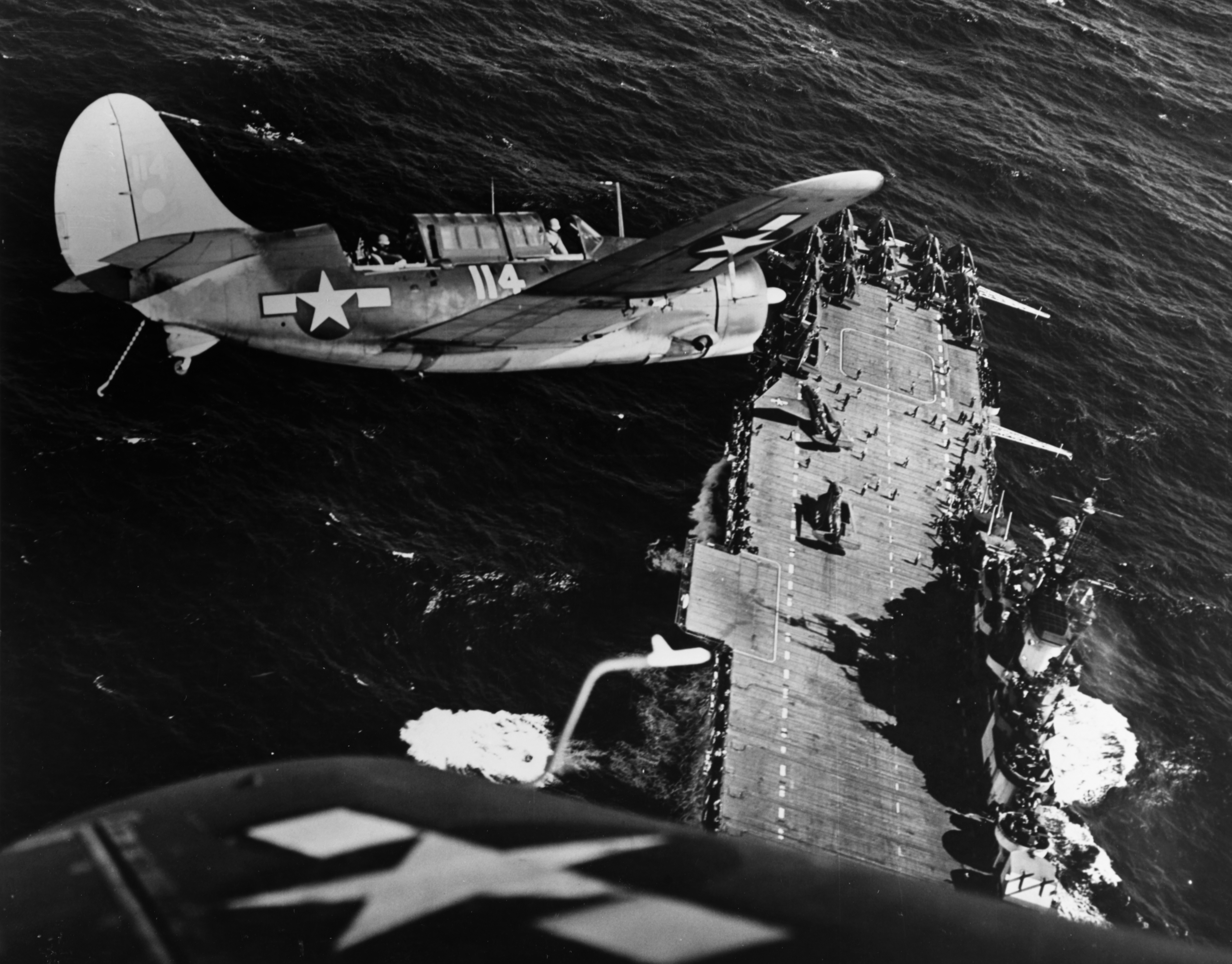
Two Curtiss SB2C-3 "Helldiver" aircraft bank over the USS Hornet in 1945, in a photo by Lt Cmdr Charles Kerlee

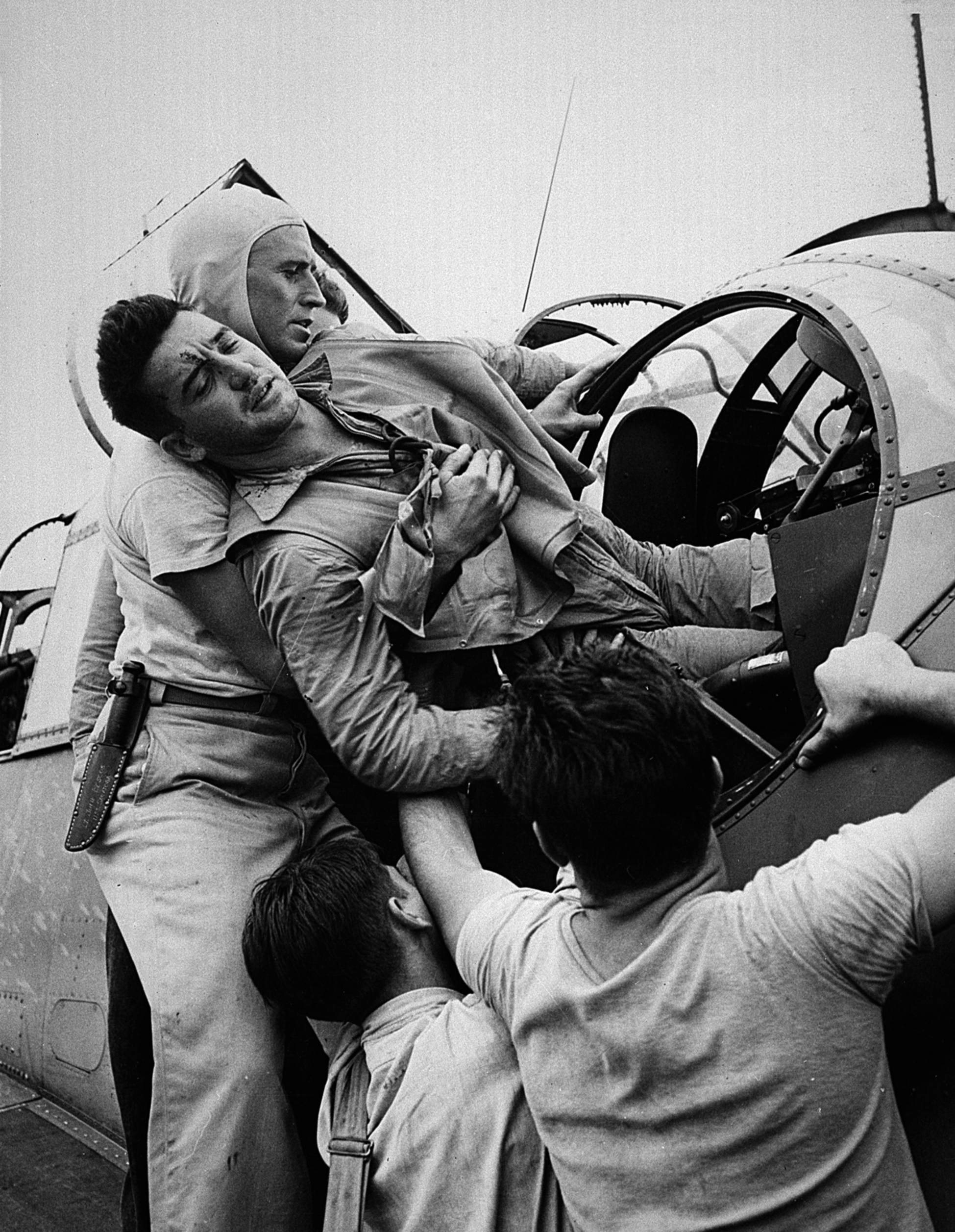
Crewmen aboard USS Saratoga lift a wounded aviator out of a Grumman TBF Avenger's rear turret. Photo by Lt Wayne Miller.
