= Victor Jorgensen =

American photographer

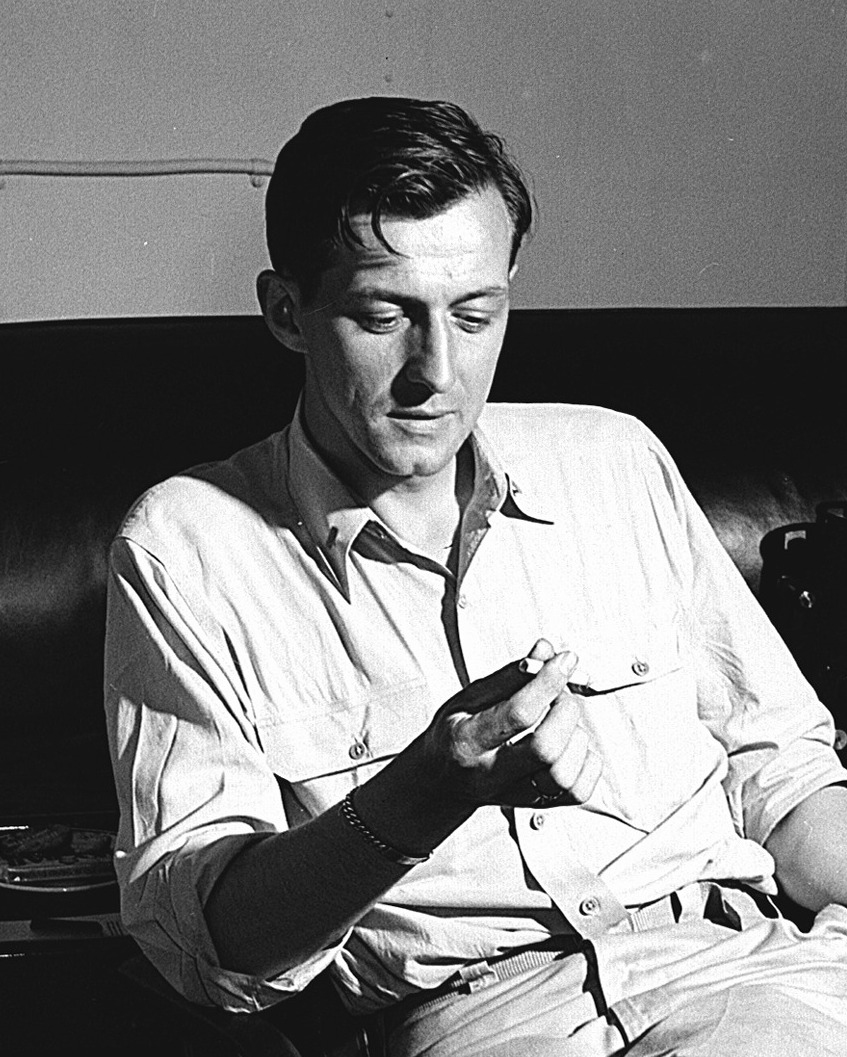
- Lt. Victor Jorgensen relaxing in his quarters aboard the USS Lexington, ca. 1943
- Born: Victor Hugo Jorgensen; July 8, 1913; Portland, Oregon
- Died: June 14, 1994 (aged 80); West Linn, Oregon
- Occupation: photo journalist
- Known for: taking photograph of nurse Greta Zimmer Friedman being kissed by Navy Sailor George Mendonsa on August 14, 1945 published in The New York Times

Victor Jorgensen (July 8, 1913 – June 14, 1994) was a former Navy photo journalist who probably is most notable for taking an instantly iconic photograph of an impromptu scene in Manhattan on August 14, 1945, but from a different angle and in a less dramatic exposure than that of a photograph taken by Alfred Eisenstaedt. Both photographs were of the same V-J Day embrace of a woman in a white dress by a sailor. Eisenstaedt's better known photograph, V-J Day in Times Square, was published in Life.

On the day after the images were taken by the two photographers, the one taken by Jorgensen was published in The New York Times. His photograph, which was taken while he was on duty, is retained in the National Archives and Records Administration.

== Biography ==
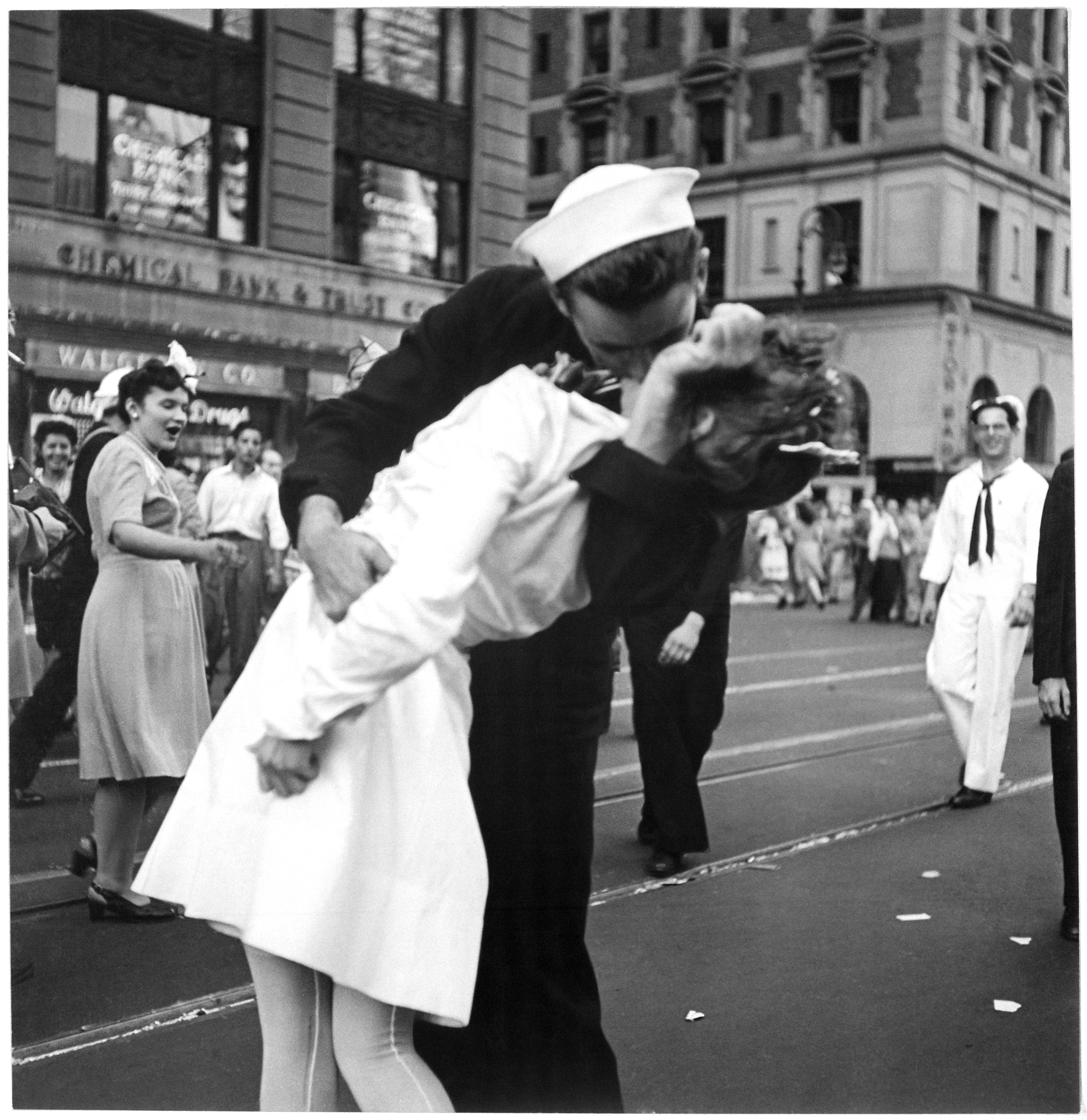
Jorgensen's Navy photograph of the V-J Day kiss in Times Square

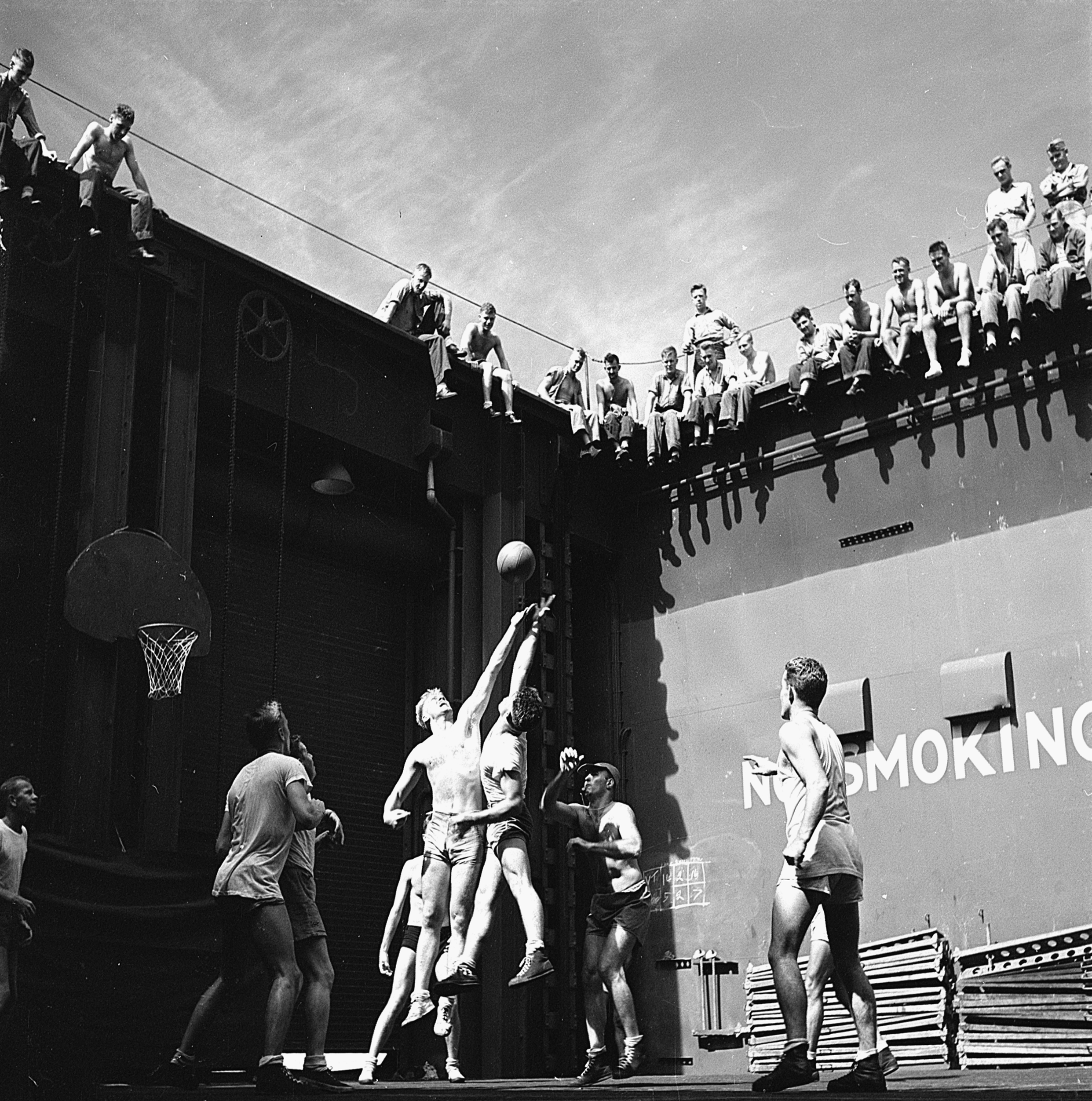
Future president Gerald Ford is the jumper on the left of this 1943 photograph by Jorgensen

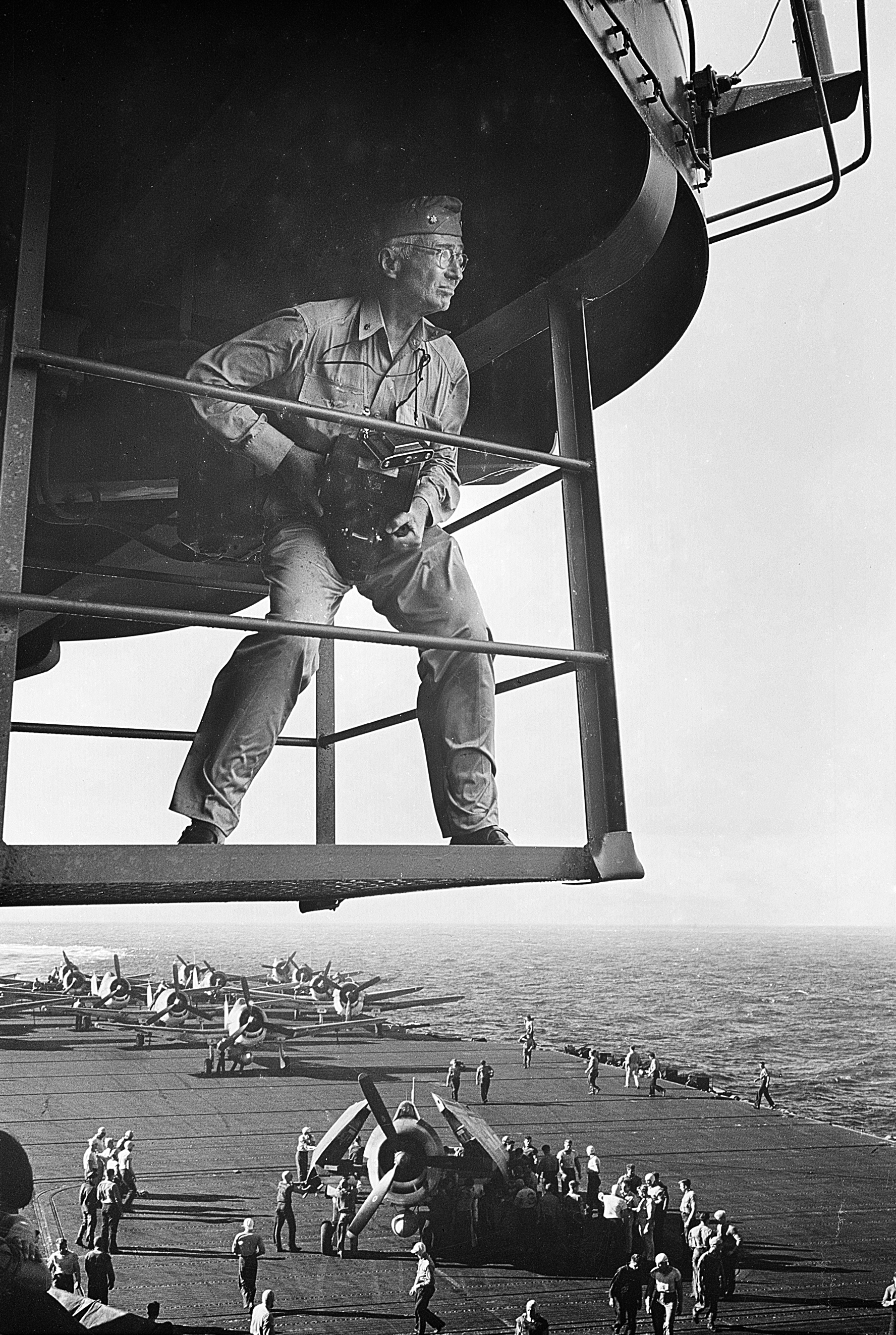
CDR Edward Steichen photographed above the deck of the aircraft carrier USS Lexington by Jorgensen, November 1943.

Jorgensen was born in Portland, Oregon. He attended the University of Oregon and Reed College, graduating in 1936. He married Betty Price on June 17, 1935.

After college, he joined the staff of The Oregonian, working his way up from copy boy to night city editor. During his time at the newspaper, he became interested in photography and by the advent of World War II he was becoming a respected photographer.

In 1942, Jorgensen enlisted in the Navy and was one of six initial photographers recruited by Edward Steichen to join the Naval Aviation Photographic Unit during the war. He served aboard aircraft carriers USS Lexington in the Gilbert Islands (fall 1943); the USS Monterey in the Mariana Islands (1944); destroyer USS Albert W. Grant and shore duty in Borneo and the Philippines during Douglas MacArthur's return in 1944; and the hospital ship USS Solace off Okinawa, spring 1945.

While aboard the USS Monterey, he captured Navy pilots in the forward elevator well of the ship playing basketball during June 1944. One of the subjects, the jumper of the left, is Gerald Ford, who later became the president of the United States upon the resignation of Richard Nixon.

On V-J Day, 1945, both Jorgensen and Eisenstaedt captured the image of a U.S. sailor grabbing a nurse for an impromptu kiss in the midst of Times Square celebrations. In a 2010 article, The New York Times described it as "a defining image of the American century, one that expressed the joy of a nation at its moment of greatest triumph."

In the post-war decade, Jorgensen and his wife traveled the world as a photographer researcher team, contributing to magazines including Fortune, Saturday Evening Post, Collier's, Life, and Ladies Home Journal. Jorgensen served as president of the American Society of Media Photographers, working to establish minimum pay scales and fair practices for the photography industry.

== Later life ==
After he left the Navy, Jorgensen settled in Maryland. He took over Chesapeake Skipper magazine, renaming it The Skipper and boosted its subscriptions from 1,500 to 50,000 by 1968. He and his wife moved to Portland at that time and started a boaters' consumer report newsletter. Jorgensen died of cancer in 1994 and was survived by his wife; two daughters; and two sisters.
