= Horace Bristol =

American photographer (1908–1997)

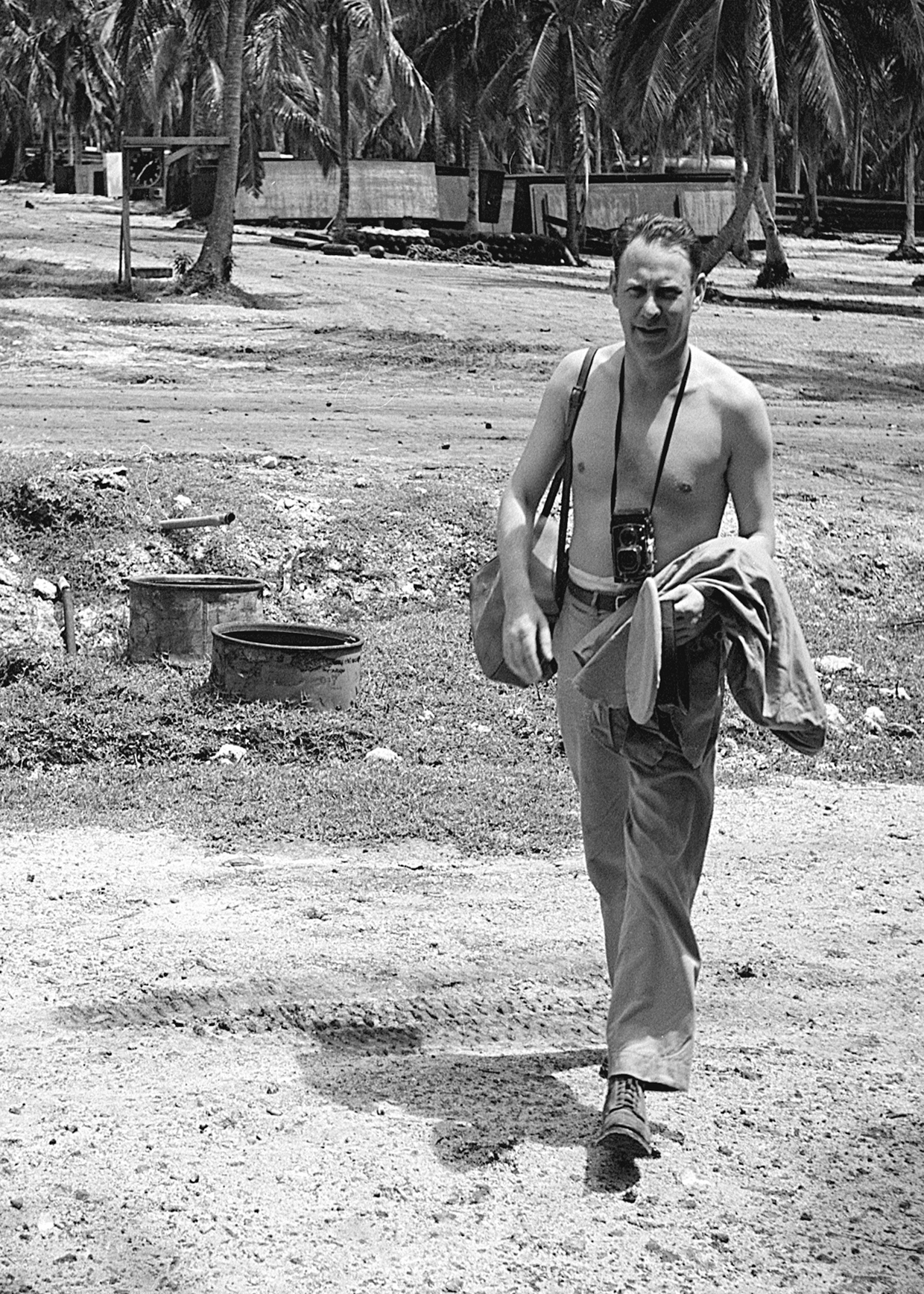
- Bristol in 1944
- Born: November 16, 1908; Whittier, California
- Died: August 4, 1997 (aged 88); Ojai, California
- Citizenship: American
- Education: Art Center College of Design
- Occupation: Photographer
- Years active: 1936–1956
- Spouse(s): Mary O'Donnell Hulme (died 1956); Masako Bristol
- Children: 2

Horace Bristol (November 16, 1908 – August 4, 1997) was a twentieth-century American photographer, best known for his work in Life. His photos appeared in Time, Fortune, Sunset, and National Geographic magazines.

== Early life ==
Bristol was born and raised in Whittier, California, he was the son of Edith Bristol, women's editor at the San Francisco Call. Bristol attended the Art Center of Los Angeles, originally majoring in architecture. In 1933, he moved to San Francisco to work in commercial photography, and met Ansel Adams, who lived near his studio. Through his friendship with Adams, he met Edward Weston, Imogen Cunningham, and other artists. He was copy reader at night for the Los Angeles Times after graduating from Belmont High School.

== Photography career ==
In 1936, Bristol became a part of Life's founding photographers, and in 1938, began to document migrant farmers in California's central valley with John Steinbeck, recording the Great Depression, photographs that would later be called the Grapes of Wrath collection.

In 1941, Bristol was recruited to the U.S. Naval Aviation Photographic Unit, as one of six photographers under the command of Captain Edward J. Steichen, documenting World War II in places such as South Africa, and Japan. Bristol helped to document the invasions of North Africa, Iwo Jima, and Okinawa.

== Later life ==
Following his documentation of World War II, Bristol settled in Tokyo, Japan, selling his photographs to magazines in Europe and the United States, and becoming the Asian correspondent to Fortune. He published several books, and established the East-West Photo Agency.

Following the death of his wife in 1956, Bristol burned all his negatives, packed his photographs into storage, and retired from photography. He went on to remarry, and have two children. He returned to the United States, and after 30 years, recovered the photographs from storage, to share with his family. Subsequently he approached his alma mater, Art Center College of Design, where the World War II and migrant worker photographs became the subject of a 1989 solo exhibition. The migrant worker photos would go on to be part of the J. Paul Getty Museum's Grapes of Wrath series.

== Death and legacy ==
Bristol lived in Ojai, California, until his death in 1997 at the age of 89.

Bristol's work is displayed around the world, including the Getty Museum and the Los Angeles County Museum of Art. In 2006, a documentary was made, The Compassionate Eye: Horace Bristol, Photojournalist, written and directed by David Rabinovitch.

== Bibliography ==
- Ken Conner and Debra Heimerdinger. Horace Bristol: An American View. ISBN 0-8118-1261-8
