= Martin Johnson =

Martin Johnson may refer to:

- Martin Johnson (rugby union) (born 1970), English rugby union footballer and manager
- One half of Martin and Osa Johnson (1884–1937), a husband-and-wife adventurer/explorer/filmmaker team from Kansas
- Martin Johnson (musician) (born 1985), lead singer of Boys Like Girls
- Martin Johnson (racing driver) (born 1963), British auto racing driver
- Martin Hume Johnson (born 1944), Emeritus Professor of Reproductive Sciences at the University of Cambridge.
- Martin Michael Johnson (1899–1975), Roman Catholic Bishop of Nelson, British Columbia, then Archbishop of Vancouver 1964–1969
- Martin N. Johnson (1850–1909), U.S. Senator from North Dakota
- Martin W. Johnson (1893–1984), U.S. oceanographer
- Marty P. Johnson, CEO of Isles, Inc. in Trenton, NJ
- Martin Johnson (Hollyoaks), a fictional character from British soap opera Hollyoaks
- Martin Johnson (MP), Member of Parliament for Woodstock
- Martin Johnson (writer), English writer on cricket and other sports
- Martin Johnson (footballer) (1906–1977), English footballer

== See also ==
- Martin Johnston (1947–1990), Australian poet and novelist
- Marty Johnstone (1951–1979), drug dealer
