= Unconditional Surrender (sculpture) =

Statue by Seward Johnson

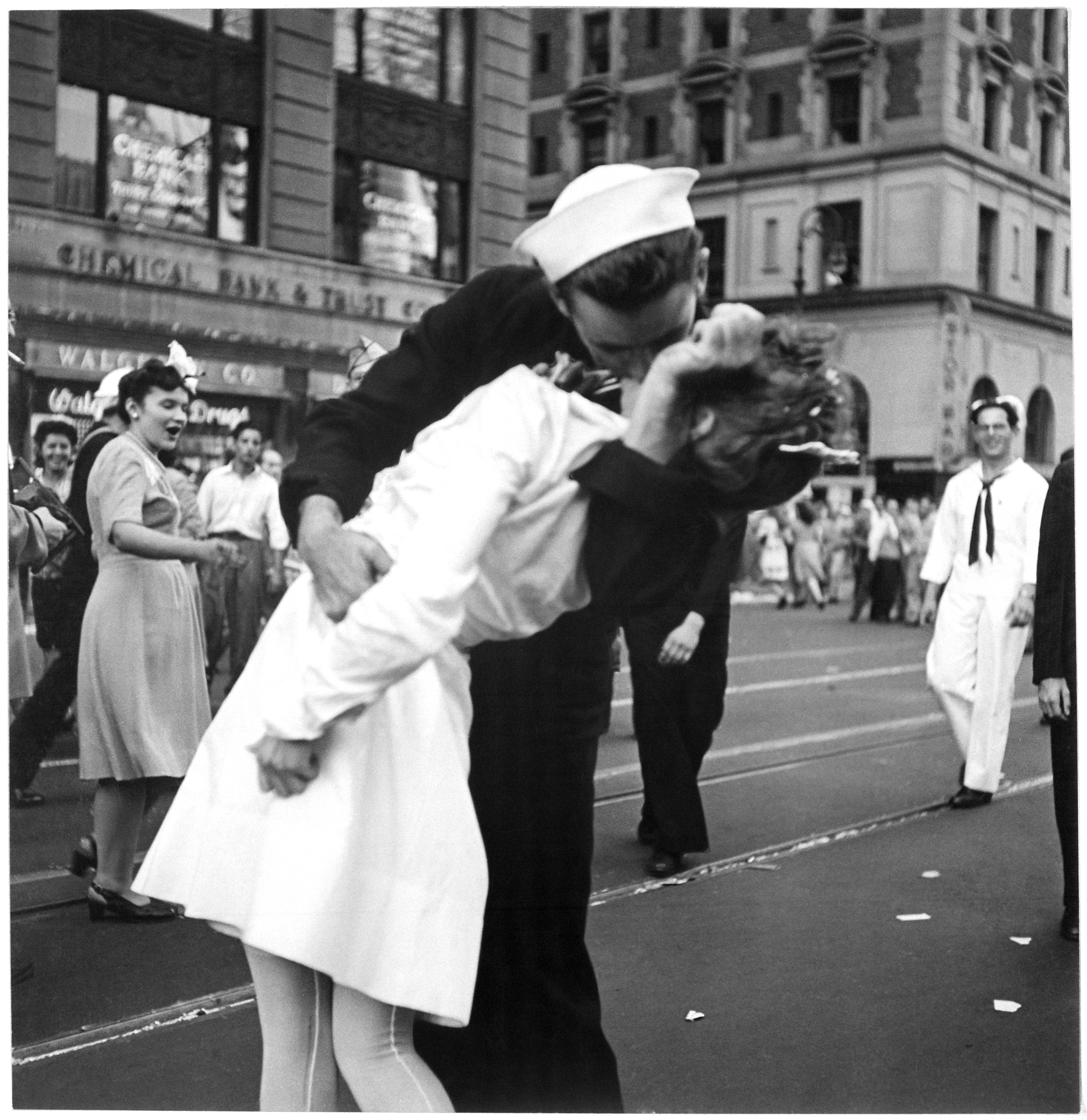
A copyright-free Victor Jorgensen photograph, held in government archives and cited by Seward Johnson as the source for Unconditional Surrender, only extends to just below the knees of the subjects, failing to show the unusual stance of the woman—that is shown fully in the iconic Alfred Eisenstaedt photograph—and that nonetheless, appears in the statues

Unconditional Surrender is a series of computer-generated statues by Seward Johnson that resemble an iconic 1945 photograph by Alfred Eisenstaedt, V–J day in Times Square. However, they were said by Johnson to be based on a similar, lesser-known, photograph by Victor Jorgensen that is in the public domain. The first in the series was installed temporarily in Sarasota, Florida, then was moved to San Diego, California, and New York City. Other copies have been installed in Hamilton, New Jersey; Pearl Harbor, Hawaii; and Normandy, France. Johnson later identified the statue at exhibitions as "Embracing Peace" for the risqué double entendre when spoken.

== 2005: First temporary installation in Sarasota ==
Seward Johnson manufactured a life-size bronze precursor to the huge statues of Unconditional Surrender using a computer copying technology that would be used for the entire series. A 25-feet-tall (7.6 m) styrofoam version of the statue was part of a temporary exhibition in Sarasota, Florida, in 2005, at its bay front. The technology he used copies two-dimensional images in order to manufacture three-dimensional objects.

Johnson proceeded with the manufacture of aluminum versions of the 25-feet-tall statue, marketing them through a foundation he had created. He offered copies ranging from $542,500 for styrofoam (plastic), $980,000 for aluminum, and $1,140,000 for bronze. Johnson established the Sculpture Foundation to disseminate his work.

== 2007: Temporary installation in San Diego encounters controversy ==
After being exhibited in Florida, the plastic copy of the statue was moved to San Diego, California, on a flatbed truck. That copy is entitled Embracing Peace where the Port of San Diego installed it in Tuna Harbor Park temporarily in 2007. The statue, made of a foam core with a urethane outer layer, was scheduled to be on loan through August 2010, but after a May 2012 restoration it became permanent.

Placement of the statue was criticized by multiple people. Robert L. Pincus, art critic of The San Diego Union Tribune, said that according to "theme-park logic" the statue suited the site, in front of the Midway Aircraft Museum, and that it pleased couples who mimicked the pose, but that it was kitsch and "The figures look like something from a cheap souvenir factory, blown up beyond any reason." Other critics stated that the statue "was not artistically or [a]esthetically pleasing."

== 2009: Aluminum copy to Sarasota temporarily amid controversy ==
Interest in a revisit to Sarasota in 2009 was cultivated by a director of a bay-front biannual show and an aluminum copy was placed at the bay front, again temporarily. An "88-year-old donor, who served in the U.S. Navy during World War II" offered to pay half a million dollars for it against an initial asking price of $680,000.

While some members of the community supported the statue, others felt the statue was not good enough to be displayed on the bay front. The chairwoman of the public art committee at the time said that "it doesn't even qualify as kitsch...It is like a giant cartoon image drafted by a computer emulating a famous photograph. It's not the creation of an artist. It's an artist copying a famous image." The statue was immediately controversial, with some people calling for its removal for various reasons, including the fact that it may constitute copyright infringement, as well as concern about its content representing a sexual assault.

Joel May, a Sarasota architect and a member of the city public art committee, raised an issue of possible copyright infringement, because of the similarity of the statue to V–J day in Times Square, published in Life in 1945 and still protected by copyright. Johnson asserted that he was aware of this issue, and had used another photograph of the kissing couple taken by Victor Jorgensen, which is in the public domain. The attorney for the municipal government said that the attorneys for Johnson and the donor had fulfilled the requirements set by the city commission, making way for exhibition of the statue for at least ten years.

An automobile crash occurred on April 26, 2012, during which the Sarasota copy of the statue was struck by a vehicle and was damaged. Usually the statue attracts visitors who gather around the base and often back up to the curb to take photographs, but no one was present when the automobile jumped the curb and careened into the statue. The impact knocked an approximately 3-feet-wide hole in the sailor's foot and added hairline cracks to its frame. This led to the statue being taken down by the city, which laid the statue onto its side, close to the site, while insurance companies negotiated over liability and repair issues. The minimum distance for a road hazard established by the state of Florida is fourteen feet, but the location barely met that standard and it was erected near one of the busiest and most complex intersections in the city, the intersection of Tamiami Trail (U.S. 41), and the state route that must be taken for all traffic across Sarasota Bay to and from barrier islands and beaches situated between the mainland and the Gulf of Mexico.

Debate about returning the statue to that location ensued, with an editorial calling for moving the statue to a safer location, as had been advocated by critics before the statue was placed for the controversial ten-year display. The statue was re-erected in the same location, however, in December 2012.

=== Accepted into public art collection ===
The city commission voted to accept the statue into the city public art collection at the end of the ten-year temporary display agreement even though the controversies remained as issues in the community. The statue soon had to be moved for major road construction that would take a couple of years. This renewed public debates. A decision was made to make a new permanent location for it in another location on the bay front instead of having to move it twice. At public meetings, city commissioners agreed that a second interpretive sign could be allowed to address the controversies.

In 2021, a proposal to place a second interpretive sign addressing the controversies was presented to the city commission at a public meeting in Sarasota on December 6. The proposed sign would be donated by Friends of Seagate and would be designed and drafted through a joint effort by the organization, city staff overseeing public art, and the public arts committee, as well as, having to meet the approval of the city commission. The sign would accompany the existing interpretive sign for the statue that had been designed to resemble historical markers and was placed solely by the donor who offered the statue to the city, and it stood for the ten years of the display. Historical errors are present in the first interpretive sign that could be corrected in a second sign along with discussion of the controversial issues. After taking a large amount of public comment and following discussion among the commissioners, a closely divided vote of three-to-two resulted in dismissal of the proposal without consensus.

Shortly thereafter, a web site entitled, Project Delta Dawn, was created by Kelly Franklin, a city resident who has advocated for return of the statue to the Johnson estate, or, if it were to remain on public property, that signage accurately disclosing the nature of the non-consensual act it depicts be added in order to promote conversation and discourage emulation. Her site provides a history of the original photograph, the copyright controversy, documentation of the subjects and their comments, how the statue was manufactured—rather than being the original art required by the city standards—and the number of other copies, public sentiments about the statue, and details about the proposal for an interpretive sign to address contemporary cultural attitudes regarding the non-consensual nature now known about the event captured in the famous photograph.

=== Controversy led to tagging as sexual assault ===
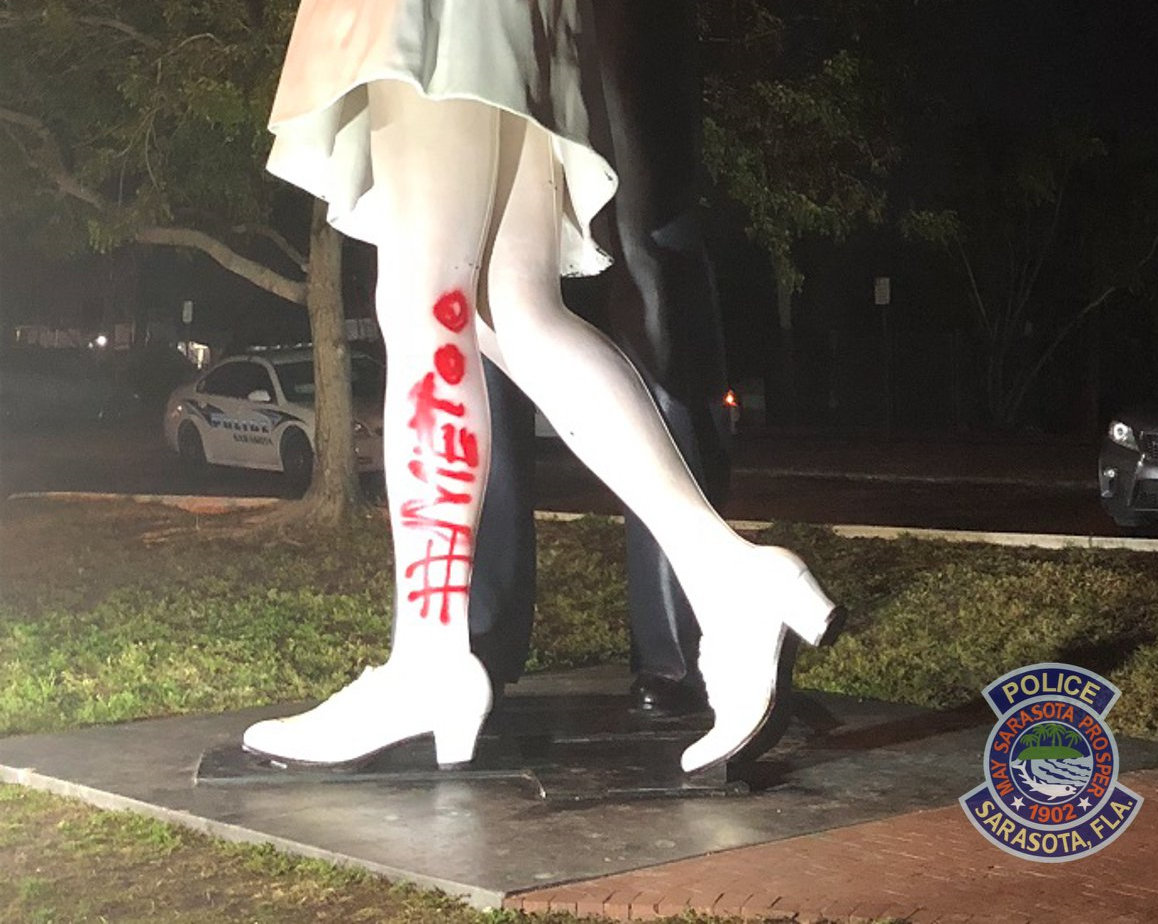
#metoo tag on the Unconditional Surrender statue in Sarasota, Florida

Unconditional Surrender has been a topic of controversy many times, both pro and con, but in 2019, after George Mendonsa, the man thought to be the subject of the original photograph V-J Day in Times Square died and media coverage that followed made it better known that the woman thought to be the other subject was not known to the sailor depicted and had related that it was not consensual, controversy over the statue gained new momentum with more accusations that it depicts a sexual assault. The day after his death, the statue in Sarasota was vandalised with #MeToo graffiti. A tweet from the police department stated late one evening that they had dispatched officers to the statue in response to a report that "Unconditional Surrender" had been vandalized. When officers arrived, they saw the large words, "#MeToo", painted in red on the left leg of the woman. The police noted later that they were uncertain of the time of the tagging because no surveillance cameras captured the activity and there were no reports of witnesses.

== 2010: Hamilton, New Jersey ==
A 25-feet-tall styrofoam copy of Unconditional Surrender, built in 2005 and on loan from the Seward Johnson Atelier was installed at the 42-acre Grounds For Sculpture (GFS) that Johnson founded in Hamilton, New Jersey, as part of a retrospective honoring him that ran from May 4, 2014, through July 1, 2015. Writing up this event, a staff writer for The Trentonian described Unconditional Surrender as a "masterpiece".

== 2011: Pearl Harbor ==
In August 2011, a life-size copy of the statue was unveiled in Waikiki, Hawaii, and later taken to the USS Missouri in Pearl Harbor, where it was to stay to commemorate the 66th anniversary of the end of World War II.

== 2012: Civitavecchia, Italy ==
In 2012, a monumental statue of Unconditional Surrender could be seen in Civitavecchia Marina.

== 2013: San Diego re-installation ==
Although controversy regarding a temporary display since 2007 of a version of the statue was occurring, in March 2012 the San Diego Unified Port District voted to purchase a permanent bronze replacement for the loaner. This controversial move resulted in the resignation of three board members. Despite the controversy, construction of the new weather-resistant bronze statue proceeded, in part due to a fundraising campaign by the Midway Museum that raised US$1 million. The bronze replacement Unconditional Surrender statue arrived at its new home on February 11, 2013. The replacement was bolted into place near the location of the previous copy of the statue that had been installed as a loaner in 2007.

== 2014: Caen, France controversy ==
In September 2014, the copy of the statue in Civitavecchia, Italy, was removed and installed at the Caen Memorial in Normandy. In Civitavecchia, controversy arose with hundreds of demonstrators protesting against the dismantling.

It was precisely this installation in Caen that generated a converse controversy, of objection to its display. In October 2014, French feminist group Osez le féminisme ! petitioned to have the statue removed and sent back to the United States, stating, "the sailor could have laughed with these women, embraced them, asked if he could kiss them with joy. No, he chose to grab them, with clenched fists, to kiss them. It was an assault." Following this incident, the Caen memorial placed a plaque under the statue to explain the identity of the woman and information known about the scene depicted.

== 2015: New York City temporary exhibition ==
On August 12, 2015, the first copy of the statue was temporarily installed in Times Square, New York City, near where the original photograph was taken. It was to be displayed through August 16 for a "Times Square Kiss-In" event. Johnson dubbed it "Embracing Peace" at this event, using a risqué double entendre when spoken.

== Other locations that have displayed copies ==
A copy of Unconditional Surrender on display in Manhattan in 2015

Copies of the statue can be found other parts of the world.

=== Civitavecchia (Rome), Italy ===
The popular Roman cruise terminal of Civitavecchia in Italy has one that is very tall and overlooks the sea. It is a short walk from the cruise ships to the station in order to take trains to Rome.

=== Royal Oak, Michigan ===
A copy of the statue arrived in Royal Oak, Michigan on June 18, 2016 and was installed in the city Memorial Park on June 20. The city manager expected that the statue would increase tourism and help raise money for the Michigan WWII Legacy Memorial, a permanent World War II memorial in the park. The statue was removed six months later, on December 20.

=== Key West, Florida ===
A copy of the statue was placed in Key West, Florida on January 10, 2017. it is located in downtown Key West, in the Mallory Square area. In front of the Custom House Museum and across from the Mel Fisher Museum.

=== Bastogne, Belgium ===
A copy of the statue was at the Mémorial du Mardasson, in Bastogne, Belgium. It was located outside the museum on the grounds between the museum and the pentastar Memorial. It has since been removed.

=== HMNB Portsmouth, United Kingdom ===
Erected in 2018. Outside the Mary Rose Museum.

=== Omaha, Nebraska ===
April - November 2023

== See also ==
- List of public art in San Diego
