= Isles, Inc. =

Nonprofit organization in New Jersey, US

Isles, Inc. is a self-help, urban green development organization in Trenton, New Jersey, founded in 1981. The Founder, President and CEO is Marty P. Johnson.

== Community served ==
Despite Trenton being New Jersey's capital city, Trenton's median household income is $35,259 – more than 50 percent below the median income for Mercer County, New Jersey. According to the New Jersey Department of Labor and Workforce Development data for the month of April 2012, Trenton reported an unemployment rate of 12%, which is significantly higher than the statewide rate of 9.1%. In 2010, the city's poverty rate was 29.2%, with an additional 3,000 Trenton residents falling into poverty last year.

== Recent initiatives and projects ==
Isles YouthBuild Institute: Isles YouthBuild Institute (IYI) offers alternative education options for at-risk urban students seeking a high school diploma or GED, vocational skills training (construction, computer technology, office management), and life skills training (leadership, financial, health education, conflict management). Isles has developed a peer-based approach for students ages 16 to 24, who have struggled in conventional school settings and/or have had encounters with the justice system. IYI students rehabilitate at least one abandoned home in Trenton each year.

Community Enterprises: Isles Community Enterprises (ICE), a certified Community Development Financial Institute (CDFI), offers educational and financial products in Spanish and English that support lower-income families pursuing long-term financial stability through homeownership and home preservation counseling, credit repair counseling, and other financial products.

Isles E4: Isles E4 (Energy, Environment, Employment, and Equity) is a weatherization and healthy homes subsidiary that works to deliver energy and health retrofits to low-income households in New Jersey. E4 offers job training for unemployed or underemployed residents and weatherization services for lower-income communities.

Center for Energy and Environmental Training (CEET): Isles' CEET is a green-collar job training facility targeting careers in clean energy and environmental hazard cleanup. Training modules include energy audits and retrofits, green construction, renewable energy, environmental assessment, and hazardous material cleanup. CEET is a Building Performance Institute (BPI) certified trainer, and an approved National Center for Healthy Housing satellite training center.

Community Planning and Development: Isles' Community Planning and Development department teaches residents how to organize, identify, and address immediate land, business, and service needs and opportunities through master planning projects in the region. Currently, Isles is working to renovate an 1800s mill that will become a multi-use center for community and culture in the Trenton area, not far from the well-known Grounds for Sculpture.

Urban Agriculture: Isles' Urban Agriculture work supports Trenton-area residents, schools, and other groups to transform vacant urban land into gardens. Through local and national support, such as the Rita Allen Foundation Grant to promote urban agriculture, Isles supports over 30 community and school gardens in the Trenton area.

Environmental Health: Isles' Environment Health Department targets the environmental hazards that impact family health and develops methods to reduce the presence and impact of those hazards. Education programs help families learn about lead and asthma triggers in homes, energy efficiency, and how to test for hazards and improve health and quality of life.
