= Lois Gibson =

American forensic artist

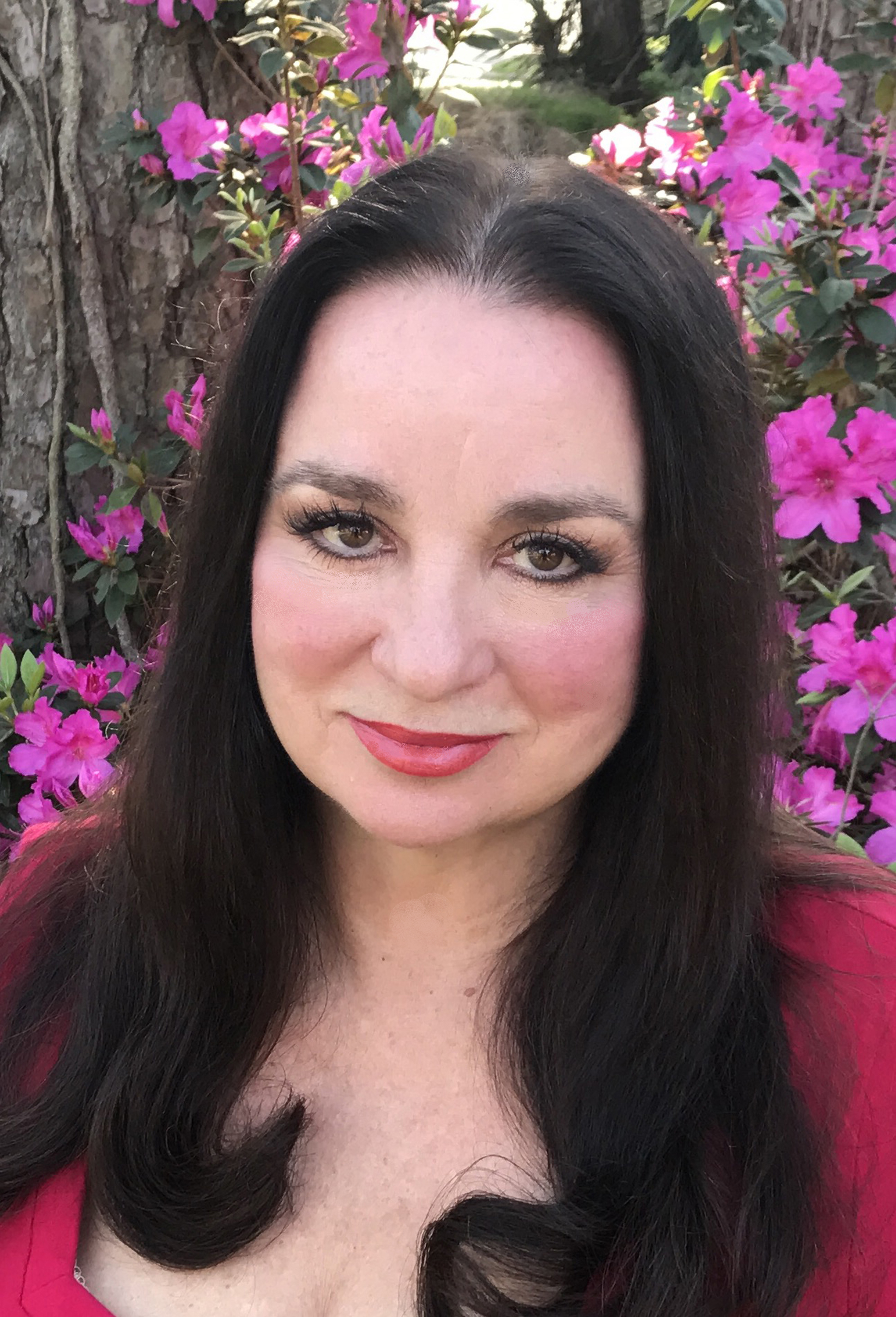
- Gibson in 2017
- Born: c. 1950
- Education: University of Texas at Austin (BFA)
- Occupation: Forensic artist
- Employer: Houston Police Department
- Children: 2

Lois Gibson (born c. 1950) is an American forensic artist who holds a 2017 Guinness World Record for most identifications by a forensic artist. She also drew the first forensic sketch shown on America's Most Wanted, which helped identify the suspect and solve the case.

== Early life ==
Gibson was born circa 1950. She earned a Bachelor of Fine Arts with Honors degree from the University of Texas at Austin.

== Career ==
Gibson decided to become a forensic artist after being assaulted and nearly killed when she was living in Los Angeles. She has taught at Northwestern University's Center for Public Safety since 1998. Gibson has worked as a forensic artist for the Houston Police Department since 1989, and as of 2012, it was reported that her work helped solve 1,266 crimes. Gibson has created fine art oil portraits for public buildings of Houston Mayor Bob Lanier, and San Antonio Mayors Jose Miguel de Arciniega, and Juan Seguin.

Gibson is the author of the true crime book Faces of Evil with writer Deanie Francis Mills, and wrote a textbook titled Forensic Art Essentials.

Gibson's work supported Glenn McDuffie's 2007 claim of being the man seen kissing the woman in Alfred Eisenstaedt's photo V-J Day in Times Square. Gibson's forensic analysis compared the Eisenstaedt photographs with current-day photographs of McDuffie, analyzing key facial features and measuring the ears, facial bones, hairline, wrist, knuckles, and hand in comparison to enlargements of Eisenstaedt's picture. According to Gibson, "I could tell just in general that yes, it's him, but I wanted to be able to tell other people so I replicated the pose".

In 2014, Gibson's work supported the claims of New Mexico educator Ray John DeAragon that Billy the Kid was the subject of a photo he inherited.

In 2017, Gibson's work supported the claims of Jesse James descendant Sandra Mills that a tintype photograph she owned showed James sitting next to Robert Ford.

Gibson appeared as herself on To Tell The Truth.

In 2018, Gibson worked with adult film star and director Stormy Daniels to create a composite sketch of a suspect that Daniels alleges threatened her in 2011 in a parking lot in Las Vegas to keep quiet about her affair with President Donald Trump.

In 2026, Gibson made national news with a composite sketch of the person suspected in the kidnapping of Nancy Guthrie drawn from the video image of a person in a balaclava mask on Guthrie's front porch after midnight.

== Personal life ==
Gibson is married and has two children, among which one is Christian Gibson, global head of Energy Investment Banking at Stifel Financial Corp.
