= Greta Zimmer Friedman =

Austrian-born American woman in classic photo

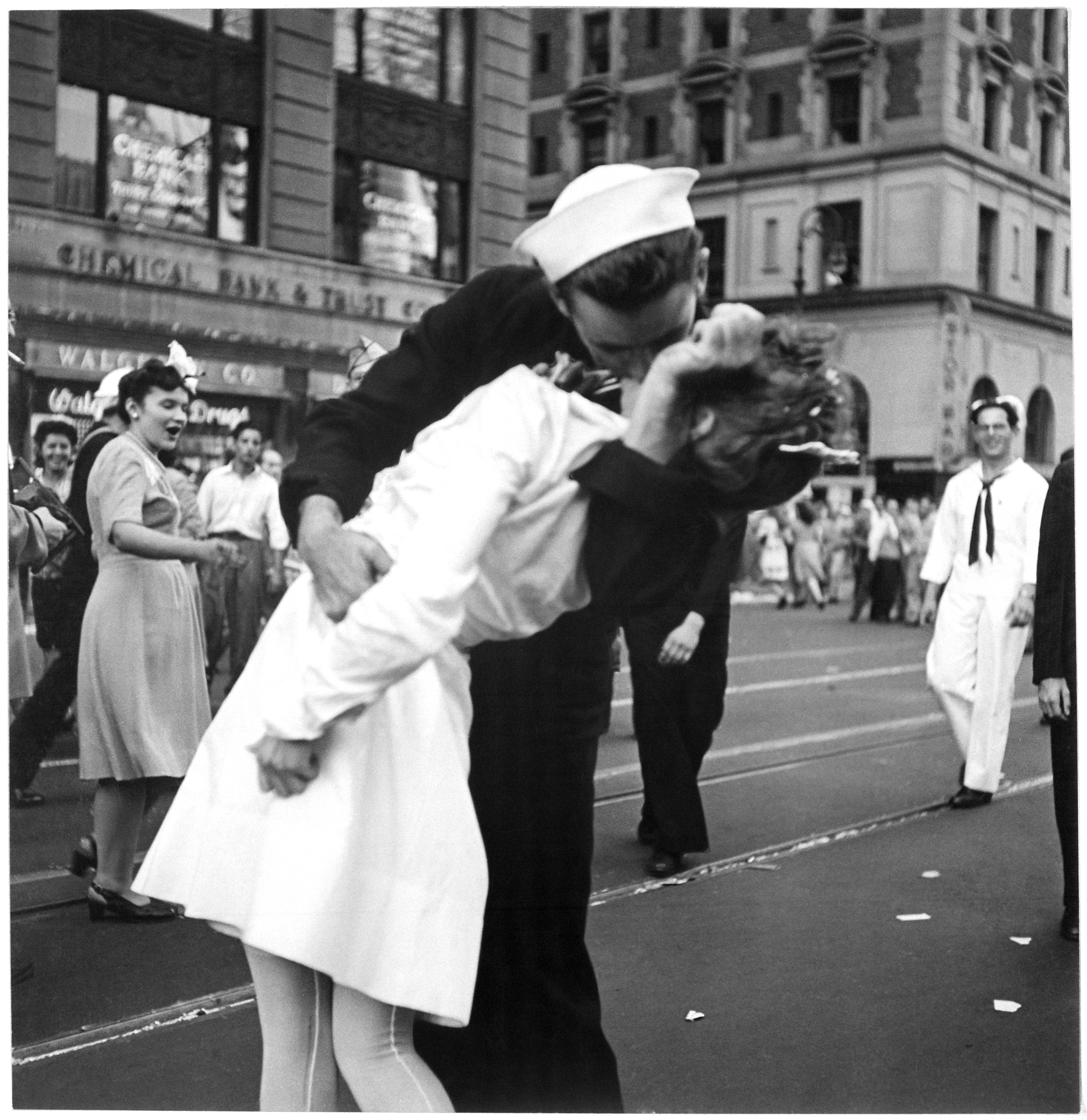
- Greta Zimmer Friedman being kissed by sailor George Mendonsa in Victor Jorgensen’s 1945 photograph
- Born: Grete Zimmer; June 5, 1924; Wiener Neustadt, Austria
- Died: September 8, 2016 (aged 92); Richmond, Virginia, U.S.
- Resting place: Arlington National Cemetery
- Education: Queens Vocational High School; Central High School of Needle Trades; Harlem Evening High School; Fashion Institute of Technology; New School of Social Research's Dramatic Workshop; Hood College
- Occupations: Designer, painter, dental assistant
- Known for: V-J Day in Times Square photograph by Alfred Eisenstaedt
- Spouse: Mischa Friedman (m. 1956; died 1998)
- Children: 2

Greta Friedman (née Grete Zimmer; June 5, 1924 – September 8, 2016) was an Austrian-born American who was photographed being grabbed and kissed by a Navy sailor in the historic V-J Day in Times Square photograph of 1945 by Life magazine photographer Alfred Eisenstaedt. For decades the photograph was misattributed in popular culture as being that of a nurse; however, Friedman was wearing a white uniform because she was a dental assistant.

== Early life and education ==
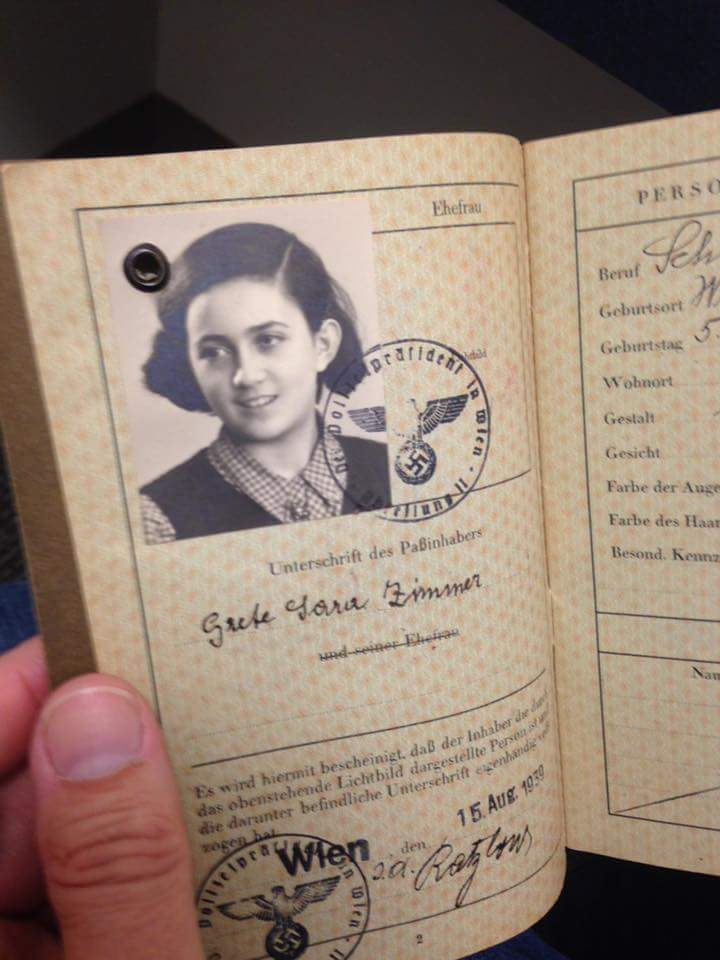
1939 passport issued by the government of Austria for "Grete Sara Zimmer," the middle name added by national socialist decree

She was born Grete Zimmer on June 5, 1924, to a Jewish family in Wiener Neustadt, Austria. In 1939 at age 15, Zimmer emigrated to the United States from Nazi-controlled Austria with two of her sisters, while one sister emigrated to Mandatory Palestine. Unable to leave Europe, their parents, Max and Ida, died in Nazi concentration camps during the Holocaust.

Zimmer attended Queens Vocational High School, the Central High School of Needle Trades, and the Harlem Evening High School. Supporting herself as a dental assistant, she then took classes at the Fashion Institute of Technology (FIT) and studied costuming with the New School of Social Research Dramatic Workshop, led by Erwin Piscator. Later, while living in New York in the 1940s and 1950s, she variously worked in toy design and doll clothing, in early television with the Bil Baird puppets, and in summer theater at the Camp Tamiment Playhouse.

== V-J Day in Times Square ==
On V-J Day, August 14, 1945, Zimmer had left work at the dental office dressed in her uniform and was in Times Square among those gathering in anticipation of an announcement of the end of World War II, when a stranger dressed in a Navy sailor uniform grabbed her and kissed her. Photographer Alfred Eisenstaedt, who was in Times Square to document the event, captured the moment in four frames with his Leica. One of those frames became the photograph, V-J Day in Times Square, that was published in Life magazine in 1945 with the caption, "In New York's Times Square a white-clad girl clutches her purse and skirt as an uninhibited sailor plants his lips squarely on hers".

When Eisenstaedt took the photograph, he failed to get any personal information from his subjects, leaving their identities unknown for decades. In the ensuing years, many women claimed to be the woman in the photograph. Zimmer, now Greta Friedman, eventually saw the photograph in the 1960s and instantly recognized herself. She wrote to Life magazine and provided additional photographs to verify her assertion that she was the woman in the photograph.

Life editors did not contact her until 1980, however, when renewed interest in who the subjects of the photograph were and, after research and analysis confirmed that Friedman was the woman in the photograph, and that George Mendonsa was the sailor. Life editors invited the subjects of the photograph to a 'reunion'.

V-J Day in Times Square became famous and was viewed popularly as a romantic photograph taken during the 1945 victory celebrations. As she adapted to that interpretation of what she acknowledged as not consensual, Friedman expressed mixed feelings about it decades later. In 2005, during an interview at the Library of Congress Friedman stated, "it wasn't my choice to be kissed. The guy just came over and kissed or grabbed." and "I was grabbed by a sailor and it wasn't that much of a kiss, it was more of a jubilant act that he didn't have to go back, I found out later, he was so happy that he did not have to go back to the Pacific where they already had been through the war. And the reason he grabbed someone dressed like a nurse was that he just felt very grateful to nurses who took care of the wounded."

She went on to say, "I felt he was very strong, he was just holding me tight, and I'm not sure I—about the kiss because, you know, it was just somebody really celebrating. But it wasn't a romantic event. It was just an event of thank God the war is over kind of thing."

In 2012, Friedman told CBS News, "I did not see him approaching, and before I know it I was in this tight grip."

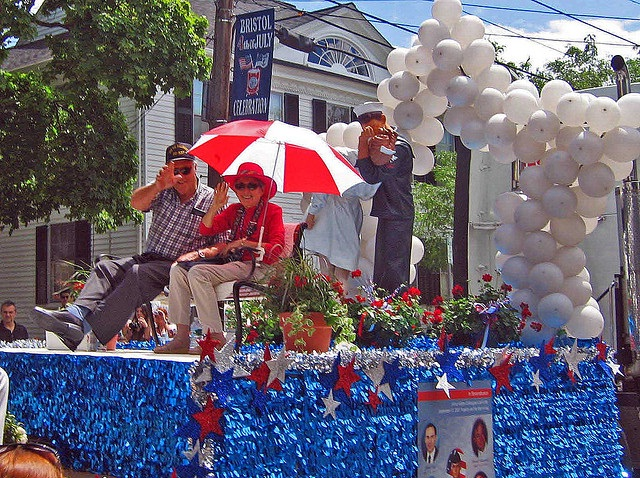
George Mendonsa and Greta Friedman as guests of honor at the Bristol July 4, 2009 parade

== Later years and death ==
In 1956, she married Dr. Mischa Friedman, a WWII veteran of the U.S. Army Air Corps and a scientific researcher for the Army at Fort Detrick, and moved to Frederick, Maryland.

She attended Hood College, studying oil painting, printing, sculpture, and watercolors, but did not graduate until 1981, the same year in which her two children, Mara and Joshua, graduated from college. Friedman also worked at Hood for ten years, restoring books.

Mrs. Friedman also maintained the acquaintance and accompanied George and Rita Mendonsa to civic events and anniversary commemorations of V-J Day, although advancing age limited these appearances. Over time, their individual stories and life histories became more widely documented.

Interview requests and autograph requests were fielded regularly. On-air interviews included Fox and Friends, ABC News's 20/20, CBS Saturday Morning, and "New York War Stories," the WNET-produced companion to the PBS series The War: A Ken Burns Film.

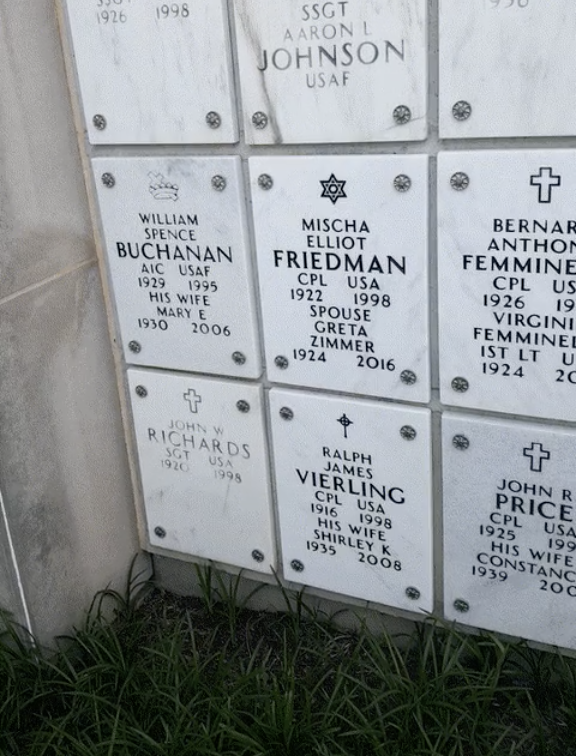
Inurnment at Arlington National Cemetery

Friedman died at age 92 on September 8, 2016, in Richmond, Virginia. Her ashes are inurned beside her husband at Arlington National Cemetery.
