= Grounds For Sculpture =

Sculpture park & museum in Hamilton, New Jersey, USA

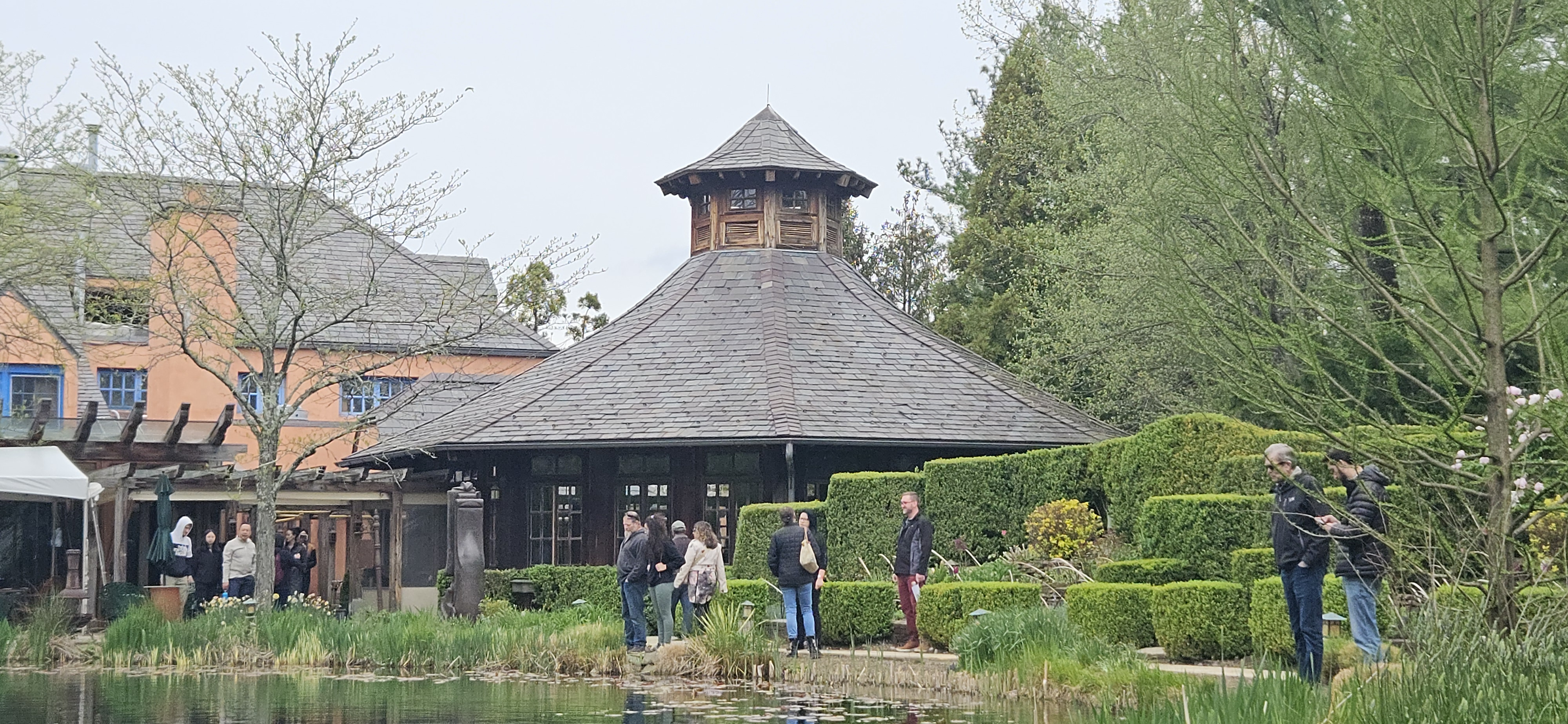
- Established: 1992; 34 years ago
- Location: Hamilton Township, NJ
- Coordinates: 40°14′14″N 74°43′00″W
- Public transit access: NJ Transit Rail: Northeast Corridor Line at Hamilton; NJ Transit Bus: 608
- Website: http://www.groundsforsculpture.org/

Grounds For Sculpture (GFS) is a 42-acre (170,000 m^{2}) sculpture park and museum located in Hamilton Township, New Jersey. It is located on the former site of Trenton Speedway. Founded in 1992 by John Seward Johnson II, the venue is dedicated to promoting an understanding of and appreciation for contemporary sculpture by organizing exhibitions, publishing catalogues, and offering a variety of educational programs and special community events.

In July 2000, GFS became a nonprofit organization open to the public. Operation revenues come from visitors, art patrons, donations, and grants. GFS maintains an ever changing collection of sculptures, with works by Seward Johnson and other artists.

== About ==
In 1984, J. Seward Johnson, sculptor and philanthropist, envisioned a public sculpture garden and museum in Hamilton, NJ. His desire was to make contemporary sculpture accessible and offer people from all backgrounds the opportunity to become comfortable with contemporary art. Grounds For Sculpture was conceived as a place where audiences could experience sculpture in a familiar, accessible, and informal setting. Construction on the sculpture park began in 1989 on the site of the former New Jersey State Fairgrounds; Grounds For Sculpture opened to the general public in 1992.

The park's exhibits include sculptures by distinguished artists Clement Meadmore, Anthony Caro, Beverly Pepper, Kiki Smith, Magdalena Abakanowicz, Boaz Vaadia, and New Jersey sculptor George Segal.

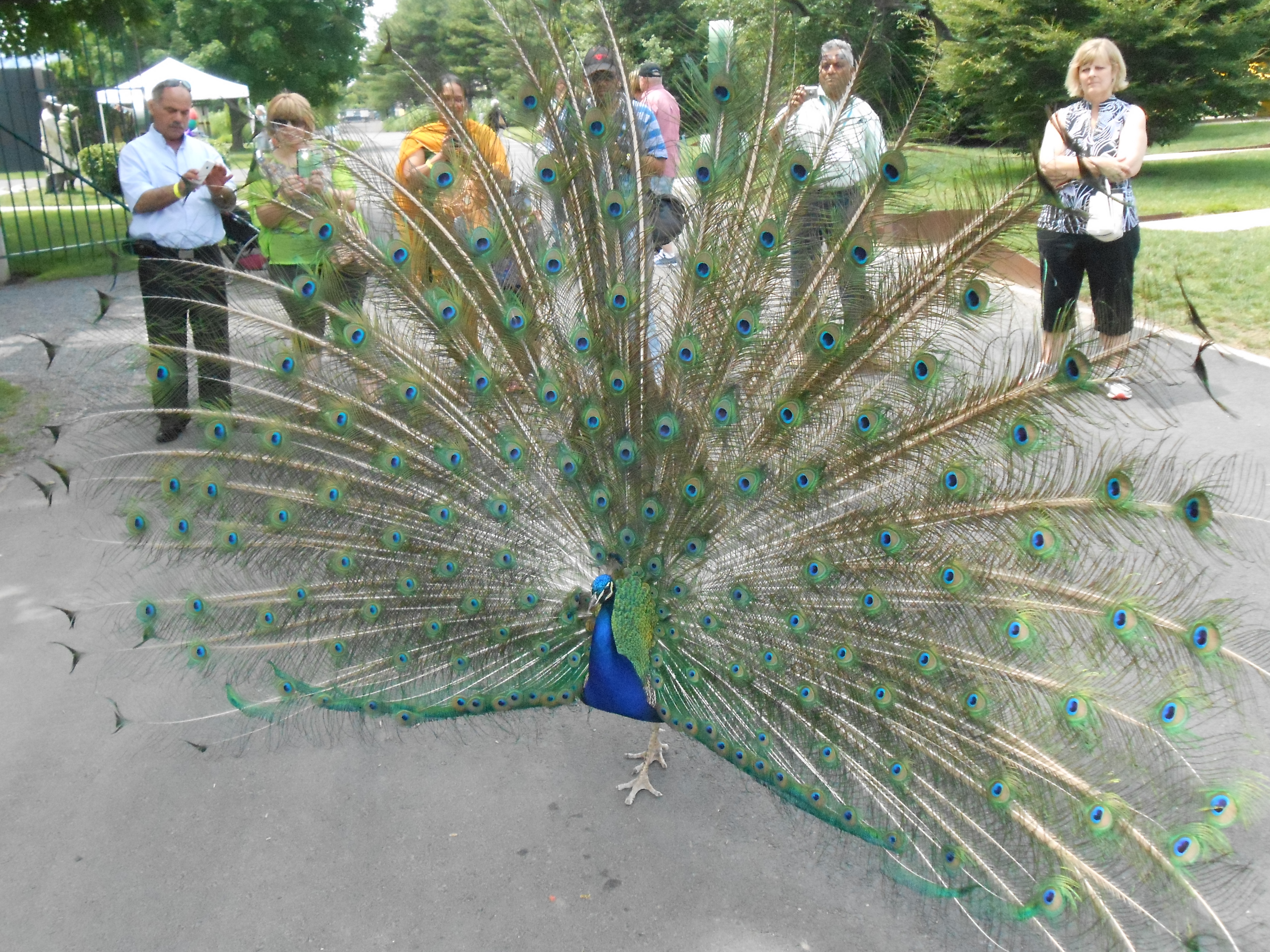
One of the many resident peacocks shows off for guests

Some of the works were commissioned specifically for the GFS, such as Magdalena Abakanowicz’s Space of Stone and New Jersey artist Isaac Witkin’s Garden State. Work on the park and sculpture acquisitions were financed by public tax-exempt bonds and private foundations associated with founder J. Seward Johnson.

GFS maintains a collection of over 270 contemporary sculptures, many of them large-scale, with works by Johnson and other American and international artists. In addition to the sculptures exhibited in landscaped environments, there are also six indoor art galleries. The park's collection of sculptures has continued to change and grow since the park opened, with a list of current exhibits maintained on the park's website.

Since 2000, Grounds For Sculpture has been a public not-for-profit corporation with a Board of Trustees overseeing the successful operation of the sculpture park and museum. As a not-for-profit and public institution, Grounds For Sculpture relies on the support of visitors, art patrons, donations, grants and volunteers to continue to offer its programs and activities each year. GFS also runs programs supporting local charitable causes such as the winter coat drive held in 2016 for Jersey Cares.

In 2013, UntappedCities.com described Grounds for Sculpture as an "Impressionist Oasis in New Jersey", and said it is:

one of the world’s most impressive sculpture gardens. While Grounds for Sculpture possesses a wide array of Modernist sculptures and manicured landscapes, they are far from what make it unique. As you’ll see below, Grounds for Sculpture is home to a bizarre set of sculptural recreations of Impressionist paintings.

During the Pokémon Go craze of 2016, GFS hosted "Catch 'Em All Tours" specifically geared toward Pokémon players. The museum advertised having forty PokéStops and four Pokémon gyms on its property.

In January, 2017 Robert Wood Johnson University Hospital at Hamilton and the Princeton Photography Club teamed up to hold an exhibition celebrating GFS and documenting the evolution of the park in an exhibit called A Grounds For Sculpture History: The Land in Pictures and Words.

The works in the exhibit tell the story of how the former site of the New Jersey State Fairgrounds became Grounds For Sculpture, beginning in 1984 when the Atlantic Foundation purchased 12 acres of the old fairgrounds property adjacent to the Seward Johnson Atelier. From this site emerged founder Seward Johnson’s dream of a park that would become an oasis and respite for all visitors. His goal of creating a place where contemporary sculpture would be accessible to everyone continues today.

== Notable sculptures ==
In July 2013 it was announced that Seward Johnson's Forever Marilyn sculpture would be moved from Palm Springs, California (where it had stood since June 2012) to the Grounds For Sculpture for a 2014 retrospective exhibit honoring Johnson. The statue remained on display at the GFS until September 2015.

Also as part of the retrospective exhibit, Johnson's 25' Unconditional Surrender sculpture, resembling the V-J Day in Times Square photograph taken during the V–J day celebration in Times Square was also on display at the GFS.

== Rat's Restaurant ==
Rat's Restaurant is located on the grounds, and was conceptually designed by Johnson with an Impressionist Claude Monet-styled atmosphere. The scenery surrounding the restaurant features Johnson's own impressionist-inspired sculptures, including a bridge over a lily pond which is an homage to Monet's painting Water Lilies and Japanese Bridge (1897-1899). The restaurant is named after the character "Ratty" from Kenneth Grahame's The Wind in the Willows which is one of Seward Johnson's favorite books.

== Gallery ==
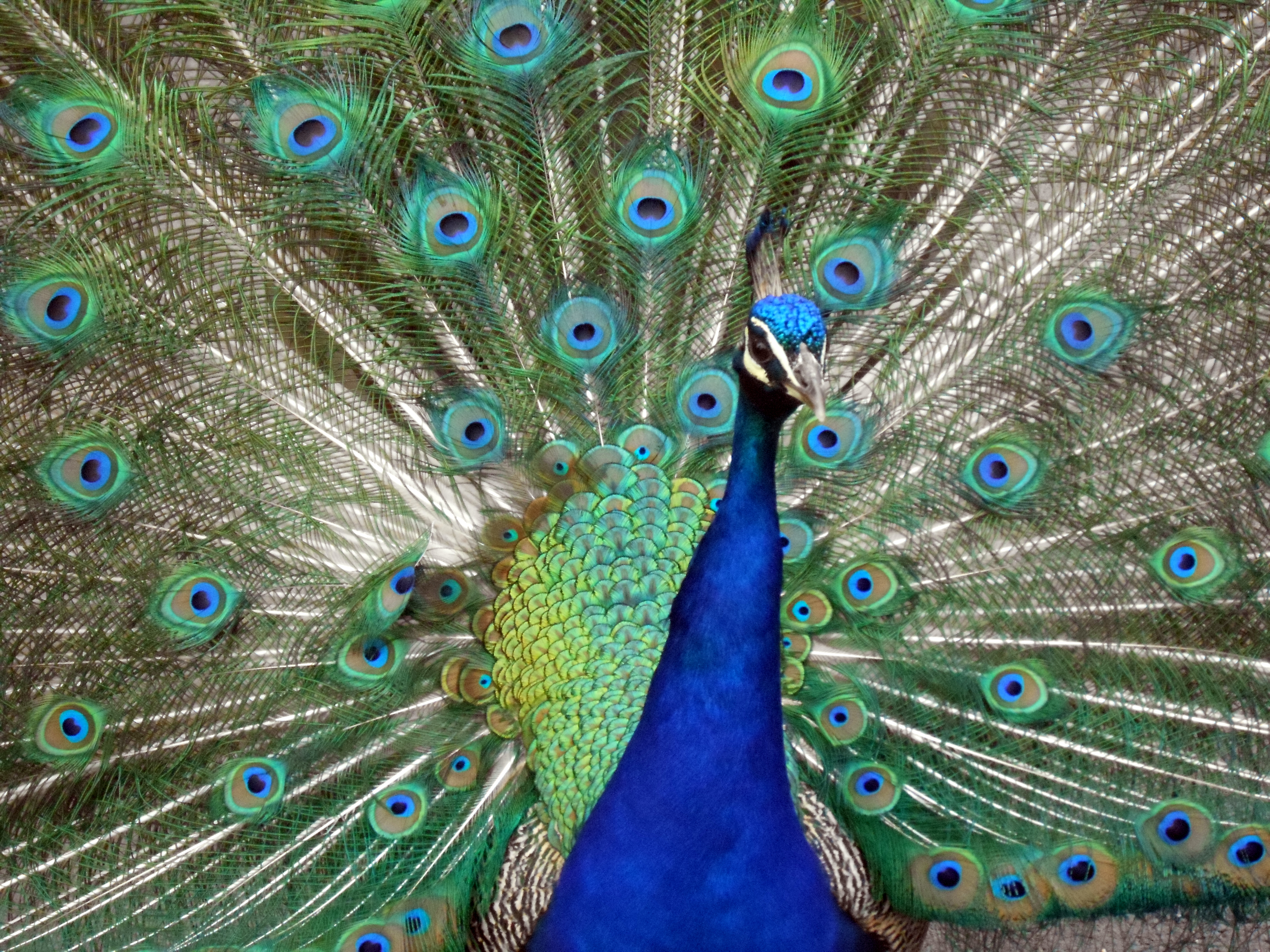

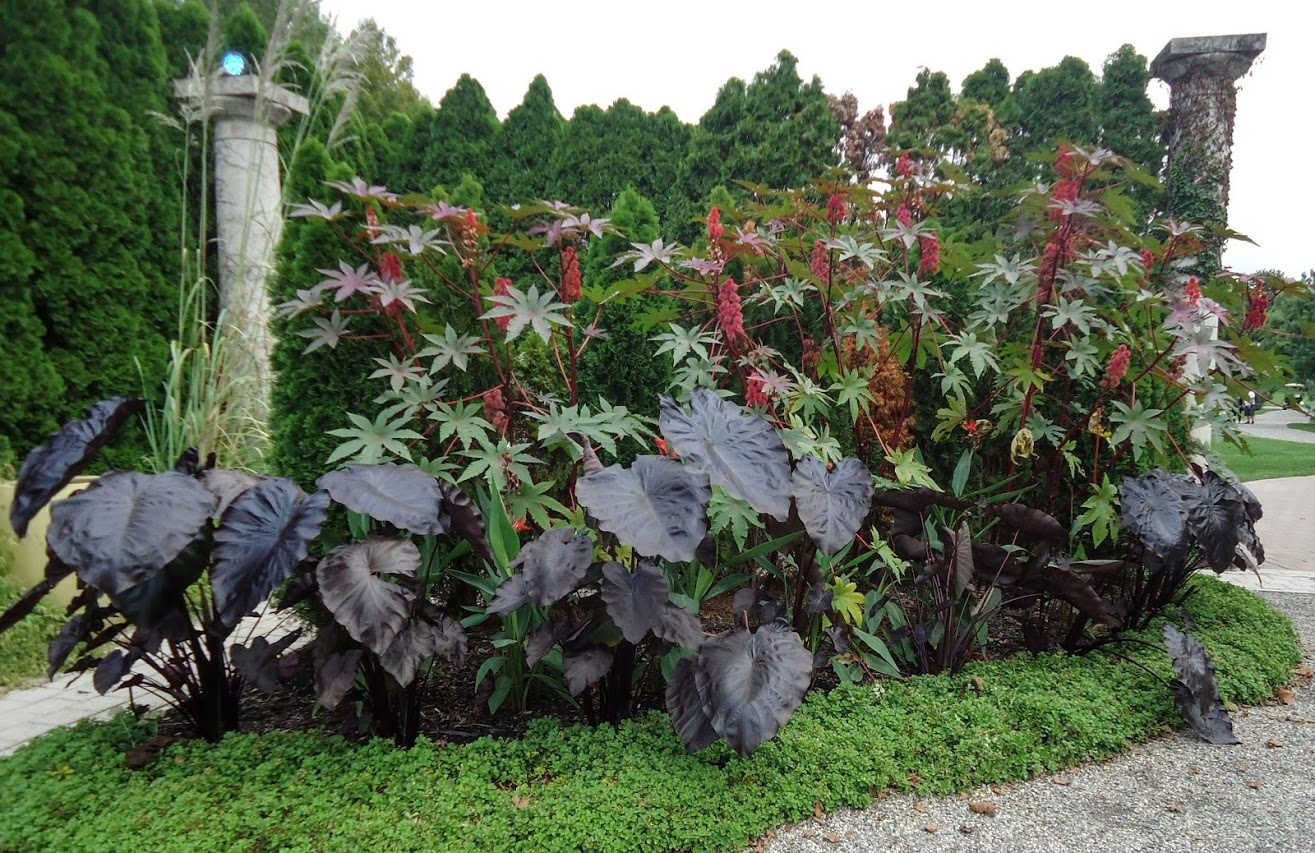
