= V-J Day in Times Square =

1945 photograph by Alfred Eisenstaedt

Coordinates: 40°45′28″N 73°59′08″W

V-J Day in Times Square, a photograph by Alfred Eisenstaedt, was published in Life in 1945 with the caption, "In New York's Times Square a white-clad girl clutches her purse and skirt as an uninhibited sailor plants his lips squarely on hers"

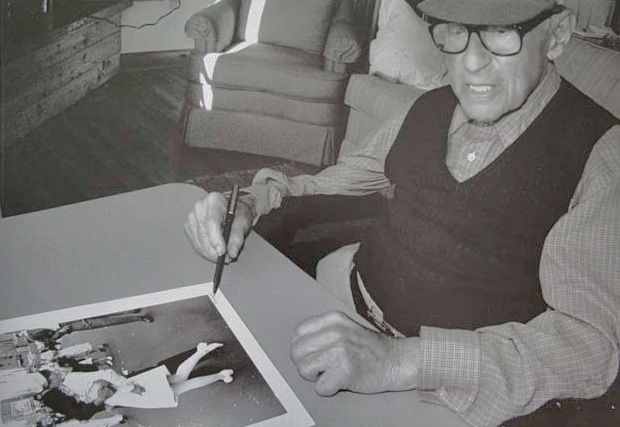
Alfred Eisenstaedt signing a copy of his famous V-J Day in Times Square photograph during the afternoon of August 23, 1995, while sitting in his Menemsha Inn cabin located on Martha's Vineyard. He died approximately eight hours later.

V-J Day in Times Square is a photograph by Alfred Eisenstaedt that portrays a U.S. Navy sailor kissing a total stranger after grabbing her on Victory over Japan Day ("V-J Day") in New York City's Times Square on August 14, 1945. The photograph was published a week later in Life magazine, among many photographs of celebrations around the United States that were presented in a 12-page section entitled "Victory Celebrations". A two-page spread faces a montage of three similar photographs of celebrators in Washington, D.C., Kansas City, and Miami, opposite the Eisenstaedt photograph that was given a full-page display on the right hand side.

Eisenstaedt was photographing a spontaneous event that occurred in Times Square during keen public anticipation of the announcement of the end of the war with Japan (that would be made by U.S. president Harry S. Truman at seven o'clock). Eisenstaedt said that he did not have an opportunity to get the names and details, because he was photographing rapidly changing events during the celebrations. The photograph does not clearly show the face of either person involved, and numerous people have claimed to be the subjects. The photograph was shot just south of 45th Street looking north from a location where Broadway and Seventh Avenue converge. Donald W. Olson and his investigative team estimate that the photograph was taken at 5:51 p.m. ET. In their history pages, Life has noted that the Eisenstaedt photograph was taken with a Leica IIIa camera.

== Accounts by Alfred Eisenstaedt ==
In two books he wrote decades apart, Alfred Eisenstaedt gave two slightly different accounts of taking the photograph and of its nature.

From Eisenstaedt on Eisenstaedt:

In Times Square on V.J. Day I saw a sailor running along the street grabbing any and every girl in sight. Whether she was a grandmother, stout, thin, old, didn't make a difference. I was running ahead of him with my Leica looking back over my shoulder but none of the pictures that were possible pleased me. Then suddenly, in a flash, I saw something white being grabbed. I turned around and clicked the moment the sailor kissed the nurse. If she had been dressed in a dark dress I would never have taken the picture. If the sailor had worn a white uniform, the same. I took exactly four pictures. It was done within a few seconds. Only one is right, on account of the balance. In the others the emphasis is wrong—the sailor on the left side is either too small or too tall. People tell me that when I am in heaven they will remember this picture.

From The Eye of Eisenstaedt:

I was walking through the crowds on V-J Day, looking for pictures. I noticed a sailor coming my way. He was grabbing every female he could find and kissing them all—young girls and old ladies alike. Then I noticed the nurse, standing in that enormous crowd. I focused on her, and just as I'd hoped, the sailor came along, grabbed the nurse, and bent down to kiss her. Now if this girl hadn't been a nurse, if she'd been dressed in dark clothes, I wouldn't have had a picture. The contrast between her white dress and the sailor's dark uniform gives the photograph its extra impact.

His photograph became a cultural icon overnight and, by establishing his copyright, Eisenstaedt carefully controlled the rights to it, only allowing a limited number of reproductions that determined how it could be used.

== Victor Jorgensen photograph ==
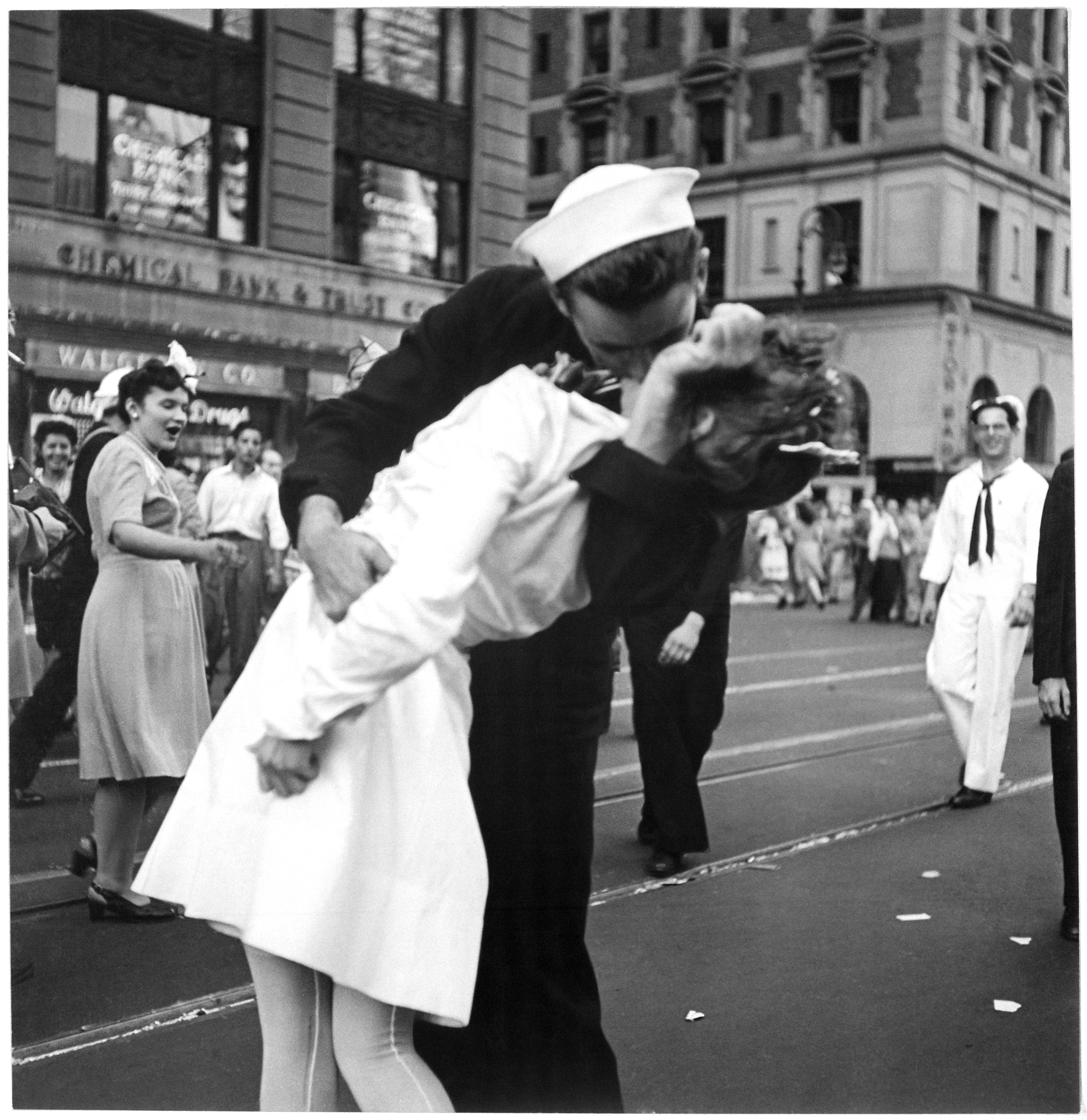
Jorgensen's similar copyright-free photograph

U.S. Navy photojournalist Victor Jorgensen captured another view of the same scene that was published in The New York Times the following day. Jorgensen titled his photograph Kissing the War Goodbye. It shows less of Times Square in the background, lacking the characteristic view of the complex intersection so that the location needs to be identified using other details. The photograph is dark and shows few details of the main subjects, such as not showing their lower legs and feet.

Unlike the Eisenstaedt photograph, which is protected by copyright, this Navy photograph is in the public domain because it was produced by a federal government employee on official duty. While the angle of the Jorgensen photograph may be less interesting artistically than that of the Eisenstaedt photograph, it clearly shows the exact location of the iconic kiss, as occurring in the front of the Chemical Bank and Trust building, with the Walgreens pharmacy sign on the building façade visible in the background.

The astonished woman on the left in Jorgensen's photograph has been positively identified as Kay Hughes Dorius of Utah.

== Identity of the subjects ==
Life initially asked for the subjects of the photograph to reveal themselves, without receiving any replies. Decades later, in 1980, Eisenstaedt received a request for a copy of the photograph from a woman claiming to be the woman in it. This prompted the magazine to publish a request for the man to identify himself. They received several claims from men and unexpectedly, additional claims from women.

=== Claims to be the woman ===
==== Greta Zimmer Friedman ====
Lawrence Verria and George Galdorisi, authors of The Kissing Sailor, a 2012 book about the identity of the subjects of the photograph that had become so famous, used interviews of claimants, expert photograph analysis, identification of people in the background, and consultations with forensic anthropologists and facial recognition specialists. They concluded that the woman was Greta Zimmer Friedman and that she was wearing her dental hygienist uniform in the photograph.

Friedman died at age 92 on September 8, 2016, in Richmond, Virginia, of age-related health complications.

==== Edith Shain ====
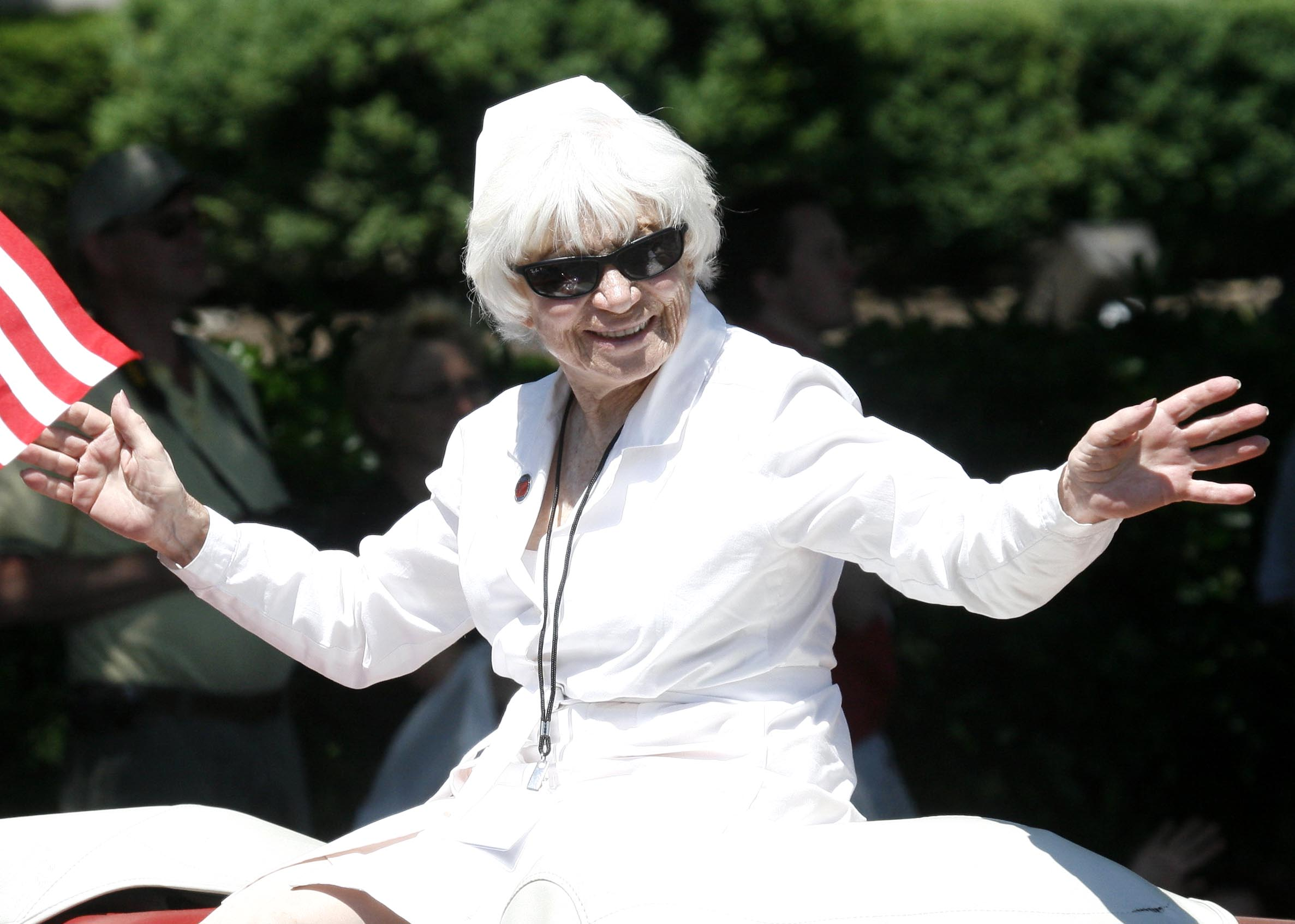
Edith Shain, shown at the 2008 Memorial Day parade in Washington, D.C., has been determined as not likely to be the subject of the photograph

Edith Shain wrote to Eisenstaedt in 1980 claiming to be the woman in the photograph. Shain's letter motivated the magazine to publish a request for the other subject to come forward. A number of replies were received, both from men and women claiming to be one of the subjects. Nonetheless, Shain cultivated the notoriety associated with her claim and accepted invitations to attend events related to the photograph and to meet with men claiming to be the sailor.

On June 20, 2010, Shain died at age 91 of liver cancer.

Verria and Galdorisi's 2012 book about the identity of the subjects of the photograph stated that Shain could not have been the woman because her height of just 4 ft 10 in (1.47 m) was insufficient in comparison with the height of any of the men claiming to be the sailor.

=== Claims to be the man ===
Numerous men have claimed to be the sailor, including Donald Bonsack, John Edmonson, Wallace C. Fowler, Clarence "Bud" Harding, Walker Irving, James Kearney, Marvin Kingsburg, Arthur Leask, George Mendonsa (Mendonça), Jack Russell, and Bill Swicegood.

==== George Mendonsa ====
George Mendonsa (or alternatively Mendonça, in the Portuguese spelling, with the C-cedilla) of Newport, Rhode Island, on leave from USS The Sullivans, was watching a movie with his future wife, Rita Petry, at Radio City Music Hall when the doors opened and people started screaming the war was over. George and Rita joined the celebration in the street, but when they could not get into the packed bars decided to walk down the street. It was then that George saw a woman in a white dress walk by and took her into his arms and kissed her: "I had quite a few drinks that day and I considered her one of the troops—she was a nurse." In one of the four photographs that Eisenstaedt took, Mendonsa claims that Rita is visible in the background behind the kissing couple.

In 1987, George Mendonsa filed a lawsuit against Time Inc. in Rhode Island state court, alleging that he was the sailor in the photograph and that both Time and Life had violated his right of publicity by using the photograph without his permission. Citing legal costs, Mendonsa dropped his lawsuit in 1988.

Mendonsa was identified by a team of volunteers from the Naval War College in August 2005 as "the kisser". His claim was based on matching his scars and tattoos to scars and tattoos in the photograph. They made their determination after much study including photographic analysis by the Mitsubishi Electric Research Laboratories (MERL) in Cambridge, Massachusetts, who were able to match scars and tattoo spotted by photograph experts, and the testimony of Richard M. Benson, a photograph analysis expert, professor of photographic studies, plus the former dean of the School of Arts at Yale University. Benson stated that "it is therefore my opinion, based upon a reasonable degree of certainty, that George Mendonsa is the sailor in Mr. Eisenstaedt's famous photograph."

The identity of the sailor as George Mendonsa has been challenged by physicists Donald W. Olson and Russell Doescher of Texas State University and Steve Kawaler of Iowa State University based on astronomical conditions recorded by the photographs of the incident. According to Mendonsa's account of the events of the day, the kiss would have occurred at approximately 2 p.m. However, Olson and Doescher argue that the positions of shadows in the photographs suggest that it was taken after 5 p.m. They further point to a clock seen in the photograph, its minute hand near the 10 and its hour hand pointing virtually vertically downward, indicating a time of approximately 5:50, and to Victor Jorgensen's account of the circumstances of his own photograph. They concluded that Mendonsa's version of events is untenable. Mendonsa died on February 17, 2019, aged 95, two days shy of his 96th birthday.

==== Friedman identified by Mendonsa ====
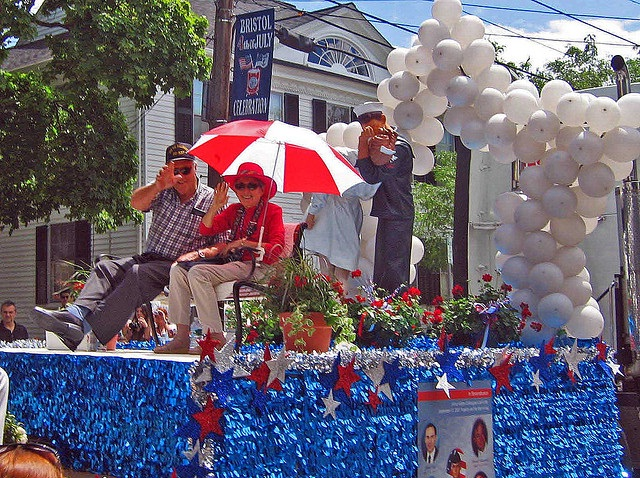
George Mendonsa and Greta Friedman, determined to be the most likely subjects of the photograph, were the guests of honor at the Bristol, Rhode Island, 4th of July parade in 2009

Mendonsa and Friedman (both individually and together), as well as Shain, Muscarello, and McDuffie, were widely interviewed in the succeeding years by Life, PBS, NBC, CBS, and others.

To the exclusion of any other woman claiming to be the subject, Mendonsa identified Friedman as the "nurse" he kissed in the photographs (or, to be precise, the woman in the white uniform, as Friedman was a dental assistant—a white uniform was customary in a dentist's office to be worn by female assistants and hygienists in that era).

===== Mendonsa attended a war memorial ceremony in 2013 =====
As part of a World War II memorial at Battleship Cove in Fall River, Massachusetts, a new painting entitled Victory Kiss by Jim Laurier of New Hampshire was unveiled on August 24, 2013, to honor the event captured in the photograph. George Mendonsa was in attendance for the unveiling.

==== Carl Muscarello ====
Carl Muscarello was a retired police officer with the New York City Police Department, who relocated to living in Plantation, Florida. In 1995, he claimed to be the kissing sailor. He claimed that he was in Times Square on August 14, 1945, and that he kissed numerous women. A distinctive birthmark on his hand enabled his mother to identify him as the subject. Edith Shain initially said she believed Muscarello's claim to be the sailor and they even dated after their brief reunion but in 2005, Shain was much less certain, telling the New York Times, "I can't say he isn't. I just can't say he is. There is no way to tell." Muscarello has described his condition on August 14, 1945, as being quite drunk, and having no clear memory of his actions in the square. He stated that his mother claimed he was the man after seeing the photograph, and he came to believe it. Muscarello died in February 2024, at the age of 96.

==== Glenn McDuffie ====
Glenn McDuffie laid claim in 2007 and was supported by Houston Police Department forensic artist Lois Gibson. Gibson's forensic analysis compared the Eisenstaedt photographs with recent photographs of McDuffie, analyzing key facial features identical on both sets. She measured his ears, facial bones, hairline, wrist, knuckles, and hand, and she compared those to enlargements of Eisenstaedt's photograph.

I could tell just in general that yes, it's him. But I wanted to be able to tell other people so I replicated the pose.

In the August 14, 2007, issue of AM New York McDuffie said he passed five polygraph tests confirming his claim to be the man. McDuffie, a native of Kannapolis, North Carolina, who had lied about his age so he could enlist at the age of 15, went on after the war to play semi-pro baseball and to work for the United States Postal Service. He stated that on that day he was using the subway to go to Brooklyn to visit his girlfriend, Ardith Bloomfield. He came out of the subway at Times Square, where people were celebrating in the streets. Excited that his brother, who was being held by the Japanese as a prisoner of war, would be released, McDuffie began hollering and jumping up and down. A nurse saw him, and opened her arms to him. In apparent conflict with Eisenstaedt's recollections of the event, McDuffie said he ran over to her and kissed her for a long time so that Eisenstaedt could take the photograph:

I went over there and kissed her and saw a man running at us...I thought it was a jealous husband or boyfriend coming to poke me in the eyes. I looked up and saw he was taking the picture and I kissed her as long as it took for him to take it.

Gibson had also analyzed photographs of other men who have claimed to be the sailor, including Muscarello and Mendonsa (Mendonça), reporting that neither man's facial bones or other features match those of the sailor in the photograph. On August 3, 2008, Glenn McDuffie was recognized for his 81st birthday as the "Kissing Sailor" during the seventh-inning stretch of the Houston Astros and New York Mets game at Minute Maid Park. McDuffie died on March 14, 2014, at the age of 86.

==== 1980 claims published by Life ====
Publishing information about those claiming to be the subjects of the Eisenstaedt photograph, an October 1980 issue of Life did not include Muscarello or Glenn McDuffie, because their claims were made much later.

== 21st century reinterpretations of the photograph ==
The original interpretations of the photograph centered on the jubilation of the 1945 V-J Day celebrations. In 1997, art critic Michael Kimmelman summarized the composition of the Eisenstaedt photograph as reflective of that mood: the sailor representing returning troops, the nurse representing those who would welcome them home, and Times Square standing for home.

In the 2010s, bloggers began calling the photograph a documentation of a type of "normalized sexual assault". The people pictured in the photograph did not previously know one another. Drunk at the time of the photograph, the sailor is shown kissing an unwilling partner (according to historic preservationist Kafi Benz, among the four frames taken by Eisenstaedt, the woman is shown defensively punching the man in the face with the closed fist of her one, free arm). The woman who is widely agreed to be a subject in the photograph, dental assistant Greta Zimmer Friedman, had also explicitly stated that the kiss she was subjected to, was not a consensual act, that he just "grabbed" her. Combined with bemused expressions on some of the bystanders and the sailor's firm grasp of the nurse, the situation has been described as emblematic of a time when women were "subordinated to men", or that of a rape culture.

At a June 2020 public meeting in Sarasota, Florida about the placement of a copy of Unconditional Surrender, a sculpture based on the photographs, Kafi Benz of the local organization Friends of Seagate, noting that it was conveying a message about subjugation, referred to the removal of Confederate monuments and memorials related to subjugation (that was ongoing following the murder of George Floyd), identified that as one of several reasons the public art committee of Sarasota should recommend removal of the sculpture from public land in the city.

=== Second interpretive sign proposal ===
At the close of 2021, the question of whether to place a sign addressing the "controversy surrounding the statue" was presented to the city commission at a public meeting in Sarasota on December 6. The proposed sign would be donated by Friends of Seagate and would be designed and drafted through a joint effort by the organization, city staff overseeing public art, and the public arts committee, as well as having to meet the approval of the city commission. The sign would accompany an existing interpretive sign that had been designed and placed by the donor who gave the statue to the city. After taking public comment and extensive discussion among the commissioners, a closely divided vote resulted in dismissal of the proposal.

Shortly thereafter, Kelly Franklin, a city resident who has advocated removal of the statue for some time, created Project Delta Dawn. This website provides a comprehensive history of the original photograph, the copyright controversy, documentation of the subjects, creation of the statue, public sentiments about the statue, and the proposal for an interpretive sign to "address contemporary cultural attitudes regarding the non-consensual nature now known about the event captured in the famous photograph".

== In popular culture ==
Unconditional Surrender sculpture in Times Square, Manhattan, 2015

A central element of the 1987 neo-noir psychological horror film Angel Heart involves a private detective attempting to locate a soldier who disappeared from the Times Square V-J Day celebrations soon after having participated in a kiss similar to the one captured by Eisenstaedt.

In The Simpsons episode "Bart the General" (first airdate February 4, 1990), victory celebrations following a "war" between two groups of children include a boy in a sailor outfit kissing Lisa Simpson as a photograph is taken. Afterwards, she then slaps the boy across his face, telling him to "Knock it off!"

On August 14, 2005, John Seward Johnson II displayed a bronze life-size sculpture of the kiss, Unconditional Surrender, at a 60th-anniversary reenactment at Times Square. His statue was featured in a ceremony that included Carl Muscarello and Edith Shain as participants, holding a copy of the famous photograph.

Johnson also sculpted a 25-foot-tall (7.6 m) version in plastic and aluminum, which had been displayed in several cities, including San Diego and Sarasota. The 25-foot (7.6 m) version was moved to New York City again on August 12, 2015, for a temporary display.

In the film Night at the Museum: Battle of the Smithsonian (2009), Larry Daley and Amelia Earhart (played by Ben Stiller and Amy Adams) jump into a life-size enlargement of the photograph, finding themselves in a monochrome Times Square. One of them cuts in on the sailor for a kiss with the nurse.

During the opening credits of the film Watchmen (2009), the Times Square V-J celebration is shown with a costumed heroine, Silhouette, kissing a female nurse as a photographer captures the moment.

In the film Letters to Juliet (2010), the photograph is featured in a scene where a magazine editor questions a writer about her fact-checking regarding the image.

In 2012, while performing a show for the Marines during the New York City Fleet Week, singer Katy Perry kissed a man on stage, replicating the pose.

In the video game Wolfenstein: The New Order (2014), an alternative history version of the V-J Day kiss (V-A Day in the timeline) appears as a Nazi soldier forcing himself on the nurse, in Paris instead of New York.

In the Life, Larry and the Pursuit of Unhappiness episode "Lawrence" (2026), a character played by Larry David sees the kiss unfold in Times Square, and attempts to kiss a nurse on his own, much to the dismay of the nurse, her partner, and others around the scene.

== See also ==
- Dancing Man, an image of V-J Day in Sydney
- List of photographs considered the most important
