= Marty P. Johnson =

Martin "Marty" P. Johnson is president and founder of Isles, Inc., a Trenton, New Jersey–based community development organization.

He is a founder and former director of New Jersey Community Capital, founding trustee of the Housing and Community Development Network of New Jersey, founder and former chair of the New Jersey Regional Coalition, and former member of the Mercer Trenton African American Chamber of Commerce (MTAACC) and other organizations. He is the founder and former co-chair of the national Success Measures Project, a project of the Development Leadership Network. In 1996, he taught as a visiting fellow at the Princeton University Woodrow Wilson School of Public and International Affairs, and he was the James Wei Visiting Professor in Entrepreneurship at Princeton University's Engineering School for the 2015–2017 academic years. His course, EGR498, was titled, Rethinking Social Profit Organizations. In 2018, he began teaching FR 158, So, You Want To Change the World. In January 2020, he became the Entrepreneur In Residence at Lafayette College, where he taught Social Entrepreneurship, Advised student teams and Co-Developed a New Entrepreneur Fellowship. He is a former trustee and member of the Executive Committee of Princeton University. He is a former director of Capital Health Systems and an Advisory Committee member of Princeton University's Architecture and Art Museum Departments.

== Awards ==
- Take Pride in America award (1989)
- Princeton Peace Prize
- New Jersey Pride Award for Community Development from the New Jersey Monthly magazine (1998)
- Humanitarian of the Year Award from the New Jersey Chapter of the National Conference on Community and Justice

== Isles, Inc. ==
Isles is a non-profit community development organization. It was founded in 1981 to serve residents of central New Jersey.
