= Martin Johnson (footballer) =

English footballer

Personal information
- Full name: Martin John James Johnson
- Date of birth: 21 March 1906
- Place of birth: Windy Nook, England
- Date of death: 1977 (aged 70–71)
- Position: Inside forward

Senior career*
Years	Team	Apps	(Gls)
1924–1925	Felling Colliery		
1925	Sunderland	0	(0)
1925–1926	Durham City	11	(2)
1926–1927	Bradford (Park Avenue)	37	(6)
1927–1928	Sheffield United	6	(0)
1928	Durham City		
1928–1929	Wolverhampton Wanderers	8	(2)
1930	Spennymoor United		
1930–1933	Murton Colliery Welfare		
1933	North Shields		
1933	Wardley Colliery Welfare		
1934	Pelaw		
1935	Blyth Spartans		
Total		62	(10)
- * Club domestic league appearances and goals

Martin John James Johnson (21 March 1906 – 1977) was an English footballer who played in the Football League for Bradford (Park Avenue), Durham City, Sheffield United and Wolverhampton Wanderers.
