= Alfred Eisenstaedt =

German-born American photojournalist (1898–1995)

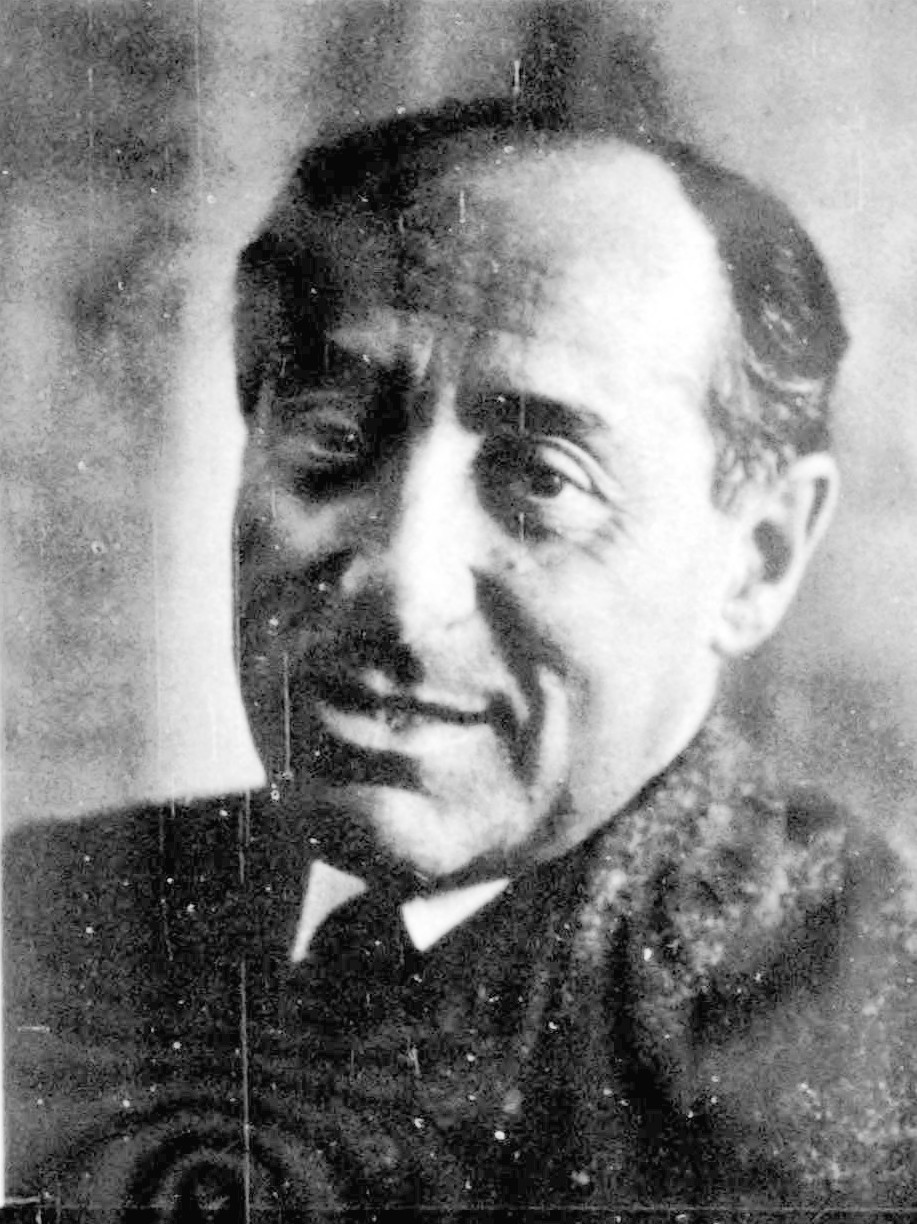
- Eisenstaedt c. 1958
- Born: December 6, 1898; Dirschau, West Prussia, German Empire (now Tczew, Poland)
- Died: August 23, 1995 (aged 96); Oak Bluffs, Massachusetts, U.S.
- Occupation: Photojournalism
- Spouse: Kathy Kaye (m. 1949; died 1972)
- Military career
- Allegiance: German Empire
- Branch: Imperial German Army
- Service years: 1914—1918
- Conflicts: First World War (WIA)

Alfred Eisenstaedt (December 6, 1898 – August 23, 1995) was a German-born American photographer and photojournalist. He began his career in Germany prior to World War II but achieved prominence as a staff photographer for Life magazine after moving to the U.S. Life featured more than 90 of his pictures on its covers, and more than 2,500 of his photo stories were published.

Among his most famous cover photographs was V-J Day in Times Square, taken during the V-J Day celebration in New York City, showing an American sailor kissing a nurse in a "dancelike dip" which "summed up the euphoria many Americans felt as the war came to a close", in the words of his obituary. He was "renowned for his ability to capture memorable images of important people in the news" and for his candid photographs taken with a small 35mm Leica camera, typically with natural lighting.

== Early life ==
Eisenstaedt was born in Dirschau (Tczew) in West Prussia, Imperial Germany in 1898. His family was Jewish and moved to Berlin in 1906. Eisenstaedt was fascinated by photography from his youth and began taking pictures at age 11 when he was given his first camera, an Eastman Kodak Folding Camera with roll film. He served in the German Army's artillery during World War I and was wounded in 1918. While working as a belt and button salesman in the 1920s in Weimar Germany, Eisenstaedt began taking photographs in 1928 as a freelancer for the Pacific and Atlantic Photos' Berlin office, which was taken over by the Associated Press in 1931.

== Professional photographer ==
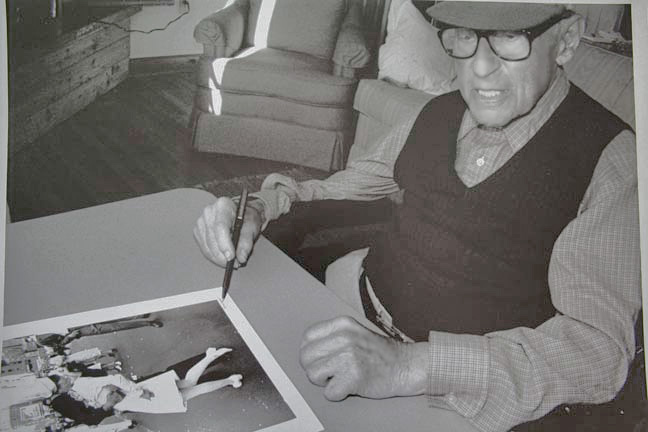
Eisenstaedt signing a "V-J Day in Times Square" print on August 23, 1995, at his Menemsha cabin on Martha's Vineyard. He died a few hours later.

Eisenstaedt became a full-time photographer in 1929 when he was hired by the Associated Press office in Germany, and within a year he was described as a "photographer extraordinaire." He also worked for Illustrierte Zeitung, published by Ullstein Verlag, then the world's largest publishing house. Four years later he photographed the famous first meeting between Adolf Hitler and Benito Mussolini in Italy. Other notable early pictures by Eisenstaedt include his depiction of a waiter at the ice rink of the Grand Hotel in St. Moritz in 1932 and Joseph Goebbels at the League of Nations in Geneva in 1933.

In 1935, Fascist Italy's impending invasion of Ethiopia led to a burst of international interest in Ethiopia. While working for Berliner Illustrierte Zeitung, Alfred took over 3,500 photographs in Ethiopia, before emigrating to the United States, where he joined Life magazine, but returned in the following year to Ethiopia to continue his photography.

Eisenstaedt's family was Jewish. Oppression in Hitler's Nazi Germany caused them to emigrate to the U.S. They arrived in 1935 and settled in New York, where he subsequently became a naturalized citizen, and joined fellow Associated Press émigrés Leon Daniel and Celia Kutschuk in their PIX Publishing photo agency founded that year. The following year, 1936, Time founder Henry Luce bought Life magazine, and Eisenstaedt, already noted for his photography in Europe, was asked to join the new magazine as one of its original staff of four photographers, including Margaret Bourke-White and Robert Capa. He remained a staff photographer from 1936 to 1972, achieving notability for his photojournalism of news events and celebrities.

Along with entertainers and celebrities, he photographed politicians, philosophers, artists, industrialists, and authors during his career with Life. By 1972, he had photographed nearly 2,500 stories and had more than 90 of his photos on the cover. With Life's circulation of two million readers, Eisenstaedt's reputation increased substantially. According to one historian, "his photographs have a power and a symbolic resonance that made him one of the best Life photographers." In subsequent years, he also worked for Harper's Bazaar, Vogue, Town & Country and others.

=== Style and technique ===
From his early years as professional photographer he became an enthusiast for small 35 mm film cameras, especially the Leica camera. Unlike most news photographers at the time who relied on much larger and less portable 4"×5" press cameras with flash attachments, Eisenstaedt preferred the smaller hand-held Leica, which gave him greater speed and more flexibility when shooting news events or capturing candids of people in action. His photos were also notable as a result of his typical use of natural light as opposed to relying on flash lighting. In 1944, Life described him as the "dean of today's miniature-camera experts."

At the time, this style of photojournalism, with a smaller camera with its ability to use available light, was then in its infancy. It also helped Eisenstaedt create a more relaxed atmosphere when photographing famous people where he was able to capture more natural poses and expressions: "They don't take me too seriously with my little camera," he stated. "I don't come as a photographer. I come as a friend." It was a style he learned from his 35 years in Europe, where he preferred making informal, unposed portraits, along with extended picture stories. As a result, Life began using more such photo stories, with the magazine becoming a recognized source of such photojournalism of the world's luminaries. Of Life's photographers, Eisenstaedt was most noted for his "human interest" photos and less the hard news images used by most news publications.

His success at establishing a relaxed setting for his subjects was not without difficulties, however, when he needed to capture the feeling he wanted. Anthony Eden, resistant to being photographed, called Eisenstaedt "the gentle executioner." Similarly, Winston Churchill told him where to place the camera to get a good picture, and during a photo shoot of Ernest Hemingway in his boat, Hemingway, in a rage, tore his own shirt to shreds and threatened to throw Eisenstaedt overboard.

=== Martha's Vineyard ===
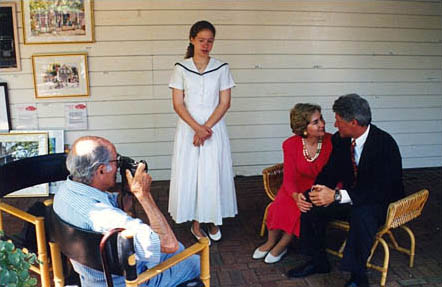
Eisenstaedt photographing the Clinton family on Martha's Vineyard

Eisenstaedt, known as "Eisie" to his close friends, enjoyed his annual August vacations on the island of Martha's Vineyard for 50 years. During these summers, he would conduct photographic experiments, working with different lenses, filters, and prisms in natural light. Eisenstaedt was fond of Martha's Vineyard's photogenic lighthouses and was the focus of lighthouse fundraisers organized by Vineyard Environmental Research Institute (VERI).

Two years before his death, Eisenstaedt photographed President Bill Clinton with wife Hillary and daughter Chelsea. The session took place at the Granary Gallery in West Tisbury on Martha's Vineyard and was documented by a photograph published in People magazine on September 13, 1993.

== Personal life ==
After first settling in New York City in 1935, Eisenstaedt lived in Jackson Heights, Queens (NYC) for the rest of his life. He met Kathy Kaye, a South African woman, and married her in 1949. The couple had no children and remained together until her death in 1972. Until shortly before Eisenstaedt's death, he would walk daily from his home to his Life office on the Avenue of the Americas and 51st Street.

He died in August 1995 at age 96 at his Martha's Vineyard vacation cottage named "Pilot House", in the company of his sister-in-law, Lucille Kaye, and a photographer friend, William E. Marks.

He was buried at Mount Hebron Cemetery in Flushing, Queens.

== Notable Eisenstaedt photographs ==
- V-J Day in Times Square

Eisenstaedt's most famous photograph is of an American sailor grabbing and kissing a stranger—a young woman—on August 14, 1945, in Times Square. He took this photograph using a Leica IIIa. (The photograph is known under various names: V-J Day in Times Square, V-Day, and others.) Because Eisenstaedt was photographing rapidly changing events during the V-J Day celebrations, he stated that he did not get a chance to obtain names and details, which has encouraged a number of mutually incompatible claims to the identities of the subjects.

- Portraits of Sophia Loren

The portraits of Sophia Loren have been described by Marianne Fulton of The Digital Journalist as conveying mischievousness, dignity, and love on the part of both Eisenstaedt and Loren.

- Ice Skating Waiter, St. Moritz

This 1932 photograph depicts a waiter at the ice rink of the Grand Hotel. "I did one smashing picture", Eisenstaedt wrote, "of the skating headwaiter. To be sure the picture was sharp, I put a chair on the ice and asked the waiter to skate by it. I had a Miroflex camera and focused on the chair."

- Children at a Puppet Theatre, Paris

Eisenstaedt took this photo in 1963 at the Tuileries Garden. He later recalled in his self-portrait, "It took a long time to get the angle I liked. There are some close-ups of the children that are good. But the best picture is the one I took at the climax of the action. It carries all the excitement of the children screaming, 'The dragon is slain!'" The photo sold in Lot #91 at Sotheby's in 2006 for an artist-record price of $55,200.

== Awards and recognition ==
- 1989: National Medal of Arts. Awarded by President George H. W. Bush in a ceremony on the White House lawn.
- 1999: The Digital Journalist chose Alfred Eisenstaedt as its 'Photojournalist of the Century'. Dirck Halstead wrote, "When it came to choosing the one photojournalist who had the most profound impact, and who leaves the greatest legacy, there was no question whom that person is – Alfred Eisenstaedt."
- 2020: Eisenstaedt was posthumously inducted into the International Photography Hall of Fame and Museum.

== Exhibitions ==
- Alfred Eisenstaedt: "Eisie" at 88, International Center of Photography, New York City, 1986. A retrospective.
- Alfred Eisenstaedt: Life and Legacy, the San Diego Museum of Art, San Diego, 2019.

== Alfred Eisenstaedt Awards for Magazine Photography ==
Since 1998, the Alfred Eisenstaedt Awards for Magazine Photography have been administered by Columbia University Graduate School of Journalism.

== See also ==
- Erich Salomon (influence)
- List of German photojournalists
- Notable contributors to Life
